= Heaven in Christianity =

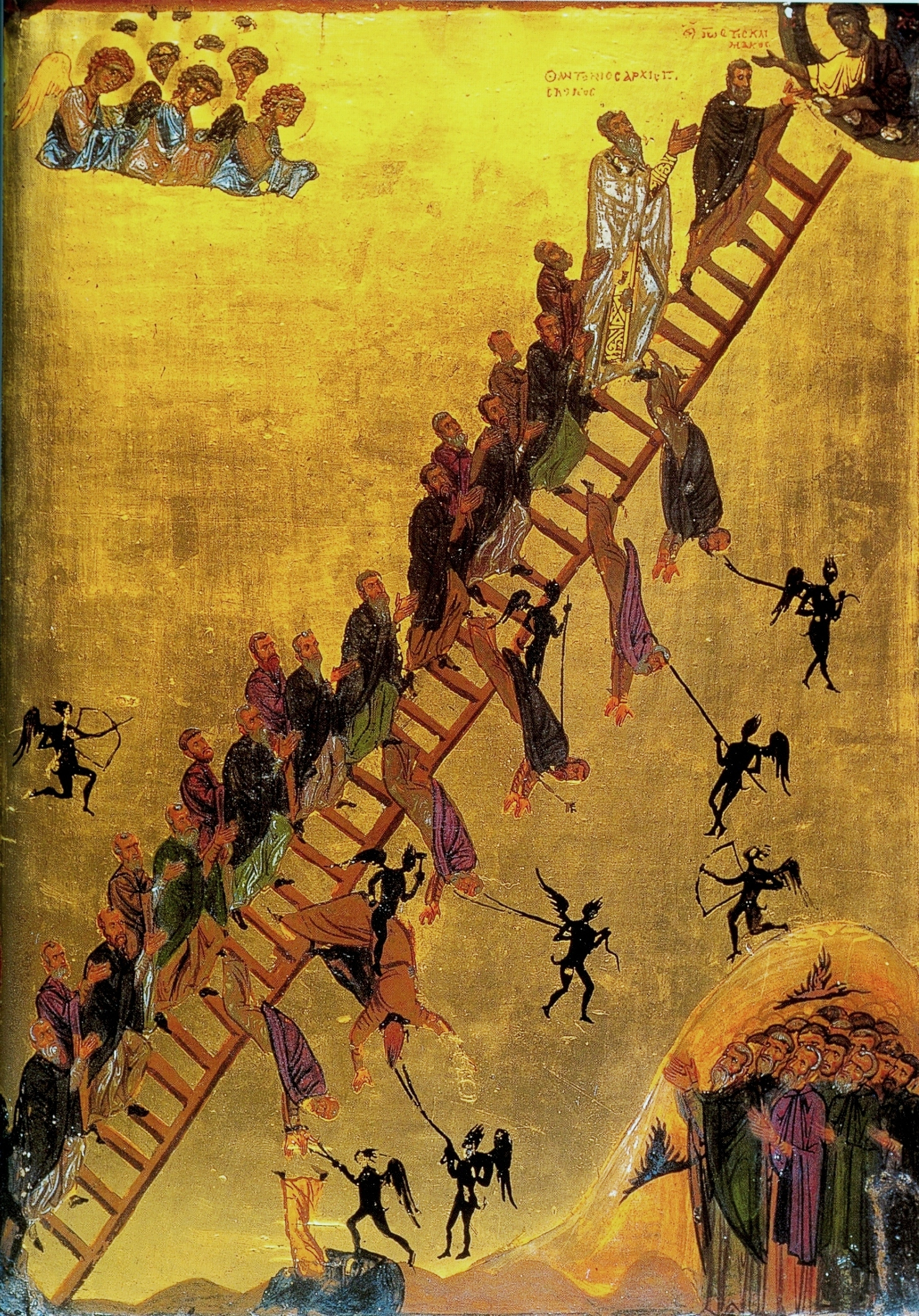
The Ladder of Divine Ascent in Saint Catherine's Monastery, Mount Sinai

In Christianity, heaven is traditionally the location of the throne of God and the angels of God, and in most forms of Christianity it is the abode of the righteous dead in the afterlife. In some Christian denominations it is understood as a temporary stage before the resurrection of the dead and the saints' return to the New Earth.

In the Book of Acts, the resurrected Jesus ascends to heaven where, as the Nicene Creed states, he now sits at the right hand of God and will return to earth in the Second Coming. According to Catholic, Eastern Orthodox, and Oriental Orthodox teaching, Mary, mother of Jesus, is said to have been assumed into heaven without the corruption of her earthly body; she is venerated as Queen of Heaven.

In the Christian Bible, concepts about Christian eschatology, the future "kingdom of heaven", and the resurrection of the dead are found, particularly in the book of Revelation and in 1 Corinthians 15.

== Description ==
The Bible does not provide much information on what Heaven is supposed to be like. As a result, Christian theologians are usually not very specific when describing heaven.

The Book of Revelation states that the New Jerusalem will be transported from Heaven to Earth, rather than people from Earth going to Heaven. The idea of the Pearly gates, which is the informal name for the gateway to heaven according to some Christian denominations, comes from a description of the gates of New Jerusalem in Revelation 21:21 : "The twelve gates were twelve pearls, each gate made of a single pearl. The great street of the city was of gold, as pure as transparent glass."

== Philosophy ==
One argument about the nature of heaven is whether it is possible for someone in heaven to have free will, which would normally include the freedom to sin. The nature of the issue varies depending on the specific type of freedom being discussed. One claimed solution is Augustine's view that people in heaven will no longer be tempted to disobey God.

Another issue is how happiness could be possible with the knowledge that some loved ones are suffering eternally in hell. This argument was published as early as the 1800s by the theologian Friedrich Schleiermacher, who said that the knowledge of anyone's suffering is incompatible with salvation. This can be framed as an argument against the doctrine of eternal hell, but also against the concept of heaven. Traditionally, theologians said that knowing the suffering of the damned would actually glorify God and therefore increase the joy in heaven. More modern responses to this argument include that bliss in Heaven would overwhelm this knowledge, that people would be at peace with the idea of eternal suffering, or that they would have no knowledge of Hell.

Philosophers such as Friedrich Nietzsche have criticized the notion of heaven as a doctrine which was developed by people with suspicious motivations, who desired to prove that God favored their group at the expense of others, or who tried to enforce their conception of religion or morality using methods that often involved manipulation and intimidation.

== Theology ==
=== Early Christianity ===
Scholars say that 1st-century early Jewish-Christians, from whom Christianity developed as a Gentile religion, believed that the kingdom of God was coming to Earth within their own lifetimes, and looked forward to a divine future on Earth. The earliest Christian writings on the topic are those by Paul, such as 1 Thessalonians 4–5, in which the dead are described as having fallen asleep. Paul says that the second coming will arrive without warning, like a "thief in the night," and that the sleeping faithful will be raised first, and then the living. Similarly, in the earliest of the Apostolic Fathers, Pope Clement I, expresses belief in the resurrection of the dead after a period of "slumber" at the Second Coming.

In the 2nd century AD, Irenaeus, a Greek bishop, quoted presbyters as saying that not all who are saved would merit an abode in heaven itself: "[T]hose who are deemed worthy of an abode in heaven shall go there, others shall enjoy the delights of paradise, and others shall possess the splendour of the city; for everywhere the Saviour shall be seen according as they who see Him shall be worthy."

=== Orthodox Christianity ===
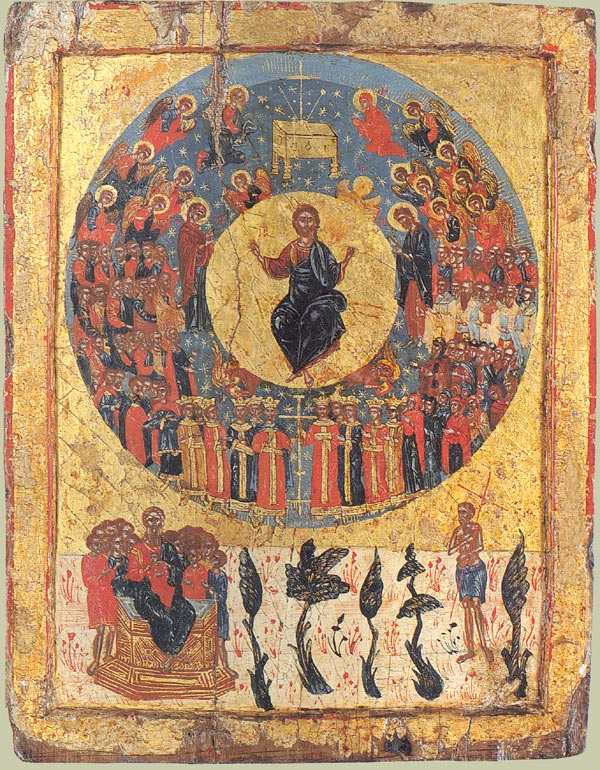
Eastern Orthodox icon depicting Christ enthroned in heaven, surrounded by the ranks of angels and saints. At the bottom is paradise with the Bosom of Abraham (left), and the penitent thief (right).

==== Eastern Orthodox cosmology ====
Various saints have had visions of heaven (2 Corinthians 12:2–4). The Orthodox concept of life in heaven is described in one of the prayers for the dead: "…a place of light, a place of green pasture, a place of repose, from whence all sickness, sorrow and sighing are fled away". In the Eastern Orthodox and Oriental Orthodox Churches, only God has the final say on who enters heaven.

In the Eastern Orthodox Church, heaven is the parcel of deification (theosis), meaning to acquire the divine nature by grace and complete one's hypostasis via Christlike behavior, due to Jesus having made human entry into heaven possible by his incarnation, hence evidence of one's deification is usually miracles akin to those of Christ.

Vladimir Solovyov (1853–1900), a philosopher with a Russian Orthodox background, wrote of "the Creator's theandric aim, that earth may be oned with Heaven".

=== Catholicism ===
==== Official teaching ====
In Catholic teaching, heaven is the state of perfect communion with God, centered on the beatific vision. Because God transcends created understanding, heaven cannot be fully comprehended or described by human language, except insofar as God has revealed it through Scripture, Sacred Tradition, and the teaching authority of the Church.

===== Inhabitants =====
According to the Catechism of the Catholic Church, angels and saints inhabit heaven and enjoy the beatific vision. The angels and saints are Catholic - members of the Catholic Church - as members of the Church Triumphant, one of the three states of the church of heaven and Earth.

The Church specifies known angels, including: one's guardian angel, seraphim, cherubim, Michael the Archangel, Gabriel the Archangel, and Raphael the Archangel. According to Summa Theologiae, it is not known if angels are the only non-human creatures in heaven or just one of many types of creatures in heaven.

Known saints include canonized Catholics, such as those listed in the Litany of the Saints: the Patriarchs and Prophets of the Old Testament, King David, the Virgin Mary and Saint Joseph, John the Baptist, the Holy Innocents, the Penitent Thief, the Apostles (sans Judas Iscariot), Saint Paul, and the Doctors of the Church. Jesus as perfect man is not considered a saint, as he is not a human person but a Divine Person.

===== Going to heaven =====
In Catholic teaching, entry into heaven requires the grace of baptism, which can be obtained outside the sacrament of baptism, such as through baptism of blood or baptism by desire, for God is not bound by his sacraments. The Church commends the unbaptized dead to the Divine Mercy, since the Penitent Thief was saved without baptism.

Those Christians who die still imperfectly purified must, according to Catholic teaching, pass through a state of purification known as purgatory before entering heaven.

===== Description =====
The church teaches that heaven "is the ultimate end and fulfillment of the deepest human longings, the state of supreme, definitive happiness" and "is the perfection of salvation." This is because in heaven one enjoys the beatific vision, the source and summit of heavenly happiness, peace, glory, honor, and all good things. The church holds that,

by his death and Resurrection, Jesus Christ has 'opened' heaven to us. The life of the blessed consists in the full and perfect possession of the fruits of the redemption accomplished by Christ... Heaven is the blessed community of all who are perfectly incorporated into Christ.

The "fruits of the redemption" is eternal life, i.e., freedom from and immunity to all evil (temptation, sin, error, inconvenience, boredom, ignorance, weakness, lack of something (basic needs, beauty, etc.), corruption, misfortune, unfulfillment, sorrow, condemnation, fear, dishonor, hostility, imperfection, suffering, and death), and possession of all good things, via the beatific vision. The Virgin Mary is "the most excellent fruit of the redemption" because of her Immaculate Conception, since she was redeemed at the moment of conception. Mary is also "the eschatological image of the church", meaning she represents the church in heaven and at the resurrection on Judgement Day, because of her assumption into heaven, whereby she enjoys heaven with her resurrected body.

====== Symbolic description in the Bible ======
In the Bible heaven is described symbolically, using images from everyday Jewish life during biblical times. The Catechism of the Catholic Church indicates several images of heaven found in the Bible:

This mystery of blessed communion with God and all who are in Christ is beyond all understanding and description. Scripture speaks of it in images: life, light, peace, wedding feast, wine of the kingdom, the Father's house, the New Jerusalem, paradise: 'no eye has seen, nor ear heard, nor the heart of man conceived, what God has prepared for those who love him'.

The Catechism of the Catholic Church describes heaven as "God's own 'place' — 'our Father in heaven' and consequently the 'heaven' too which is eschatological glory. Finally, 'heaven' refers to the saints and the "place" of the spiritual creatures, the angels, who surround God."

====== Properties of eternal life ======
The Roman Catechism and the Catechism of the Catholic Church both explain that, by enjoying the beatific vision, everyone enjoys happiness, glory, honor, and peace. As the CCC teaches:

There will true glory be, where no one will be praised by mistake or flattery; true honor will not be refused to the worthy, nor granted to the unworthy; likewise, no one unworthy will pretend to be worthy, where only those who are worthy will be admitted. There true peace will reign, where no one will experience opposition either from self or others.

As the Roman Catechism teaches:

For the blessed always see God present and by this greatest and most exalted of gifts, being made partakers of the divine nature, they enjoy true and solid happiness...For the blessed shall enjoy glory; not only that glory which we have already shown to constitute essential happiness, or to be its inseparable accompaniment, but also that glory which consists in the clear and distinct knowledge which each (of the blessed) shall have of the singular and exalted dignity of his companions (in glory). And how distinguished must not that honour be which is conferred by God Himself, who no longer calls them servants, but friends, brethren and sons of God!

The Roman Catechism adds that human concepts of heaven (living like a king, heaven being the most perfect paradise, one enjoying the ultimate union with God, the realization of one's potential and ideals, the achievement of godhood, materialistic fulfillment (wealth, power, feast, pleasure, leisure, etc.), eternal rest, reunion with loved ones, etc.) are nothing compared to what heaven is really like:

the happiness of the Saints is full to overflowing of all those pleasures which can be enjoyed or even desired in this life, whether they regard the powers of the mind or of the perfection of the body; albeit this must be in a manner more exalted than eye hath seen, ear heard, or heart conceived. Who will desire rich apparel or royal robes, where there shall be no further use for such things, and where all shall be clothed with immortality and splendour, and adorned with a crown of imperishable glory?. And if the possession of a spacious and magnificent mansion contributes to human happiness, what more spacious, what more magnificent, can be conceived than heaven itself, which is illumined throughout with the brightness of God ?

====== Rewards ======
The Roman Catechism says that, while everyone will enjoy the beatific vision, not everyone will enjoy the same rewards, since one is rewarded for one's own deeds:

"For in my Father's house, says our Lord, there are many mansions," in which shall be distributed rewards of greater and of less value according to each one's deserts. He who soweth sparingly, shall also reap sparingly: and he who soweth in blessings, shall also reap blessings.

According to the Council of Trent, one does not sin when doing "good works with a view to an eternal recompense."

==== Speculation ====
===== Secondary joy =====
Catholic authors have speculated about the nature of the "secondary joy of heaven", that is Church teaching reflected in the Councils of Florence and of Trent. For God "will repay according to each one's deeds" (Romans 2:6 ): ... "the one who sows sparingly will also reap sparingly, and the one who sows bountifully will also reap bountifully" (2 Corinthians 9:6 ). Jesuit poet Gerard Manley Hopkins describes this joy as reflecting Christ to one another, each in our own personal way and to the extent that we have grown more Christlike in this life, for as Hopkins writes, "Christ plays in ten thousand places, lovely in limbs, and lovely in eyes not his, to the Father through the features of men's faces." God means to share even this divine joy with us, the joy of rejoicing in making others happy.

===== Heaven as a place or state =====
Catholic theologians have speculated about whether heaven is a place or a state - or both. Pope John Paul II said that heaven "is neither an abstraction nor a physical place in the clouds, but a living, personal relationship with the Holy Trinity."

===== Angelic hierarchy =====
In the middle ages, a hierarchy of angels, as well as a hierarchy of demons, was devised based on various interpretations of the Bible. These hierarchies and the names and descriptions of creatures therein are not part of the church's official teaching. Some saints and popes, such as Thomas Aquinas and John Paul II, endorsed them.

===== Private revelations =====
Some Catholic saints have claimed to receive private revelations of heaven. For example, Marian apparitions that depict Mary as the eschatological image of the church: shining like the Sun, wearing a beautiful crown, etc. Another example is saints visiting heaven. Some visits describe heaven in material or physical terms, such as the vision of Anna Schäffer:

While I was praying, I was enraptured from the world. My life was hanging by a thread. The clouds opened up and a marvelous garden full of flowers appeared in which I could walk a long distance...I cannot describe to you all of the marvels that our good God gives to those He loves...Yes, there are also meadows and forests, rivers and mountains, homes and buildings, but everything is transparent and spiritualized, while here on earth everything is tainted.

Other visits to heaven emphasis heaven's immaterial or spiritual features, such as the happiness one enjoys. For example, Saint Faustina wrote in her diary:

Today I was in heaven, in spirit, and I saw its unconceivable beauties and the happiness that awaits us after death. I saw how all creatures give ceaseless praise and glory to God. I saw how great is happiness in God, which spreads to all creatures, making them happy; and then all the glory and praise which springs from this happiness returns to its source; and they enter into the depths of God, contemplating the inner life of God, the Father, the Son, and the Holy Spirit, whom they will never comprehend or fathom. This source of happiness is unchanging in its essence, but it is always new, gushing forth happiness for all creatures.

Saint Faustina also said in her diary that she had a vision explaining one's freedom in heaven. She saw herself "on the altar", with people all around praying to her for graces, and God said:

Do whatever you wish, distribute graces as you will, to whom you will and when you will.

=== Protestant Christianity ===
Some denominations teach that one enters heaven at the moment of death, while others teach that this occurs at a later time (the Last Judgement). Some Protestants maintain that entry into Heaven awaits such time as "When the form of this world has passed away."

Two related, and often blended, concepts of heaven in Christianity are better described as the "resurrection of the body" as contrasted with "the immortality of the soul". In the first, the soul does not enter heaven until the Last Judgement or the "end of time" when it (along with the body) is resurrected and judged. In the second concept, the soul goes to a heaven on another plane immediately after death. These two concepts are generally combined in the doctrine of the double judgement where the soul is judged once at death and goes to a temporary heaven, while awaiting a second and final judgement at the end of the world.

Some teach that death itself is not a natural part of life, but was allowed to happen after Adam and Eve disobeyed God so that mankind would not live forever in a state of sin and thus a state of separation from God.

==== Methodist ====
Methodism teaches that heaven is a state where the faithful will spend eternal bliss with God:

Everyone that has a saving knowledge of Jesus Christ our Lord on departing from this life, goes to be in felicity with Him, and will share the eternal glories of His everlasting Kingdom; the fuller rewards and the greater glories, being reserved until the final Judgment. Matt. 25:34, 46; John 14:2, 3; II Cor. 5:6, 8, 19; Phil. 1:23, 24 —Evangelical Methodist Church Discipline (¶24)

==== Seventh-day Adventist ====
The Seventh-day Adventist understanding of heaven is:

- That heaven is a place where God resides. Described in Revelation 11:12 "they went to Heaven, wrapped in a cloud.."
- That God sent his son, Jesus Christ to Earth to live as a human being (Matthew 2:10 birth of Jesus) who "perfectly exemplified the righteousness and love of God shown by His miracles He manifested God's power and was attested as God's promised Messiah. He suffered and died voluntarily on the cross for our sins and in our place, was raised from the dead, and ascended to minister in the heavenly sanctuary in our behalf."
- That Christ promises to return as saviour at which time he will resurrect the righteous dead and gather them along with the righteous living to heaven. The unrighteous will die at Christ's second coming.
- That after Christ's second coming there will exist a period of time known as the Millennium during which Christ and his righteous saints will reign and the unrighteous will be judged. At the close of the Millennium, Christ and his angels return to Earth to resurrect the dead that remain, to issue the judgements and to forever rid the universe of sin and sinners.
- "On the new earth, in which righteousness dwells, God will provide an eternal home for the redeemed and a perfect environment for everlasting life, love, joy, and learning in His presence. For here God Himself will dwell with His people, and suffering and death will have passed away. The great controversy will be ended, and sin will be no more. All things, animate and inanimate, will declare that God is love; and He shall reign forever." It is at this point that heaven is established on the new Earth.

=== Other denominations ===
==== Christadelphians ====
Christadelphians do not believe that anyone will go to heaven upon death. Instead, they believe that only Jesus went to Heaven and resides there alongside Jehovah. Christadelphians instead believe that following death, the soul enters a state of unconsciousness, and will stay that way until the Last Judgement, where those saved will be resurrected and the damned will be annihilated. The Kingdom of God will be established on Earth, starting in the land of Israel, and Jesus will rule over the kingdom for a millennium.

==== Jehovah's Witnesses ====
Jehovah's Witnesses believe that heaven is the dwelling place of Jehovah and his spirit creatures. They believe that only 144,000 chosen faithful followers ("The Anointed") will be resurrected to heaven to rule with Christ over the majority of mankind who will live on Earth.

==== Latter Day Saint movement ====
The view of heaven according to the Latter Day Saint movement is based on section 76 of the Doctrine and Covenants as well as 1 Corinthians 15 in the King James Version of the Bible. The afterlife is divided first into two levels until the Last Judgement; afterwards it is divided into four levels, the upper three of which are referred to as "degrees of glory" that, for illustrative purposes, are compared to the brightness of heavenly bodies: the Sun, Moon, and stars.

Before the Last Judgement, spirits separated from their bodies at death go either to paradise or to spirit prison dependent on if they had been baptised and confirmed by the laying on of hands. Paradise is a place of rest while its inhabitants continue learning in preparation for the Last Judgement. Spirit prison is a place of learning for the wicked and unrepentant and those who were not baptised; however, missionary efforts done by spirits from paradise enable those in spirit prison to repent, accept the gospel and the atonement and receive baptism through the practice of baptism for the dead.

After the resurrection and Last Judgement, people are sent to one of four levels:

- The celestial kingdom is the highest level, with its power and glory comparable to the Sun. Here, faithful and valiant disciples of Christ who accepted the fullness of his gospel and kept their covenants with Him through following the prophets of their dispensation are reunited with their families and with God the Father, Jesus Christ, and the Holy Spirit for all eternity. Those who would have accepted the gospel with all their hearts had they been given the opportunity in life (as judged by Christ and God the Father) are also saved in the celestial kingdom. Latter-Day Saint movements do not espouse the concept of original sin, but believe children to be innocent through the atonement. Therefore, all children who die before the age of accountability inherit this glory. Men and women who have entered into celestial marriage are eligible, under the tutelage of God the Father, to eventually become gods and goddesses as joint-heirs with Jesus Christ.
- The terrestrial kingdom's power and glory is comparable to that of the Moon, and is reserved for those who understood and rejected the full gospel in life but lived good lives; those who did accept the gospel but failed to keep their covenants through continuing the process of faith, repentance, and service to others; those who "died without law" (D & C 76:72) but accepted the full gospel and repented after death due to the missionary efforts undertaken in spirit prison. God the Father does not come into the terrestrial kingdom, but Jesus Christ visits them and the Holy Spirit is given to them.
- The telestial kingdom is comparable to the glory of the stars. Those placed in the telestial kingdom suffered the pains of Hell after death because they were liars, murderers, adulterers, whoremongers, etc. They are eventually rescued from Hell by being redeemed through the power of the atonement at the end of the Millennium. Despite its far lesser condition in eternity, the telestial kingdom is described as being more comfortable than Earth in its current state. Suffering is a result of a full knowledge of the sins and choices which have permanently separated a person from the utter joy that comes from being in the presence of God and Jesus Christ, though they have the Holy Spirit to be with them.
- The Outer darkness is the lowest level and has no glory whatsoever. It is reserved for Satan, his angels, and those who have committed the unpardonable sin. This is the lowest state possible in the eternities, and one that very few people born in this world attain, since the unpardonable sin requires that a person know with a perfect knowledge that the gospel is true and then reject it and fight defiantly against God. The only known son of perdition is Cain, but it is generally acknowledged that there are probably more scattered through the ages.

== See also ==
- Kingdom of Heaven (Gospel of Matthew)
- Kingship and kingdom of God
