= Christian views on Hades =

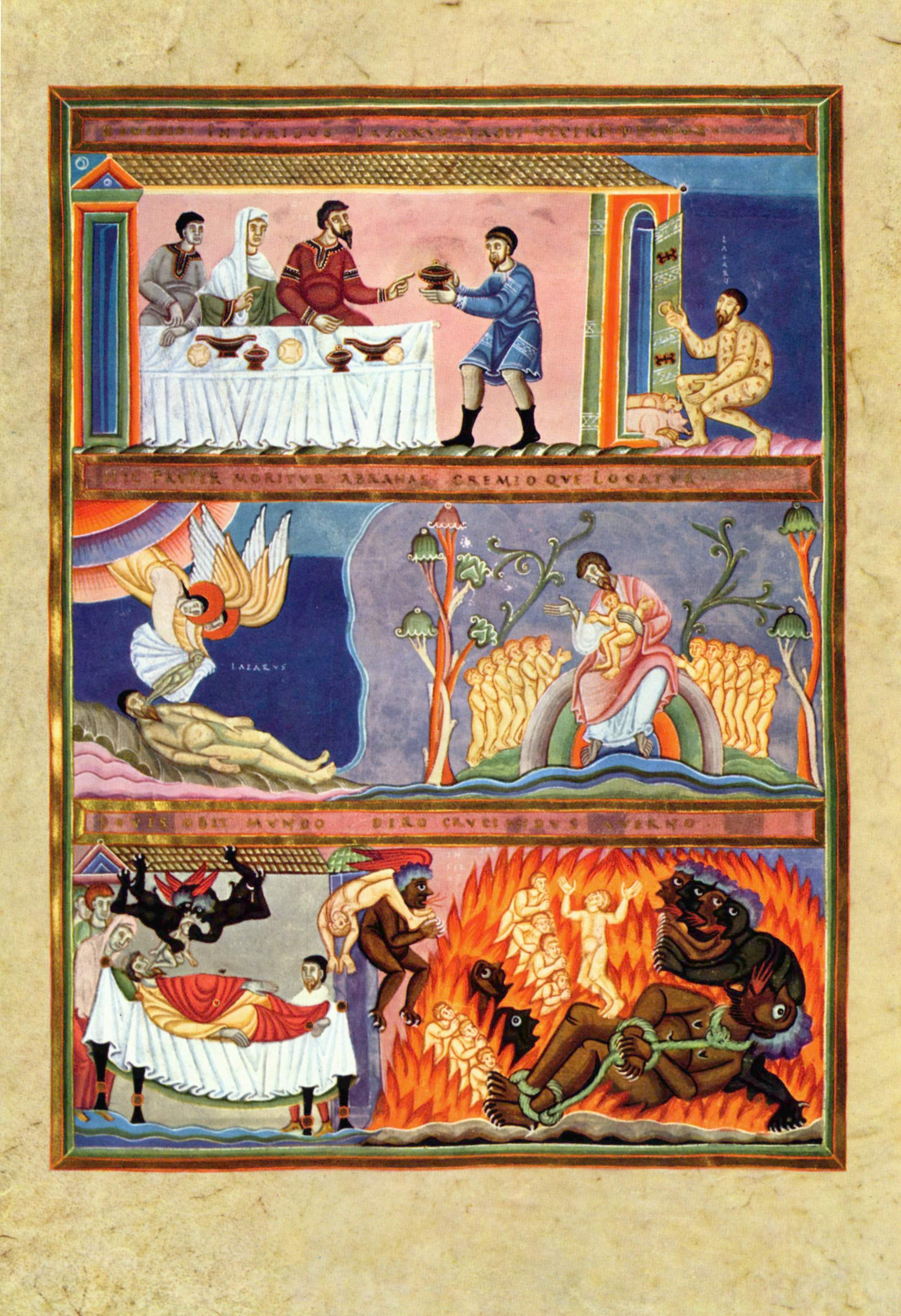
Lazarus and the Rich Man (illumination from the Codex Aureus of Echternach).

Hades, according to various Christian denominations, is "the place or state of departed spirits", borrowing the name of Hades, the name of the underworld in Greek mythology. It is often associated with the Jewish concept of Sheol. In Christian theology, Hades is seen as an intermediate state between Heaven and Hell in which the dead enter and will remain until the Last Judgment.

== In the Bible ==
=== Septuagint ===
In the Septuagint (an ancient translation of the Hebrew Bible into Greek), the Greek term ᾅδης (Hades) is used to translate the Hebrew term שאול (Sheol) in almost all instances, only three of them are not matched with Hades: Job 24:19 (γῆ, "earth, land"), Proverbs 23:14 (θάνατος, "death") and Ezekiel 32:21 (βόθρου or λάκκος, "pit".)

=== New Testament ===
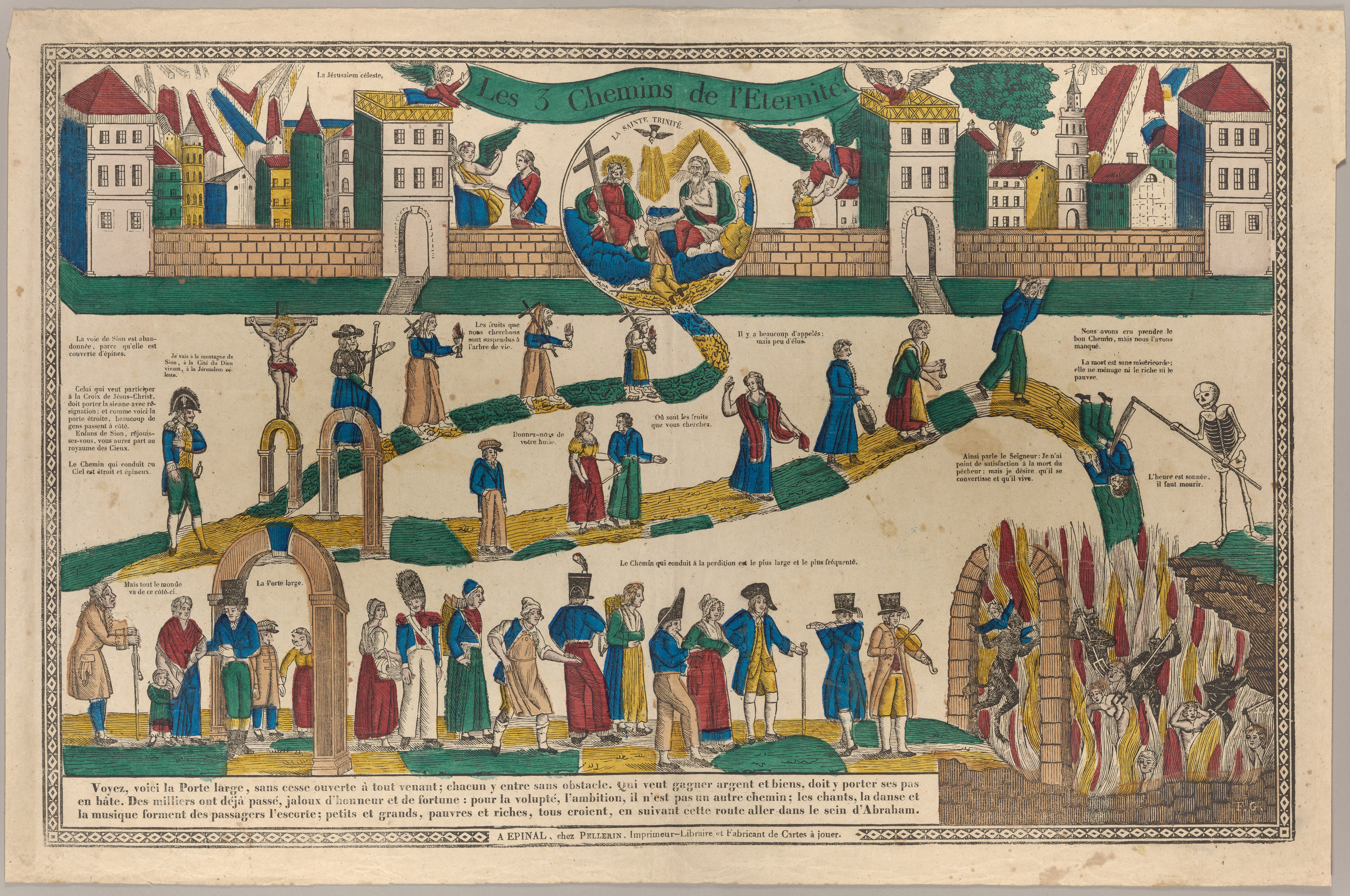
A folk-art allegorical map based on Matthew 7:13–14 Bible Gateway by the woodcutter Georgin François in 1825.

The Hebrew phrase לא־תעזב נפשׁי לשׁאול ("you will not abandon my soul to Sheol") in Psalm 16:10 is quoted in the Koine Greek New Testament, Acts 2:27 as οὐκ ἐγκαταλείψεις τὴν ψυχήν μου εἰς ᾅδου ("you will not abandon my soul to Hades").

In the Textus Receptus version of the New Testament the word ᾅδης (Hades), appears 11 times; but critical editions of the text of 1 Corinthians 15:55 have θάνατος (death) in place of ᾅδης. Except in this verse of 1 Corinthians, where it uses "grave", the King James Version translates ᾅδης as "hell". Modern translations, for which there are only 10 instances of the word ᾅδης in the New Testament, generally transliterate it as "Hades".

In all appearances but one, ᾅδης has little if any relation to afterlife rewards or punishments. The one exception is Luke's parable of Lazarus and the rich man, in which the rich man finds himself, after death, in Hades, and "in anguish in this flame", while in contrast the angels take Lazarus to "the bosom of Abraham", described as a state of comfort.

The word Hades gets mentioned twice in the Gospel of Matthew. It appears in Jesus' promise to Peter: "And I tell you that you are Peter, and on this rock I will build my church, and the gates of Hades will not overcome it." and in the warning to Capernaum: "And you, Capernaum, will you be lifted to the heavens? No, you will go down to Hades."

Death and Hades are repeatedly associated in the Book of Revelation.

== Early Christian views ==
Tertullian (c. 160 – c. 225), making an exception only for the Christian martyrs, argued that the souls of the dead go down beneath the earth, and will go up to the sky (heaven) only at the end of the world:

You must suppose Hades to be a subterranean region, and keep at arm's length those who are too proud to believe that the souls of the faithful deserve a place in the lower regions … How, indeed, shall the soul mount up to heaven, where Christ is already sitting at the Father's right hand, when as yet the archangel's trumpet has not been heard by the command of God, when as yet those whom the coming of the Lord is to find on the earth, have not been caught up into the air to meet Him at His coming, in company with the dead in Christ, who shall be the first to arise? … The sole key to unlock Paradise is your own life's blood.

The variously titled fragment "Against Plato" or "De Universo", attributed to Hippolytus of Rome (c. 170 – c. 236), has the following:

And this is the passage regarding demons. But now we must speak of Hades, in which the souls both of the righteous and the unrighteous are detained. Hades is a place in the created system, rude, a locality beneath the earth, in which the light of the world does not shine; and as the sun does not shine in this locality, there must necessarily be perpetual darkness there. This locality has been destined to be as it were a guard-house for souls, at which the angels are stationed as guards, distributing according to each one's deeds the temporary punishments for characters. And in this locality there is a certain place set apart by itself, a lake of unquenchable fire, into which we suppose no one has ever yet been cast; for it is prepared against the day determined by God, in which one sentence of righteous judgment shall be justly applied to all. And the unrighteous, and those who believed not God, who have honoured as God the vain works of the hands of men, idols fashioned, shall be sentenced to this endless punishment. But the righteous shall obtain the incorruptible and un-fading kingdom, who indeed are at present detained in Hades, but not in the same place with the unrighteous.

In his study, "Hades of Hippolytus or Tartarus of Tertullian? The Authorship of the Fragment De Universo", C. E. Hill argues that the depiction of the intermediate state of the righteous expounded in this text is radically opposed to that found in the authentic works of Hippolytus and must have been written by Tertullian.

In the Coptic Gospel of the Egyptians, an early Gnostic work, the angel Eleleth, with the intent to let something rule over Chaos and Hades, speaks and creates Sophia as a result.

== Christian usage in English ==
In English usage the word "Hades" first appears around 1600, as a transliteration of the Greek word "ᾅδης" in the line in the Apostles' Creed, "He descended into hell", the place of waiting (the place of "the spirits in prison" 1 Peter 3:19) into which Jesus is there affirmed to have gone after the Crucifixion. Because this descent, known in Old and Middle English as the Harrowing of Hell, needed to be distinguished from what had come to be more usually called "hell", i.e. the place or state of those finally damned, the word was transliterated and given a differentiated meaning.

This development whereby "hell" came to be used to mean only the "hell of the damned" affected also the Latin word infernum and the corresponding words in Latin-derived languages, as in the name "Inferno" given to the first part of Dante's Divine Comedy. Greek, on the other hand, has kept the original meaning of "ᾅδης" (Hades) and uses the word "κόλασις" (kólasis – literally, "punishment"; cf. Matthew 25:46, which speaks of "everlasting kolasis") to refer to what nowadays is usually meant by "hell" in English.

== Church teachings ==
=== Eastern Orthodox ===
The teaching of the Eastern Orthodox Church is that after the body decays, the soul – now considered a shade, is given a span of 40 Days after death to wander the earth, during which it is given the opportunity to overcome its attachments and enter Heaven as a saint, where one may intercede for others in various ways among the angels. However, if this does not occur, it journeys to the abode of the dead (Hades or Sheol), where it may experience Gehenna (Tartarus) if attached to harmful things, or Paradise (the Bosom) if attached to beneficial things, both being part of the Particular judgment, which is impermanent and serves as an intermediate state before the resurrection.

While there are exceptions of both body and soul, such as the Theotokos, who resurrected in a glorified body and was borne directly into heaven, laypeople generally remain in this condition of waiting. The term "particular judgement" refers to some having a prevision of the glory to come, while others foretaste their suffering. When Christ returns, the soul rejoins its risen body to be judged by Jesus in the Last judgment. The 'good and faithful servant' will inherit eternal life, the unfaithful with the unbeliever will spend eternity in Hades without a body, their state during the presence of God on earth is described thus: "Their sins and their unbelief will torture them as fire."

The Church of the East, Oriental Orthodoxy, the Eastern Orthodox Church and the Roman Catholic Church, hold that a final Universal Judgment will be pronounced on all human beings when soul and body are reunited in the resurrection of the dead. They also believe that the fate of those in the abode of the dead differs, even while awaiting resurrection: "The souls of the righteous are in light and rest, with a foretaste of eternal happiness; but the souls of the wicked are in a state the reverse of this."

=== Roman Catholic ===
The Latin word infernus or infernum indicated the abode of the dead and so was used as the equivalent of the Greek word "ᾅδης" (hades). It appears in both the documents quoted above, and pointed more obviously than the Greek word to an existence beneath the earth. Later, the transliteration "hades" of the Greek word ceased to be used in Latin and "infernum" became the normal way of expressing the idea of Hades. Although infernus is usually translated into English as "hell", it did not have the narrow sense that the English word has now acquired. It continued to have the generic meaning of "abode of the dead".

For the modern narrow sense the term infernum damnatorum (hell of the damned) was used, as in question 69, article 7 of the Supplement of the Summa Theologica of Thomas Aquinas, which distinguishes five states or abodes of the dead: paradise, hell of the damned, limbo of children, purgatory, and limbo of the Fathers: "The soul separated from the body is in the state of receiving good or evil for its merits; so that after death it is either in the state of receiving its final reward, or in the state of being hindered from receiving it. If it is in the state of receiving its final retribution, this happens in two ways: either in the respect of good, and then it is paradise; or in respect of evil, and thus as regards actual sin it is hell, and as regards original sin it is the limbo of children. On the other hand, if it be in the state where it is hindered from receiving its final reward, this is either on account of a defect of the person, and thus we have purgatory where souls are detained from receiving their reward at once on account of the sins they have committed, or else it is on account of a defect of nature, and thus we have the limbo of the Fathers, where the Fathers were detained from obtaining glory on account of the guilt of human nature which could not yet be expiated."

=== Lutheran ===
The Lutheran churches teach the existence of an intermediate state after the departure of the soul from the body, until the time of the Last Judgment. This intermediate state, known as Hades, is divided into two chambers: (1) Paradise for the righteous (2) Gehenna for the wicked. Unlike the Roman Catholic doctrine of purgatory, the Lutheran doctrine of Hades is not a place of purgation.

Beside, the divine narrative informs us, that there is an impassable gulf, dividing Hades into two apartments. And so great is this chasm as to render it impossible to pass from one apartment to the other. And, therefore, as this rich man and Lazarus are not on the same side of the gulf, they are not in the same place. They are both in Hades, but not the same apartment of it. The apartment to which the rich man went, the Scriptures call Γέεννα hell; and that to which Lazarus went, they call PARADISE, Abraham's bosom, Paradise, heaven. And, therefore, inasmuch as all spirits, upon hearing their sentence, must pass away into one of these apartments, it is conclusive, that the good will go to where Lazarus and the dying thief are, with Jesus in ουρανός, heaven, which is in Hades; and the bad will go where the rich man is in Γέεννα, hell, also in Hades. So that the spirit, after its departure from the body, after hearing its doom, and upon the execution of the sentence, enters immediately into Hades, either to a state and place of suffering or of enjoyment. And here, in Hades, the righteous enjoy bliss, such as 'eye hath not seen, nor ear heard, not the heart of man conceived.' But the wicked experience miseries such as are represented by the gnawings of "the worm that never dies," and burnings of "the fire that is never quenched." But once more: the state of spirits in Hades, between death and judgment, is not one of probation, nor yet or purgation.

=== Anabaptist ===
Anabaptist Christians distinguish between the intermediate state that one enters after death, and the final state after the Last Judgment:

ARTICLE XVIL OF THE INTERMEDIATE STATE: We believe that in the interval between death and resurrection, the righteous will be with Christ in a state of conscious bliss and comfort, but that the wicked will be in a place of torment, in a state of conscious suffering and despair. Lu. 16:19-31; 23:43; Phil. 1:23; II Cor. 5:1-8; I Thes. 5:10; II Pet. 2:9 (R.V.).

ARTICLE XVII. OF THE FINAL STATE: We believe that hell is the place of torment, prepared for the devil and his angels, where with them the wicked will suffer the vengeance of eternal fire forever and ever and that heaven is the final abode of the righteous, where they will dwell in the fullness of joy forever and ever. Matt. 25:41, 46; Jude 7; Rev. 14:8-11; 20:10, 15; II Cor. 5:21; Rev. 21:3-8; 22:1-5. —1921 Garden City Confession of Faith (Mennonite Anabaptist)

=== Anglican ===
The Anglican Catechist states that "there is an intermediate state between death and the resurrection, in which the soul does not sleep in unconsciousness, but exists in happiness or misery till the resurrection, when it shall be reunited to the body and receive its final reward." John Henry Hobart, an Anglican bishop, writes that "Hades, or the place of the dead, is represented as a spacious receptacle with gates, through which the dead enter." This space is divided into Paradise and Gehenna "but with an impassable gulf between the two". Souls, with exception of martyrs and saints, remain in Hades until the Final Judgment and "Christians may also improve in holiness after death during the middle state before the final judgment". As such, many Anglicans pray for the dead.

=== Methodist ===
In the Methodist Church, "hades denotes the intermediate state of souls between death and the general resurrection," which is divided into Paradise (for the righteous) and Gehenna (for the wicked). After the general judgment, hades will be abolished. John Wesley, the founder of Methodism, "made a distinction between hell (the receptacle of the damned) and hades (the receptacle of all separate spirits), and also between paradise (the antechamber of heaven) and heaven itself." The dead will remain in Hades "until the Day of Judgment when we will all be bodily resurrected and stand before Christ as our Judge. After the Judgment, the Righteous will go to their eternal reward in Heaven and the Accursed will depart to Hell (see Genesis 25)."

=== The dead as unconscious ===
Several groups of Christians believe in Christian mortalism or "soul sleep" and in the general judgment ("Last Judgment") only. Denominations that see the dead in the intermediate state as not having consciousness include early Unitarians, Christian universalism, Christadelphians, Seventh-day Adventists and Jehovah's Witnesses. These groups also believe that Christ too was dead, unconscious and "asleep" during his time in the grave.

Seventh-day Adventists believe that Hell and Hades are not places of eternal suffering, but of eternal death and that death is a state of unconscious sleep until the resurrection. They base this belief on biblical texts such as Ecclesiastes 9:5 which states "the dead know not any thing", and 1 Thessalonians 4:13 which contains a description of the dead being raised from the grave at the second coming. They also hold that Hell is not an eternal place and that the descriptions of it as "eternal" or "unquenchable" does not mean that the fire will never go out. They base this idea in other biblical cases such as the "eternal fire" that was sent as punishment to the people of Sodom and Gomorrah, that later extinguished. (Jude 1:7)

The Church of England has a variety of views on the death state. Some, such as N. T. Wright have proposed a view of the grave which considers Hades to be a place where the dead sleep, and E. W. Bullinger argued for the cessation of the soul between death and resurrection.

Proponents of the mortality of the soul argue that the story of the rich man and Lazarus is a parable using the framework of Jewish views of the Bosom of Abraham, and is metaphorical, and is not definitive teaching on the intermediate state for several reasons. After being emptied of the dead, Hades and death are thrown into the lake of fire in Revelation 20:13–14.

== See also ==
- Barzakh
- Discourse to the Greeks concerning Hades
- Greek underworld
- Hell in Christianity
- Purgatory
- Spirit world (Spiritualism)
