= Hamistagan =

As described in the 9th century Zoroastrian text Dadestan-i Denig ("Religious Decisions"), hamistagan or hamēstagān is a neutral place or state for the departed souls of those whose good deeds and bad deeds were equal in life. Here these souls await Judgment Day. Meanwhile, those who did mostly good experience bliss and those who did mostly evil suffer torment. Religious Decisions was written in Persia (modern day Iran) when Islam was replacing Zoroastrianism as the majority religion.

The Encyclopædia Iranica considers this a late idea and perhaps comes from the queries of Zoroastrian theologians

Hamistagan can be compared to Roman Catholic purgatory because it occupies a position between heaven and hell, but hamistagan is a place of waiting, not punishment and purification. As a neutral place, hamistagan is more like the Roman Catholic limbo.

== See also ==
- Barzakh
- Christian views on Hades
- Zoroastrian eschatology
