= 40th Day after death =

Traditional memorial service

The 40th Day after death is a traditional memorial service, family gathering, ceremony and ritual in memory of the departed on the 40th day after his or her death. The observation of the 40th day after death occurs in Eastern Christian groups like Eastern Orthodox Church, Oriental Orthodox denominations like the Syriac Orthodox Church & the Tewahedo churches alongside Church of the East and their offshoot Catholic counterparts. The ritual represents spiritual intercession on the part of the dead, who are believed to collectively await the Day of Judgment. Thus, these rituals may be conducted for an individual, like commemoration of the 40th day after death, or for all dead souls.

== Notable memorial services ==
- The Iranian government held 40th day memorial services for Ali Khamenei after his assassination.

== See also ==
- Memorial service in the Eastern Orthodox Church
- Arbaʽeen Commemoration the 40th day after the martyrdom of Husayn ibn Ali (Shia Islam)
- ja:四十九日 (gathering of family and relatives of, and praying for a person in Japan, 49 days after the person dies)
