= Particular judgment =

Divine judgment occurring immediately after death

Particular judgment, according to Christian eschatology, is the divine judgment that a departed (dead) person undergoes immediately after death, in contradistinction to the general judgment (or Last Judgment) of all people at the end of the world.

== Old Testament ==
There are few, if any, Old Testament or apocryphal writings that could be construed as implying particular judgment. The first century Jewish pseudepigraphal writing known as the Testament of Abraham includes a clear account of particular judgment, in which souls go either through the wide gate of destruction or the narrow gate of salvation. By this account, only one in seven thousand earn salvation. The Testament of Abraham is regarded as scripture by Beta Israel Ethiopian Jews, but not by any other Jewish or Christian group.

== New Testament ==
Many Christians believe the dead are judged immediately after death and await judgment day in peace or torment because of the way they interpret several key New Testament passages. In Luke 16:19–31, it appears that Christ represents Lazarus and Dives as receiving their respective rewards immediately after death. The penitent thief was promised: "Truly, I say to you, today you will be with me in paradise." (Luke 23:43)

Paul the Apostle generally depicts death as sleep awaiting the resurrection of a glorified body (1 Thessalonians 4:13–18), and (in 2 Corinthians 5) longs to be absent from the body that he may be present to the Lord, evidently understanding death to be the entrance into his reward at an unspecified time (cf. Philippians 1:21–30).

Some Christians believe that death is a period of dormancy, or sleep in the body, or an intermediate state, on Earth, or in the Bosom of Abraham, in which there is no consciousness and no Heavenly activity has yet begun – no judgment, no trip to heaven nor hell – based on their interpretation of the following scriptures: "The dead know not anything ... Their love, their hatred, and their envy is now perished" (Ecclesiastes 9:5); "In death there is no remembrance of thee; in the grave, who shall give thee thanks?" (Psalm 6:5); "The dead praise not the Lord, neither any that go down into silence" (Psalm 115:17); "The grave cannot praise thee: death cannot celebrate thee" (Isaiah 38:18). They find no support for a trip to heaven because of how they interpret John 3:13 which states that "No man hath ascended up to heaven" and even "David is not ascended into the heavens" and Acts 2:34 states that "The heaven, even the heavens, are the Lord's, but the earth hath he given to the children of men" (Psalm 115:16). While they do believe these Christians are dead, they believe they will rise again, having "died in faith, not having received the promises, but having seen them afar off, and were persuaded of them, and embraced them" (Hebrews 11:13). In this view, Judgment occurs, "when the seventh angel sounds, "Thy wrath is come, and the time of the dead that they should be judged, and that thou shouldest give reward unto thy servants the prophets" (Revelation 11:15–18). The same matter also concerns the World to Come.

The uniqueness and irrepeatability of the earthly life is stated in Hebrews 9:27: "And as it is appointed unto men once to die, but after this the judgment".

== Early Christian writings ==
Some early Church Fathers, apparently including Justin, Irenaeus, and Clement of Alexandria, believed that, in general, the saved did not enter heaven until Judgment Day, and during the interval between death and the resurrection they dwell happily in a delightful abode, awaiting their final glorification. Exceptions were admitted for the martyrs and some other classes of saints, who were admitted at once to the supreme joys of heaven.

After this "particular judgment", according to Orthodox dogmatic theology, the soul experiences a foretaste of the blessedness or the eternal torment that awaits it after the resurrection.

Tertullian (c. 200) wrote that, even before final judgment, a soul "undergoes punishment and consolation in Hades in the interval, while it awaits its alternative of judgment, in a certain anticipation either of gloom or of glory".

Hippolytus of Rome pictured a particular judgment of souls in Hades, by which the righteous are assigned to "a locality full of light" and the unrighteous are "forc(ed) down into the lower parts".

Augustine of Hippo (d. 430), one of the Church Fathers of the Catholic Church, wrote that the human part of the city of God (as opposed to the part composed of the angels) "is either sojourning on earth, or, in the persons of those who have passed through death, is resting in the secret receptacles and abodes of disembodied spirits". He said that the dead are judged at death and divided into four groups: the place of the truly virtuous, such as saints and martyrs, is Paradise; the unmistakably evil are damned to eternal punishment in hell; the two intermediate groups, the not completely wicked, and the not completely good, could be helped by the prayers of the living, though it seems that for the former repentance and the prayers of the living created a "more tolerable" hell, while the latter would pass through a penitential fire before being admitted to heaven at the time of the Last Judgment. This idea would be influential in Western Christianity until the twelfth century and beyond.

== Medieval concepts ==
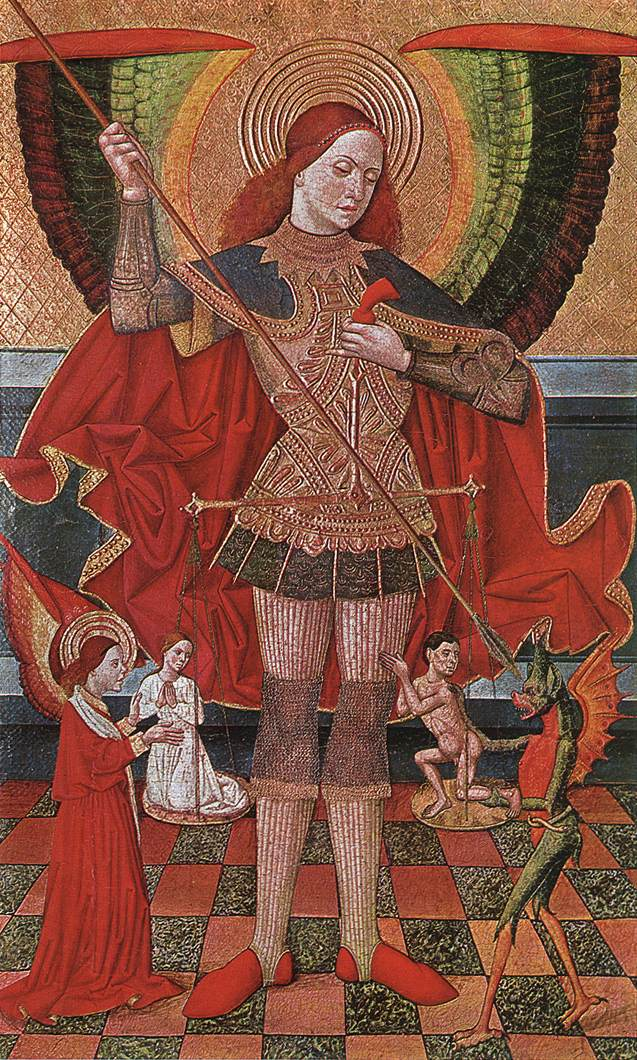
Saint Michael weighing souls

The Venerable Bede (c. 700), records an account of a man who had died, seen the afterlife, and returned to life to tell about it. According to this vision of particular judgment, there are four states into which the dead are placed: the eternally damned in hell, those who will enter heaven on judgment day but meanwhile are punished, those who will enter heaven on judgment day but meanwhile are at peace, and those already pure enough to enter heaven.

In the supplement to the Summa Theologiae, a disciple of Thomas Aquinas argued that the soul departs for heaven or hell immediately on death, "unless it be held back by some debt, for which its flight must needs be delayed until the soul is first of all cleansed."

In 1336, Pope Benedict XII (1334–1342) issued the Bull Benedictus Deus confirming the teaching that souls receive immediately after death their reward or punishment, ending a controversy caused by his predecessor, Pope John XXII (1316–1334), who had personally held for a while that even pure souls would be delayed in enjoying the beatific vision.

From about 1300, the term Limbo of Infants appeared, developed in parallel to the Limbo of the Fathers (the temporal abode of the Fathers in Hades awaiting the advent of Christ) but was thought to be eternal. In contrast to the Hell of the Damned, the Limbo was thought as a place where souls enjoyed natural happiness and suffered no punishments except for the lack of the beatific vision. Limbo was widely held in theology but never was defined as part of Catholic doctrine.

== Catholic Church ==
According to Augustine of Hippo (354–430 AD), the departed souls are judged as they leave the body and before the Resurrection of the Flesh.

According to the Catechism of the Catholic Church:

1021 Death puts an end to human life as the time open to either accepting or rejecting the divine grace manifested in Christ. The New Testament speaks of judgment primarily in its aspect of the final encounter with Christ in his second coming, but also repeatedly affirms that each will be rewarded immediately after death in accordance with his works and faith. The parable of the poor man Lazarus and the words of Christ on the cross to the good thief, as well as other New Testament texts speak of a final destiny of the soul—a destiny which can be different for some and for others.

1022 Each man receives his eternal retribution in his immortal soul at the very moment of his death, in a particular judgment that refers his life to Christ: either entrance into the blessedness of heaven—through a purification or immediately—or immediate and everlasting damnation.

— Catechism of the Catholic Church, pp. 1021–1022

According to the Catholic doctrine after death all "those who die in God's grace and friendship and are perfectly purified" go directly to Heaven; but "all who die in God's grace and friendship, but still imperfectly purified ... they undergo purification, so as to achieve the holiness necessary to enter the joy of heaven." Pope John Paul II affirmed that "according to Old Testament religious law, what is destined for God must be perfect". Purgatory "isn't a place, but a condition of existence" for "those who, after death, exist in a state of purification", who "removes from them the remnants of imperfection". They "are not separated from God but are immersed in the love of Christ", belonging to the Mystical Body of Christ and, by virtue of his mediation and intercession, to the Communion of Saints. Catholic believers can relieve their state and shorten its duration, through deeds of mercy and prayers, like the Votive Mass. Finally, "those who die in a state of mortal sin descend [immediately] into Hell".

== Reformation concepts ==
John Calvin argued that the dead are conscious while awaiting Judgment Day, either in bliss or torment depending on their fate.

== Non-Christian religions ==
With the rise of the cult of Osiris during the Middle Kingdom (c. 2040–1640 BC) in Ancient Egypt the "democratization of religion" offered to even his humblest followers the prospect of eternal life, with moral fitness becoming the dominant factor in determining a person's suitability. At death a person faced judgment by a tribunal of forty-two divine judges. If they led a life in conformance with the precepts of the goddess Maat, who represented truth and right living, the person was welcomed into the kingdom of Osiris. If found guilty, the person was thrown to a "devourer" and did not share in eternal life. The person who is taken by the devourer is subject first to terrifying punishment and then annihilated. These depictions of punishment may have influenced medieval perceptions of the inferno in hell via early Christian and Coptic texts. Purification for those who are considered justified may be found in the descriptions of "Flame Island", where they experience the triumph over evil and rebirth. For the damned complete destruction into a state of non-being awaits but there is no suggestion of eternal torture. Divine pardon at judgment was always a central concern for the ancient Egyptians.

In his Myth of Er, Plato (c. 400 BC) wrote that each soul is judged after death and either sent to heaven for a reward or to the underworld for punishment. After its reward or punishment, the soul is reincarnated. He also described the judgment of souls immediately after death in the dialogue Gorgias.

According to the 9th century Zoroastrian text Dadestan-i Denig ("Religious Decisions"), a soul is judged three days after death. Depending on the soul's balance of good and bad deeds, it goes to heaven, hell, or hamistagan, a neutral place. In its appropriate place, the soul awaits Judgment Day.

In Islam, according to hadith books, the angels Nakir and Munkar interrogate a recently deceased soul, which then remains in its grave in a state of bliss or torment until Judgment Day.
