= Jehovah's Witnesses and salvation =

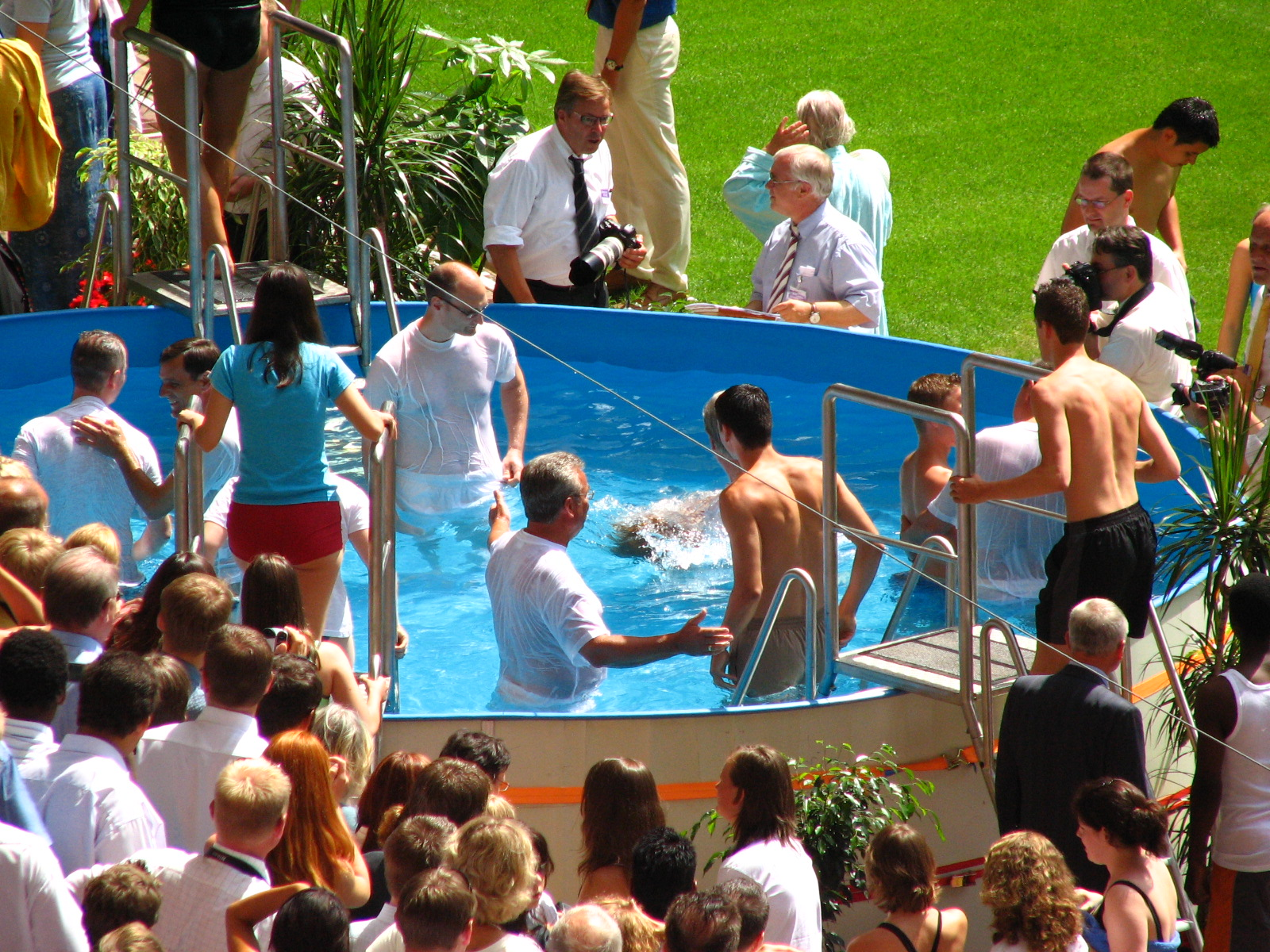
Jehovah's Witnesses being baptized

Jehovah's Witnesses believe salvation is a gift from God attained by being part of "God's organization" and putting faith in Jesus' ransom sacrifice. They do not believe in predestination or eternal security. They believe in different forms of resurrection for two groups of Christians: that the 144,000 members of the anointed will be rulers in heaven and that "the other sheep" or "the great crowd" will live forever on a paradise earth.

== Basis ==
Jehovah's Witnesses teach that salvation is possible only through Christ's ransom sacrifice and that individuals cannot be saved until they repent of their sins and call on the name of Jehovah. Salvation is described as a free gift from God, but is said to be unattainable without good works that are prompted by faith. The works prove faith is genuine. Preaching is said to be one of the works necessary for salvation, both of themselves and those to whom they preach.

They believe that baptism as a member of Jehovah's Witnesses is "a vital step toward gaining salvation", and that people can be saved by identifying God's organization. They believe that conforming to the moral requirements set out in the Bible is essential for salvation.

The Witnesses reject the doctrine of universal salvation, as well as that of predestination or fate. They believe that all intelligent creatures are endowed with free will. They regard salvation to be a result of a person's own decisions, not of fate. They reject the concept of "once saved, always saved" (or "eternal security"), instead believing that one must remain faithful until the end to be saved.

Regarding whether non-Witnesses will be saved, they believe that Jesus has the responsibility of judging such ones, and that no human can judge for themselves who will be saved. Based on their interpretation of Acts 24:15, they believe there will be a resurrection of righteous and unrighteous people. They believe that non-Witnesses alive now may attain salvation if they "begin to serve God".

== The anointed ==
Jehovah's Witnesses believe that exactly 144,000 faithful Christians go to heaven to rule with Christ in the kingdom of God, referencing Revelation 14:1-4. The anointed will serve alongside Jesus as kings and priests to form a heavenly government that will rule over the earth for 1,000 years. These will perform priestly duties that will restore mankind to the righteous conditions that God originally intended. They believe most are already in heaven and that only a "remnant", or a small number, would be alive on earth during the last days. These will be immediately taken to heaven some time during the great tribulation. The Witnesses understand Jesus’ words at John 3:3—"except a man be born again, he cannot see the kingdom of God"—to apply to the 144,000 who are "born again" as "anointed" sons of God in heaven.

Jehovah's Witnesses are taught that the New Testament, which they refer to as the Christian Greek Scriptures, is primarily directed to the anointed and by extension, to those associated with them. They believe that the "Israel of God" (Galatians 6:16), "little flock" (Luke 12:32), "New Jerusalem," and "the bride, the Lamb's wife" (Revelation 21:2,9) in the New Testament also refer to the same group of anointed Christians.

According to The Watchtower, anointed individuals receive a clear conviction from God's holy spirit that they have been chosen, based on their understanding of Romans 8:16. This experience may not be dramatic or outwardly visible, but is described as a deep internal awareness of a heavenly calling. Those who receive this calling are said to have their hope and outlook transformed, coming to deeply desire life in heaven rather than on earth. Members who claim to be anointed are not given special treatment by other congregation members. Only those in the anointed class partake of the unleavened bread and wine at the yearly Memorial of Christ's Death.

== The "other sheep" and the "great crowd" ==
Watch Tower Society literature states that Jesus' use of the term "other sheep" in John 10:16 was intended to indicate that the majority of his followers were not part of the 144,000 and would have an earthly, rather than heavenly, hope. In the resurrection, those who died faithful to God are included in the "other sheep" and will receive the "resurrection of the righteous" ("just" KJV) mentioned in Acts 24:15. Those who died without faithfully serving God will receive the "resurrection of the… unrighteous" ("unjust" KJV). They will be given an opportunity to gain God's favor and join Jesus' 'other sheep' and live forever in an earthly paradise.

Individuals unfavorably judged by God are not resurrected, and are said to be in Gehenna, which they consider to be a metaphor for eternal destruction. Those of the "other sheep" who are alive today, some of whom survive through Armageddon without needing a resurrection, are referred to as the "great crowd".

== See also ==
- Eschatology of Jehovah's Witnesses
- Jehovah's Witnesses beliefs

== Bibliography ==
- Chryssides, George D. (2008). Historical Dictionary of Jehovah's Witnesses. Lanham, Maryland: Scarecrow Press. p. 122. ISBN 9780810860742. "See "Salvation""
- Penton, M. James. (1997). "Chapter 7, "Major Doctrines"". Apocalypse Delayed: The Story of Jehovah's Witnesses (2nd ed.). Toronto: University of Toronto Press. pp. 184–210. ISBN 9780802079732.
