= Last Judgment =

Concept of final judgement originating in Zoroastrianism

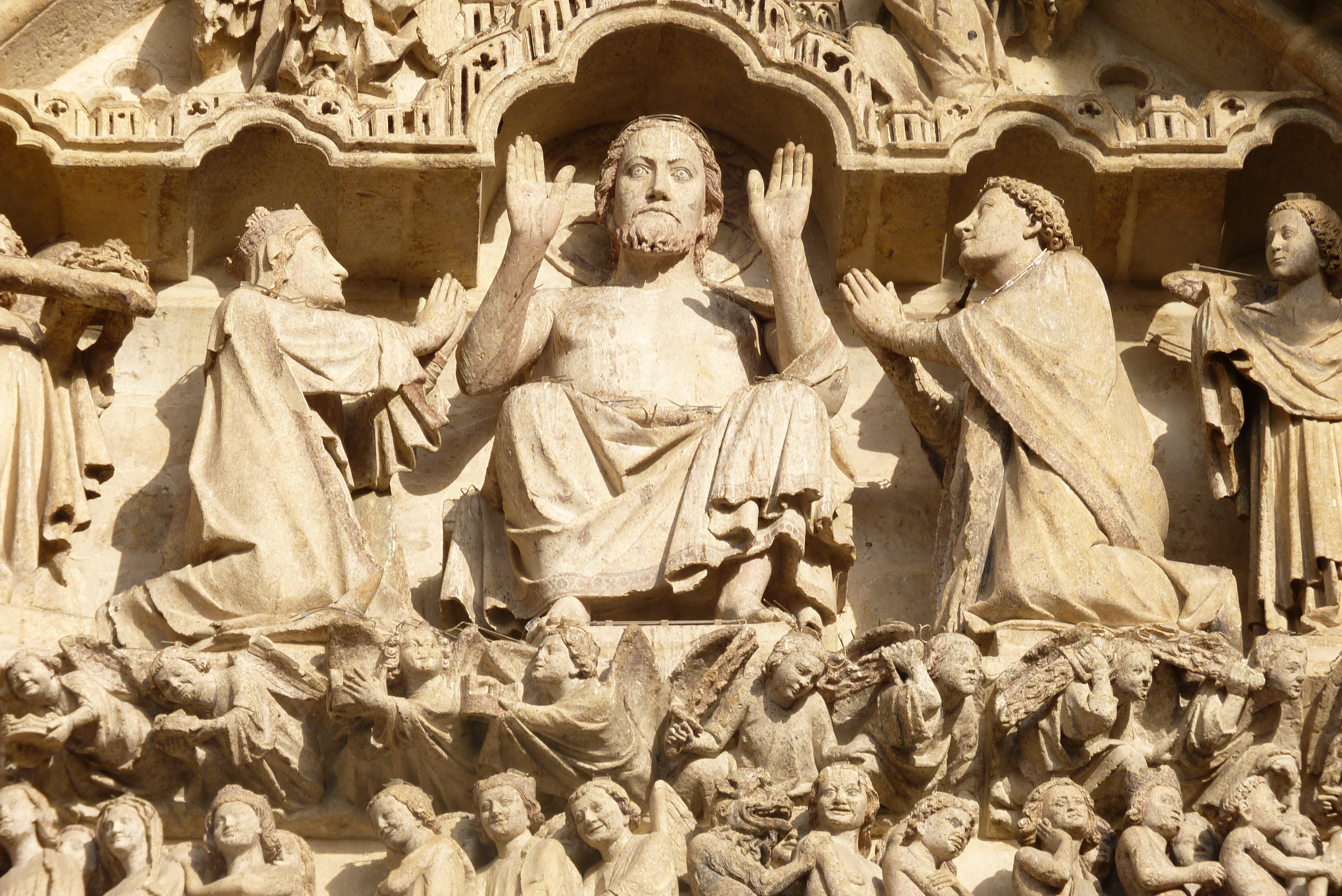
The Last Judgment of sinners by Jesus Christ; carving on the central portal of Amiens Cathedral, France.

The Last Judgment (Note: Also known as the Final Judgment, Judgment Day, Doomsday, Day of Reckoning, Day of Judgment, Day of Resurrection or The Day of the Lord.) (Note: Hebrew: יום הדין, romanized: Yom ha-Dīn; Arabic: یوم القيامة, romanized: Yawm al-Qiyāmah or یوم الدین, Yawm ad-Dīn.) is a concept originating in Zoroastrianism and found across the Abrahamic religions.

Christianity considers the Second Coming of Jesus Christ to entail the final judgment by God of all people who have ever lived, resulting in the salvation of a few and the damnation of many. Some Christian denominations believe most people will be saved, some believe most people will be damned, and some believe the number of the saved and of the damned is unknown. The concept of the Last Judgment is found in all the canonical gospels, particularly in the Gospel of Matthew. The Christian tradition is also followed by Islam, where it is mentioned in many chapters of the Quran, according to some interpretations.

The Last Judgment has inspired numerous artistic depictions, including painting, sculpture and evangelical work.

== In Zoroastrianism ==
Frashokereti is the earliest surviving articulation of a final judgement in any religion. It refers to the Zoroastrian doctrine of a final renovation of the universe, when evil will be destroyed, and everything else will be then in perfect unity with God (Ahura Mazda).

The doctrinal premises are (1) good will eventually prevail over evil; (2) creation was initially perfectly good, but was subsequently corrupted by evil; (3) the world will ultimately be restored to the perfection it had at the time of creation; (4) the "salvation for the individual depended on the sum of [that person's] thoughts, words and deeds, and there could be no intervention, whether compassionate or capricious, by any divine being to alter this." Thus, each human bears responsibility for their own fate, and simultaneously shares in the responsibility for the fate of the world.

== In Judaism ==
In Judaism, beliefs vary. Rosh HaShanah is sometimes referred to as a 'day of judgement', but it is not conceptualized as the Day of Judgement. Some rabbis hold that there will be a future day following the resurrection of the dead. Others hold that the final accounting and judgment happens when one dies. Still others hold that the Last Judgment applies to only the gentiles, not the Jewish People. The Babylonian Talmud has a lengthy passage describing the future Judgement Day.

== In Christianity ==
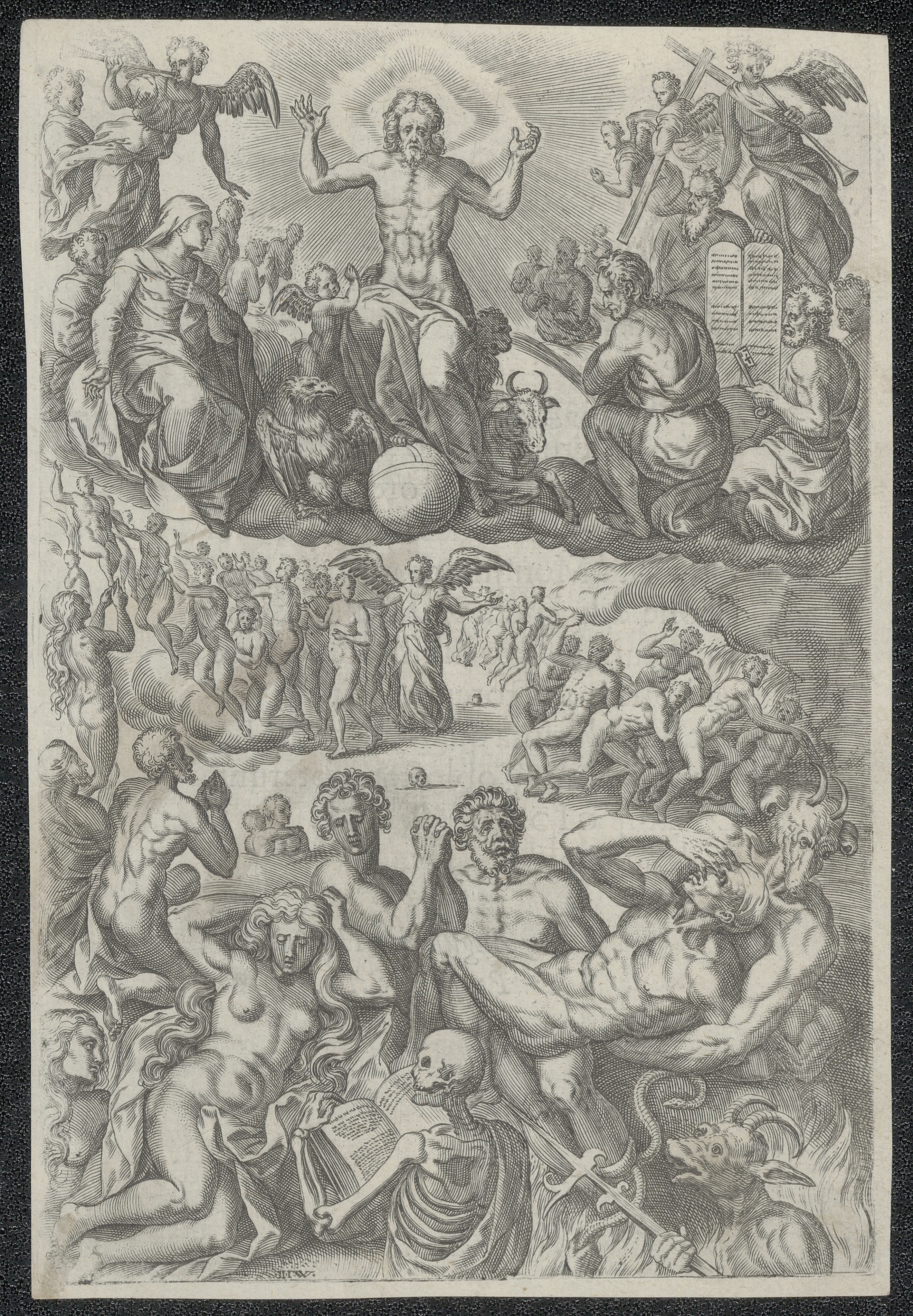
Print of the Last Judgment, made by Johannes Wierix in the 16th century

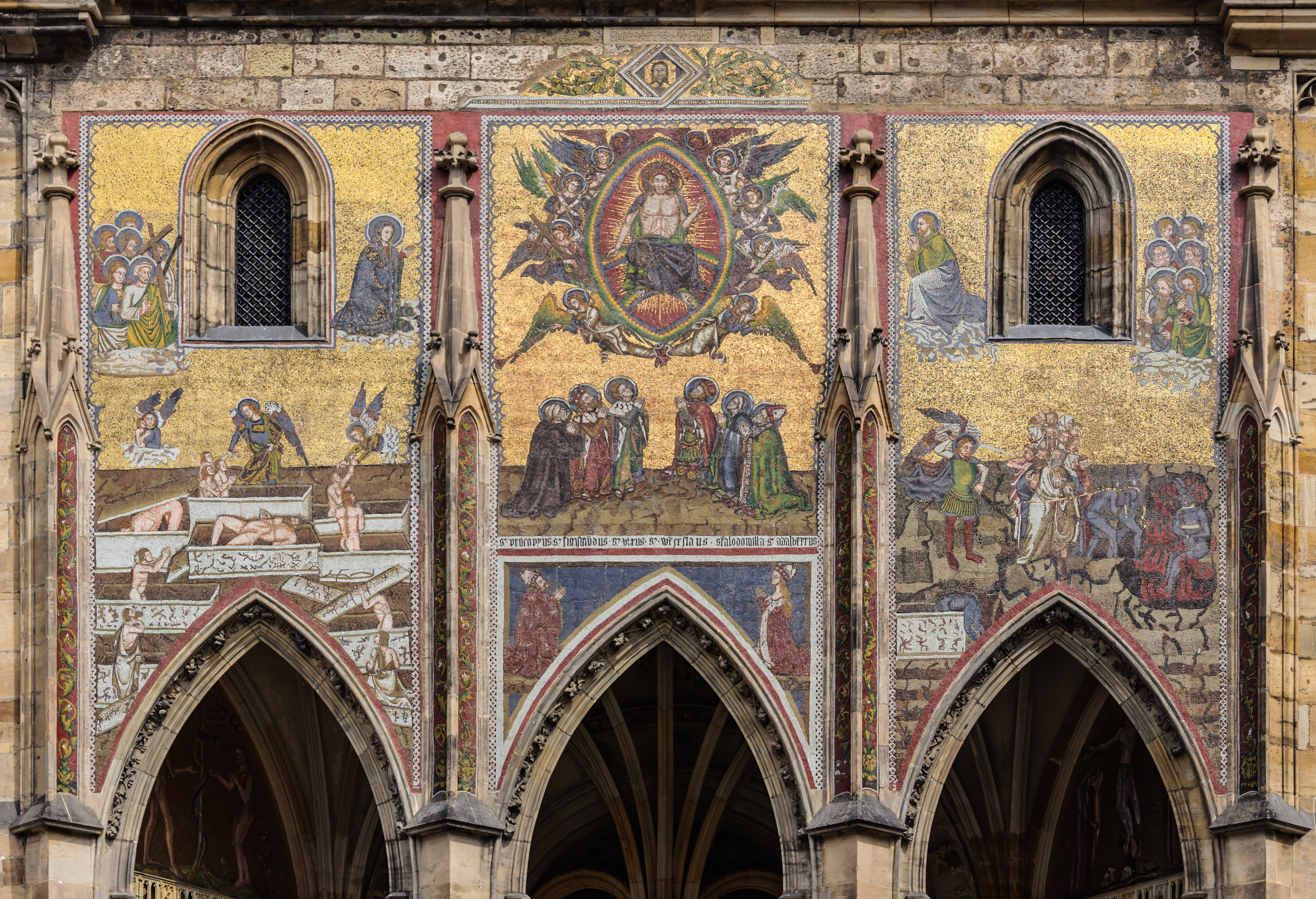
The Last Judgment mosaic (14th century), south facade of Saint Vitus Cathedral, Prague, Czech Republic

=== Biblical sources ===
The doctrine and iconographic depiction of the Last Judgment are drawn from many passages from the apocalyptic sections of the Bible, but most notably from Jesus' teaching of the narrow gate in the Gospel of Matthew and in the Gospel of Luke.

==== Salvation and damnation ====
In Christianity, there are three main beliefs about who will be saved (go to heaven) and who will be damned (go to hell) on Judgment Day. All three beliefs are based on biblical interpretation and Christian tradition.

Some Christians who believe in universal salvation say most people and angels will go to heaven on Judgment Day. Some Christians who believe in double predestination say most people and angels will go to hell on Judgment Day. Other Christians who disbelieve in universal salvation and double predestination say the number of the saved and of the damned on Judgment Day is unknown.

==== Anglicanism and Methodism ====
Article IV – Of the Resurrection of Christ in Anglicanism's Articles of Religion and Article III – Of the Resurrection of Christ of Methodism's Articles of Religion state that:

Christ did truly rise again from death, and took again his body, with flesh, bones, and all things appertaining to the perfection of Man's nature; wherewith he ascended into Heaven, and there sitteth, until he return to judge all Men at the last day.

Anglican and Methodist theology holds that "there is an intermediate state between death and the resurrection of the dead, in which the soul does not sleep in unconsciousness, but exists in happiness or misery till the resurrection, when it shall be reunited to the body and receive its final reward." This space, termed Hades, is divided into Paradise (the Bosom of Abraham) and Gehenna "but with an impassable gulf between the two". Souls remain in Hades until the Last Judgment and "Christians may also improve in holiness after death during the middle state before the final judgment".

Anglican and Methodist theology holds that at the time of the Last Day, "Jesus will return and that He will 'judge both the quick [the living] and the dead'," and "all [will] be bodily resurrected and stand before Christ as our Judge. After the Judgment, the Righteous will go to their eternal reward in heaven, and the Accursed will depart to hell (see Matthew 25)." The "issue of this judgment shall be a permanent separation of the evil and the good, the righteous and the wicked" (see The Sheep and the Goats). Moreover, in "the final judgment every one of our thoughts, words, and deeds will be known and judged," and individuals will be justified on the basis of their faith in Jesus. However, "our works will not escape God's examination."

==== Catholicism ====
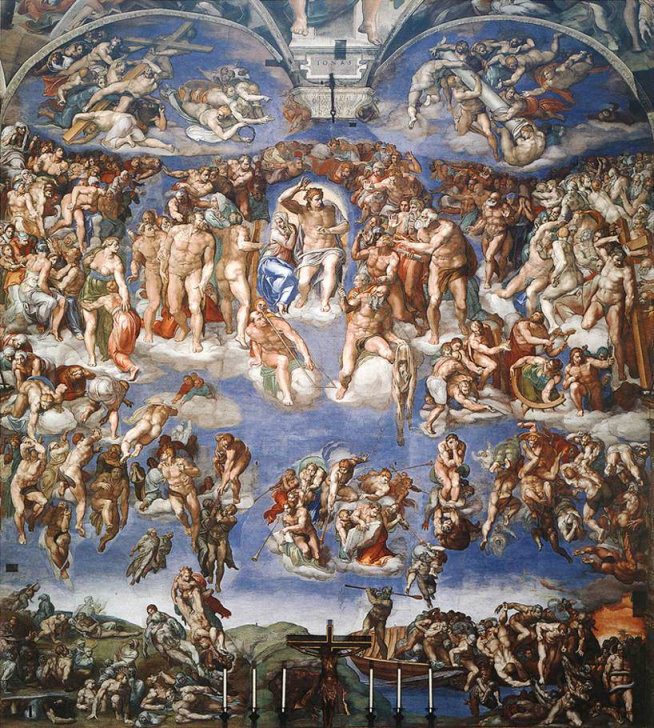
The Last Judgment, Sistine Chapel by Michelangelo (1536–1541)

Belief in the Last Judgment (often linked with the general judgment) is held firmly in Catholicism. Immediately upon death, each person undergoes the particular judgment, and depending upon one's behavior on earth, goes to heaven, purgatory, or hell. Those in purgatory will always reach heaven, but those in hell will be there eternally.

The Last Judgment will occur after the resurrection of the dead, and "our 'mortal body' will come to life again." The Catholic Church teaches that at the time of the Last Judgment Christ will come in His glory, and all the angels with him, and in his presence the truth of each one's deeds will be laid bare. Each person who has ever lived will be judged with perfect justice. The believers who are deemed worthy as well as those ignorant of Christ's teaching who followed the dictates of conscience will go to everlasting bliss; those who are judged unworthy will go to everlasting condemnation.

A decisive factor in the Last Judgment will be the question, were the corporal works of mercy practiced or not during one's lifetime. They rate as important acts of charity. Therefore, and according to the biblical sources (Mt 25:31–46), the conjunction of the Last Judgment and the works of mercy is frequent in the pictorial tradition of Christian art.

Before the Last Judgment, all will be resurrected. Those who were in purgatory will have already been purged, meaning they would have already been released into heaven, and so like those in heaven and hell will resurrect with their bodies, followed by the Last Judgment.

According to the Catechism of the Catholic Church:

1038 The resurrection of all the dead, "of both the just and the unjust" (Acts 24:15), will precede the Last Judgment. This will be "the hour when all who are in the tombs will hear [the Son of man's] voice and come forth, those who have done good, to the resurrection of life, and those who have done evil, to the resurrection of judgment" (Jn 5:28–29) Then Christ will come "in his glory, and all the angels with him... . Before him will be gathered all the nations, and he will separate them one from another as a shepherd separates the sheep from the goats, and he will place the sheep at his right hand, but the goats at the left... . And they will go away into eternal punishment, but the righteous into eternal life" (Mt 25:31, 32, 46).

1039 In the presence of Christ, who is Truth itself, the truth of each man's relationship with God will be laid bare (Cf. Jn 12:49). The Last Judgment will reveal even to its furthest consequences the good each person has done or failed to do during his earthly life.

1040 The Last Judgment will come when Christ returns in glory. Only the Father knows the day and the hour; only he determines the moment of its coming. Then through his Son Jesus Christ he will pronounce the final word on all history. We shall know the ultimate meaning of the whole work of creation and of the entire economy of salvation and understand the marvelous ways by which his Providence led everything towards its final end. The Last Judgment will reveal that God's justice triumphs over all the injustices committed by his creatures and that God's love is stronger than death. (Cf. Song 8:6)

— Catechism of the Catholic Church

The Eastern Orthodox and Catholic teachings of the Last Judgment differ only on the exact nature of the in-between state of purgatory/Abraham's Bosom. These differences may only be apparent and not actual due to differing theological terminology and evolving tradition.

==== Eastern Orthodoxy ====
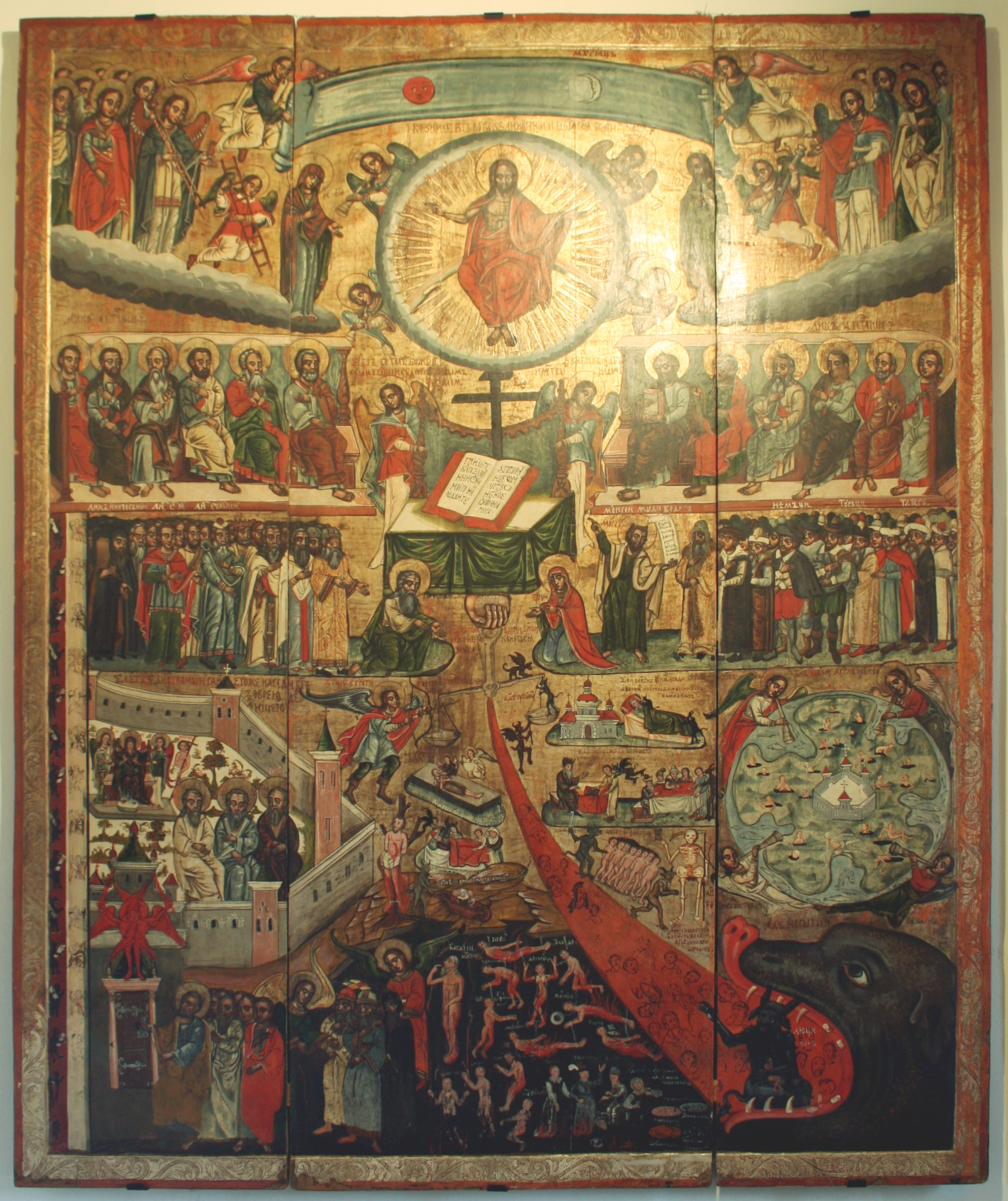
The Last Judgment, 17th century icon from Lipie. Historic Museum in Sanok, Poland.

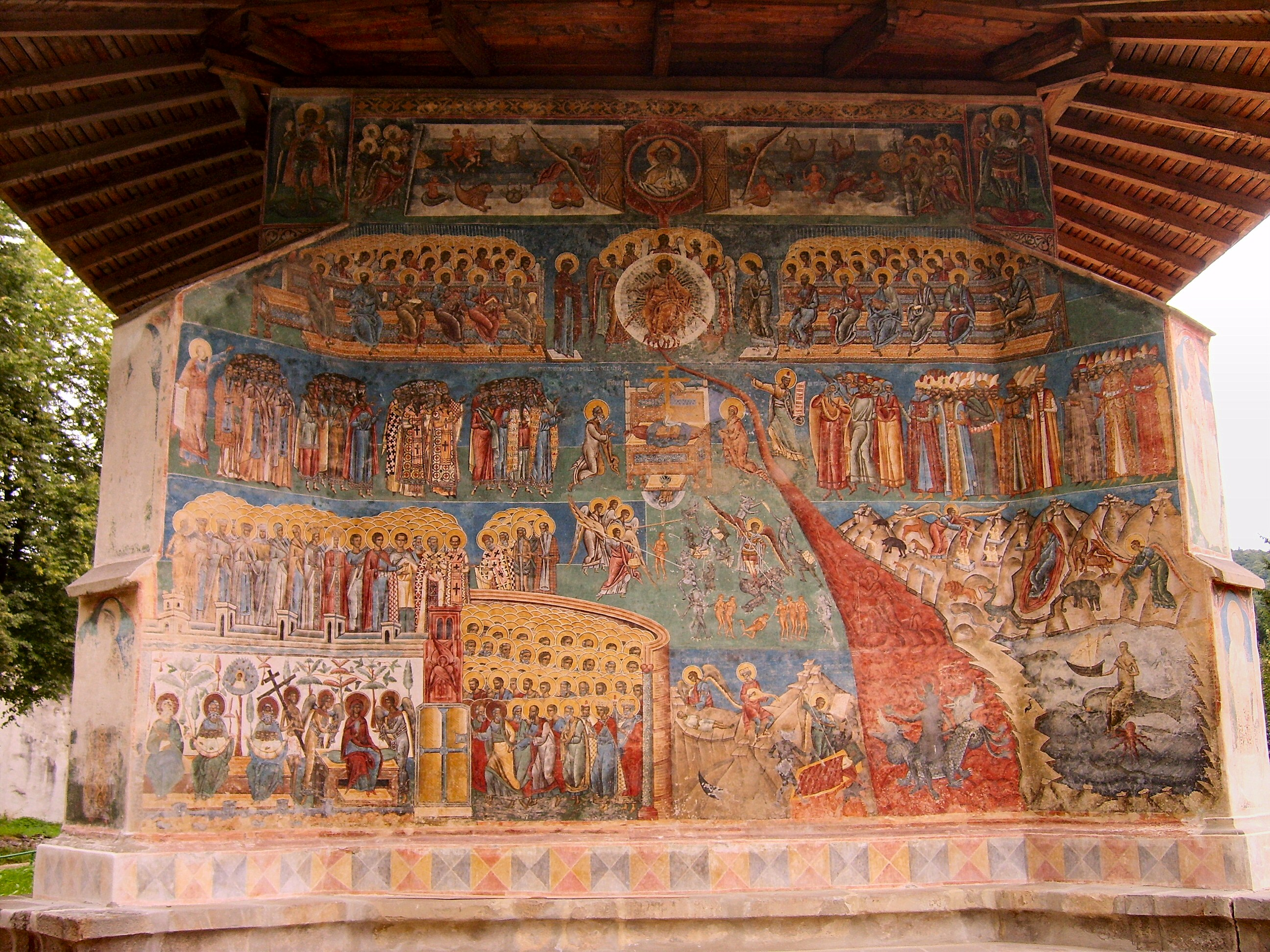
The Last Judgment, mural from Voroneț Monastery, Romania

The Eastern Orthodox Church teaches that there are two judgments: the first, or particular judgment, is that experienced by each individual at the time of his or her death, at which time God will decide where one is to spend the time until the Second Coming of Christ (see Hades in Christianity). This judgment is generally believed to occur on the fortieth day after death. The second, General or Final Judgment will occur after the Second Coming.

Although in modern times some have attempted to introduce the concept of soul sleep into Orthodox thought about life after death, it has never been a part of traditional Orthodox teaching, and it contradicts the Orthodox understanding of the intercession of the Saints.

Eastern Orthodoxy teaches that salvation is bestowed by God as a free gift of divine grace, which cannot be earned, and by which forgiveness of sins is available to all. However, the deeds done by each person are believed to affect how he will be judged, following the Parable of the Sheep and the Goats. How forgiveness is to be balanced against behavior is not well-defined in scripture, judgment in the matter being solely Christ's.

Similarly, although Orthodoxy teaches that sole salvation is obtained only through Christ and his Church, the fate of those outside the Church at the Last Judgment is left to the mercy of God and is not declared.

===== Icons =====
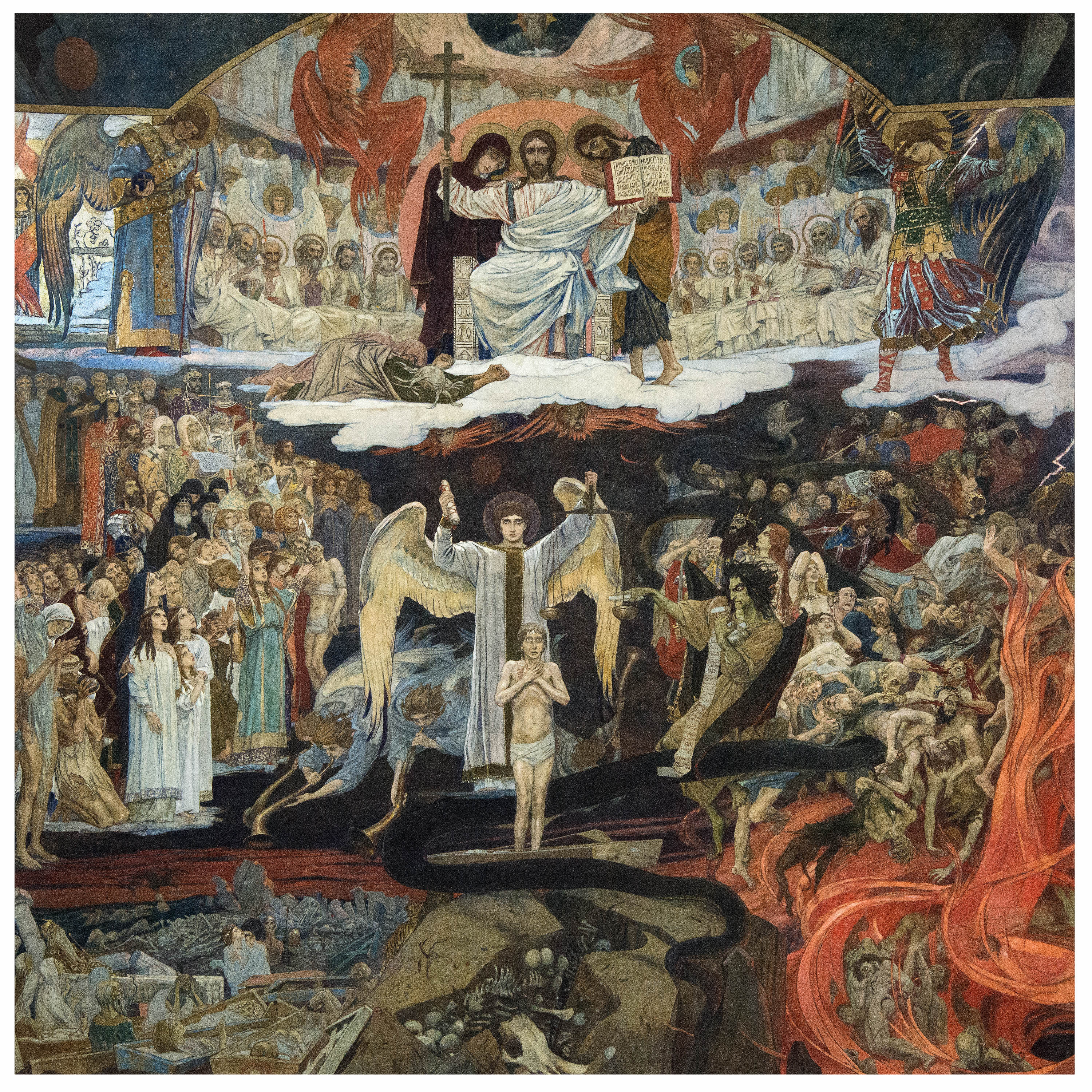
Viktor Vasnetsov's The Last Judgment, 1904

The theme of the Last Judgment is important in Orthodoxy. Traditionally, an Orthodox church will have a fresco or mosaic of the Last Judgment on the back (western) wall so that the faithful, as they leave the services, are reminded that they will be judged by what they do during earthly life.

The icon of the Last Judgment traditionally depicts Christ Pantokrator, enthroned in glory on a white throne, surrounded by the Theotokos (Virgin Mary), John the Baptist, the Apostles, saints and angels. Beneath the throne the scene is divided in half with the "mansions of the righteous" (John 14:2), i.e., those who have been saved, to Jesus' right (the viewer's left), and the torments of those who have been damned to his left. Separating the two is the river of fire which proceeds from Jesus' left foot. For more detail, see below.

===== Hymnography =====
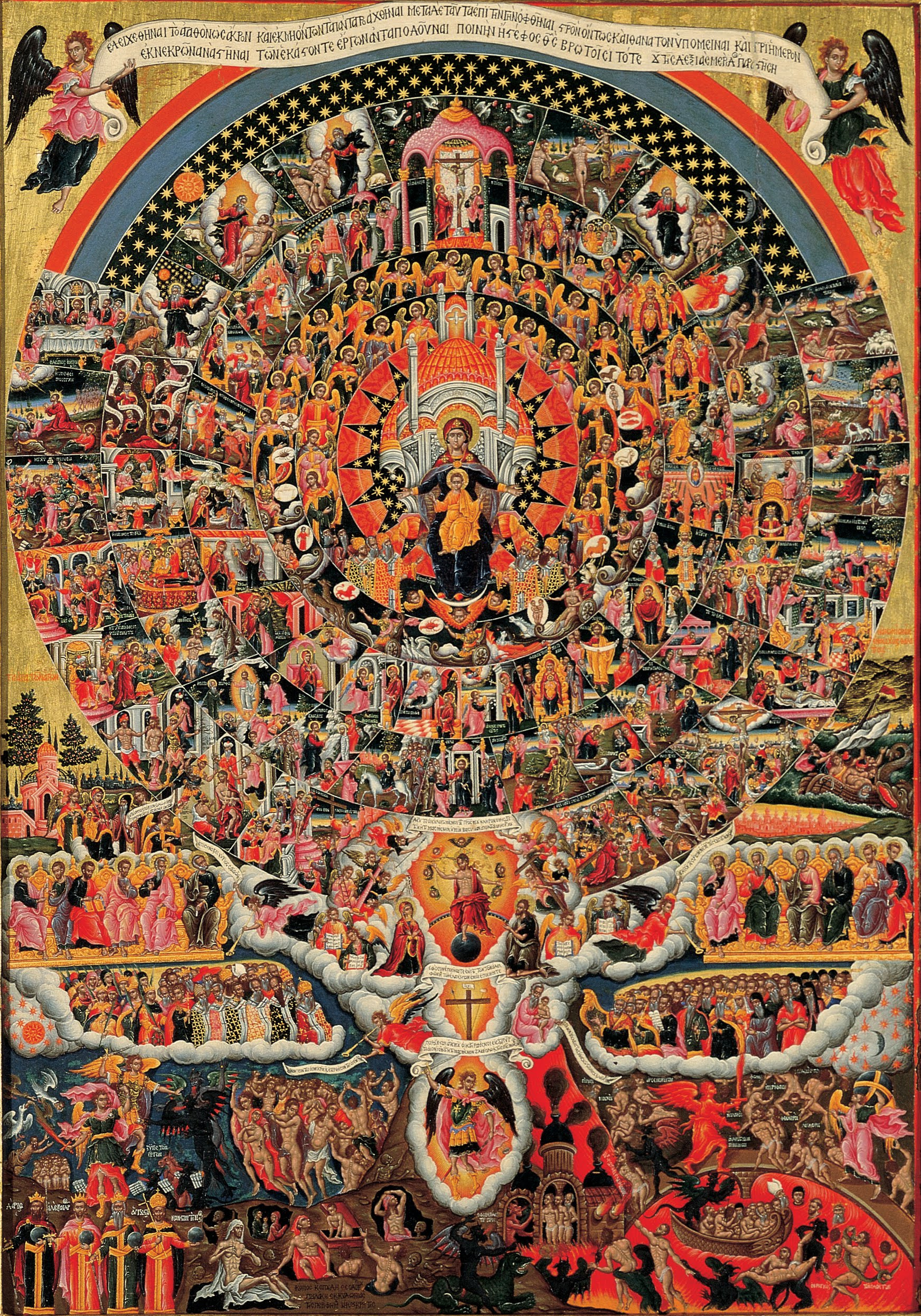
Theodore Poulakis The Hymn to the Virgin with Last Judgment, 1622

The theme of the Last Judgement is found in the funeral and memorial hymnody of the Church, and is a major theme in the services during Great Lent. The second Sunday before the beginning of Great Lent is dedicated to the Last Judgement. It is also found in the hymns of the Octoechos used on Saturdays throughout the year.

==== Cretan School ====
There were many renditions of the Last Judgment completed by Greek painters living in Crete which was held by the Venetian Empire. Most of the works of art were influenced by Venetian painting but were considered to be painted in the Maniera Greca.

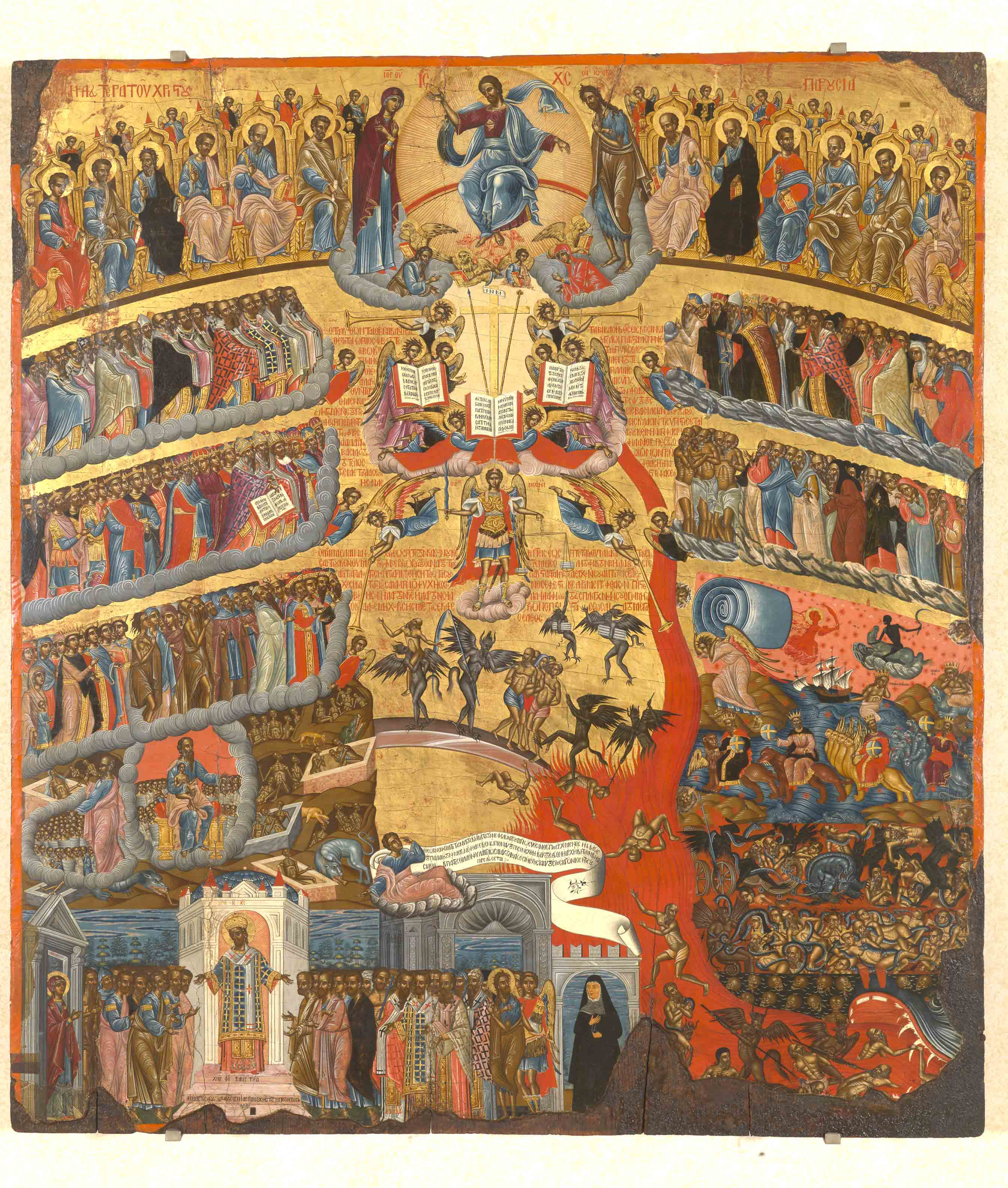
The Last Judgment by Francheskos Kavertzas, 1648

Georgios Klontzas painted many triptychs featuring the Last Judgment some include The Last Judgment, The Last Judgement Triptych, and The Triptych of the Last Judgement. Klontzas was the forerunner of a new painting style.

Other Greek painters followed the precedent set by Klontzas. Theodore Poulakis added the last judgment to his rendition of Klontzas' In Thee Rejoiceth. The painter incorporated the Last Judgement into one of Klontzas' earlier works entitled In Thee Rejoiceth. Poulakis paid homage to the father of the Last Judgement style. Leos Moskos and Francheskos Kavertzas also followed the outline for the stylistic representation of the Last Judgement set by Klontzas. Their works were The Last Judgment (Kavertzas) and The Last Judgment (Moskos). Both paintings resemble Klontas' Last Judgement painting.

==== Lutheranism ====
Lutherans do not believe in any sort of earthly millennial kingdom of Christ either before or after his second coming on the last day. On the last day, all the dead will be resurrected. Their souls will then be reunited with the same bodies they had before dying. The bodies will then be changed, those of the wicked to a state of everlasting shame and torment, those of the righteous to an everlasting state of celestial glory. After the resurrection of all the dead, and the change of those still living, all nations shall be gathered before Christ, and he will separate the righteous from the wicked. Christ will publicly judge all people by the testimony of their faith – the good works of the righteous in evidence of their faith, and the evil works of the wicked in evidence of their unbelief. He will judge in righteousness in the presence of all and men and angels, and his final judgment will be just damnation to everlasting punishment for the wicked and a gracious gift of life everlasting to the righteous.

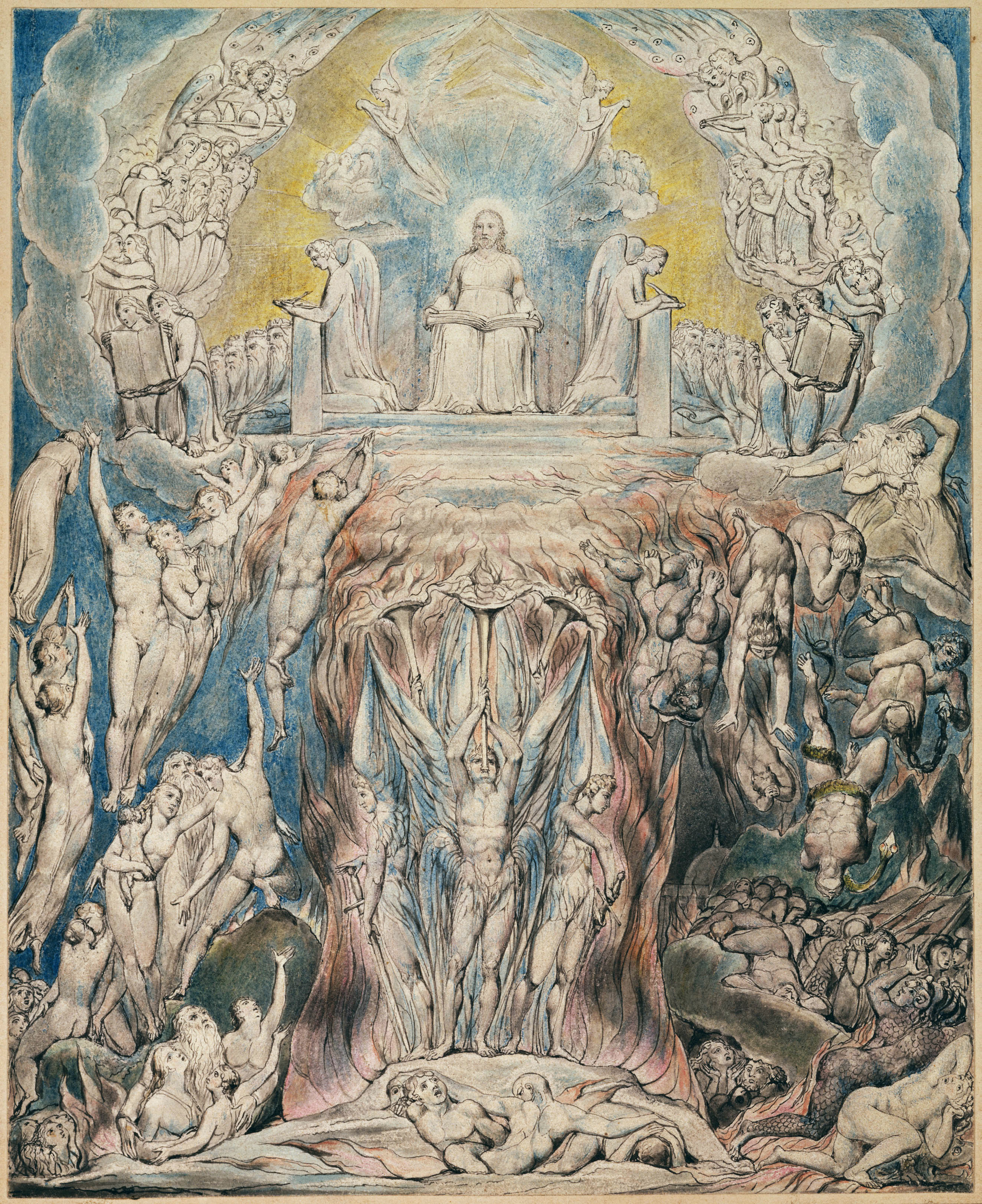
William Blake's The Day of Judgment, printed in 1808 to illustrate Robert Blair's poem "The Grave"

=== Esoteric Christian traditions ===
Although the Last Judgment is believed by a great part of Christian mainstream churches; some members of Esoteric Christian traditions like the Rosicrucians, the Spiritualist movement, and some liberals instead believe in a form of universal salvation.

Max Heindel, a Danish-American astrologer and mystic, taught that when the Day of Christ comes, marking the end of the current fifth or Aryan epoch, the human race will have to pass a final examination or last judgment, where, as in the Days of Noah, the chosen ones or pioneers, the sheep, will be separated from the goats or stragglers, by being carried forward into the next evolutionary period, inheriting the ethereal conditions of the New Galilee in the making. Nevertheless, it is emphasized that all beings of the human evolution will ultimately be saved in a distant future as they acquire a superior grade of consciousness and altruism. At the present period, the process of human evolution is conducted by means of successive rebirths in the physical world and the salvation is seen as being mentioned in Revelation 3:12 (KJV), which states "Him that overcometh will I make a pillar in the temple of my God and he shall go no more out". However, this western esoteric tradition states – like those who have had a near-death experience – that after the death of the physical body, at the end of each physical lifetime and after the life review period (which occurs before the silver cord is broken), a judgment occurs, more akin to a Final Review or End Report over one's life, where the life of the subject is fully evaluated and scrutinized. This judgment is seen as being mentioned in Hebrews 9:27, which states that "it is appointed unto men once to die, but after this the judgment".

=== Swedenborgian ===
Emanuel Swedenborg (1688–1772) had a revelation that the church has gone through a series of Last Judgments. First, during Noah's Flood, then Moses on Mount Sinai, Jesus' crucifixion, and finally in 1757, which is the final Last Judgment. These occur in a realm outside earth and heaven, and are spiritual in nature.

=== The Church of Jesus Christ of Latter-day Saints ===
The Church of Jesus Christ of Latter-day Saints (LDS Church) teaches that the last judgment for each individual occurs after that individual has been resurrected. People will be judged by Jesus Christ. Jesus' twelve apostles will help judge the twelve tribes of Israel and the twelve Nephite disciples from the Book of Mormon will help to judge the Nephite and Lamanite people.

The Church of Jesus Christ of Latter-day Saints teaches that people will be judged by their words, their works, their thoughts, and the intents of their hearts. Records that have been kept in heaven and on earth will also be used to judge people. Jesus Christ will act as the advocate for people who had faith in him and such people will enter God's presence based on Jesus' merits as opposed to their own.

After the final judgment, an individual is assigned to one of the three degrees of glory.

=== Artistic representations ===
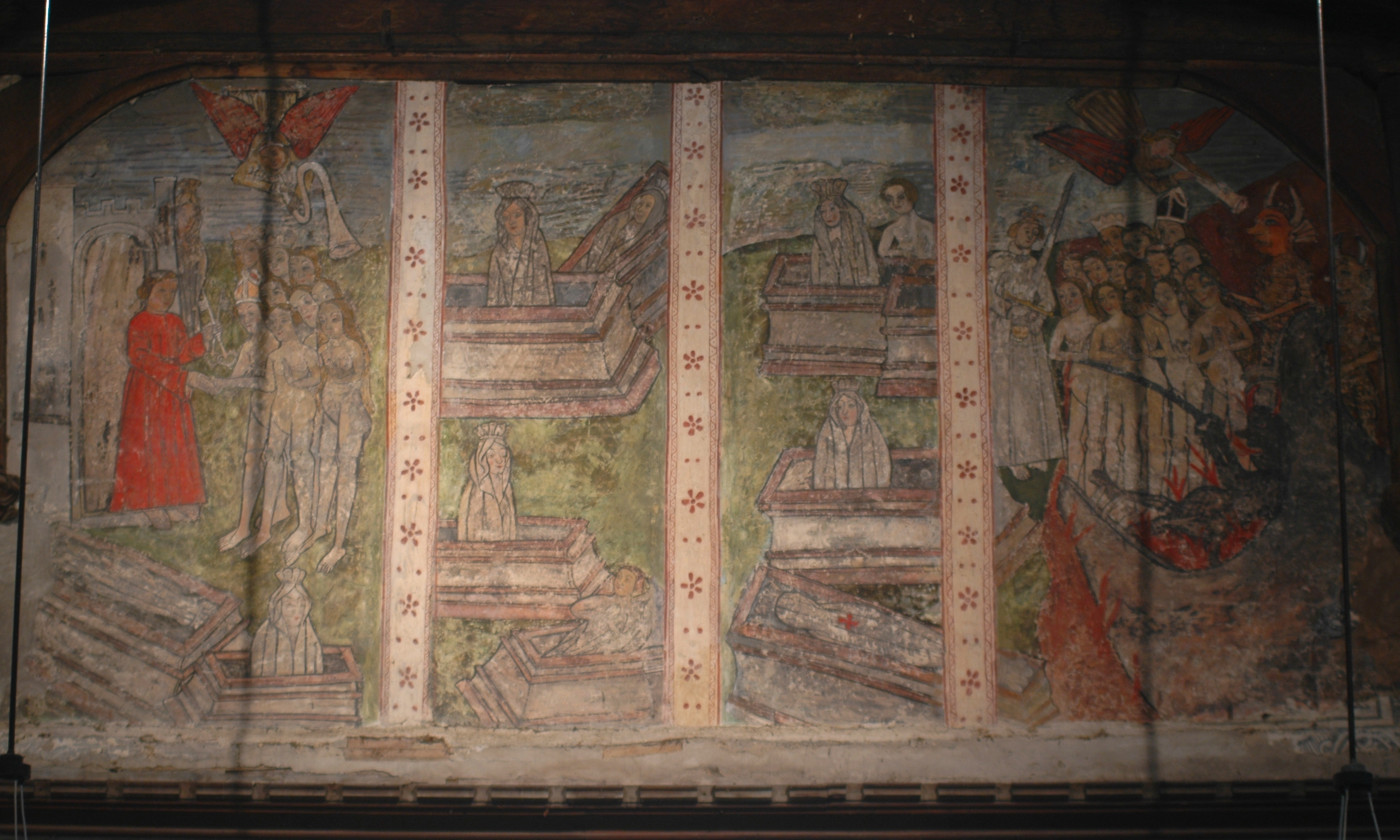
Doom painting, St Mary's Church, North Leigh, Oxfordshire, 15th century

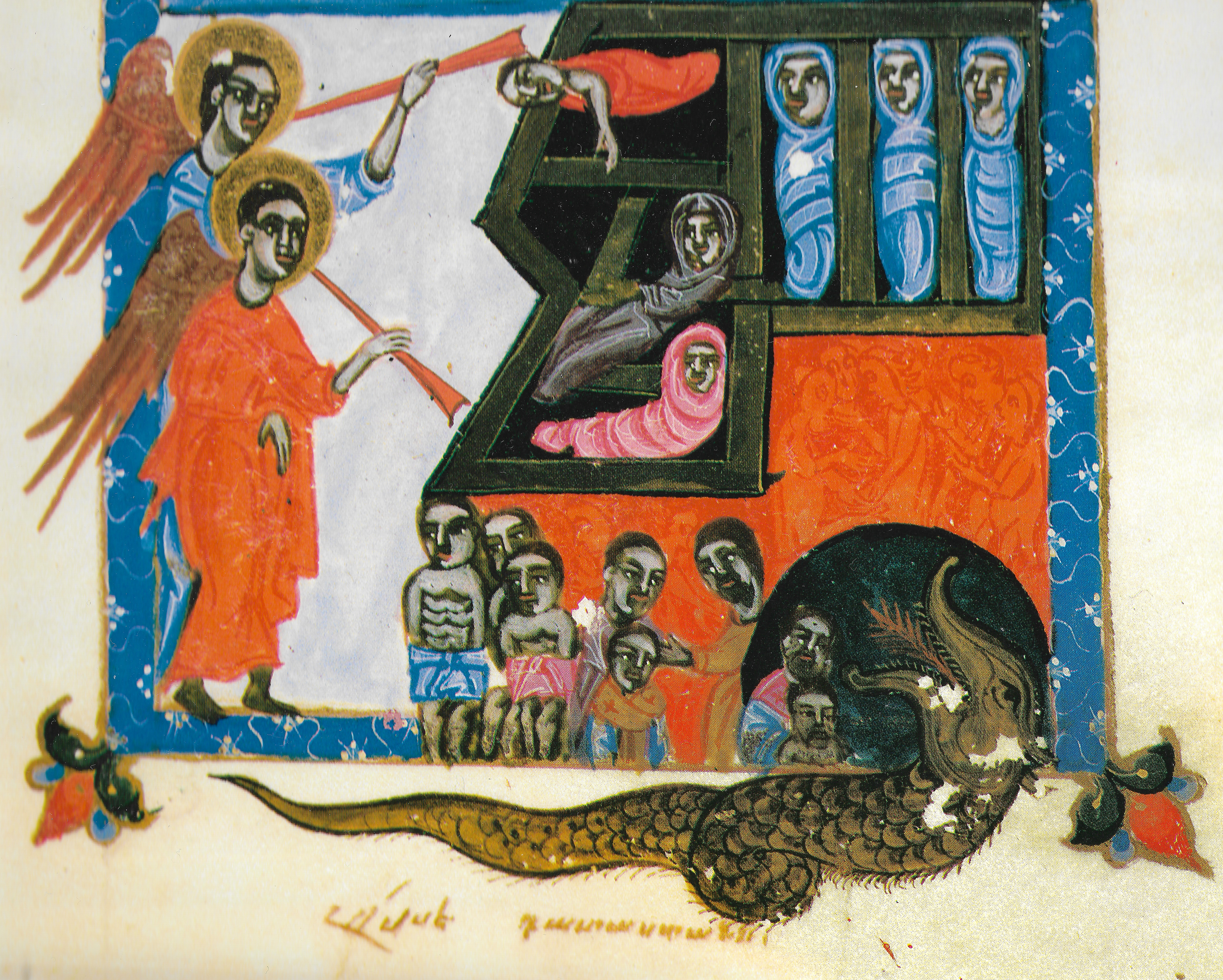
Armenian manuscript depicts the Last Judgment, 1679.

In art, the Last Judgment is a common theme in medieval and renaissance religious iconography. Like most early iconographic innovations, its origins stem from Byzantine art, although it was a less common subject than in the West during the Middle Ages. In Western Christianity, it is often the subject depicted in medieval cathedrals and churches, either outside on the central tympanum of the entrance or inside on the (rear) west wall, so that the congregation attending church saw the image on either entering or leaving.

In the 15th century it also appeared as the central section of a triptych on altarpieces, with the side panels showing heaven and hell, as in the Beaune Altarpiece or a triptych by Hans Memling. The usual composition has Christ seated high in the centre, flanked by angels, the Virgin Mary, and John the Evangelist who are supplicating on behalf of those being judged (in what is called a Deesis group in Orthodoxy). Saint Michael is often shown, either weighing the deceased on scales or directing matters, and there might be a large crowd of saints, angels, and the saved around the central group.

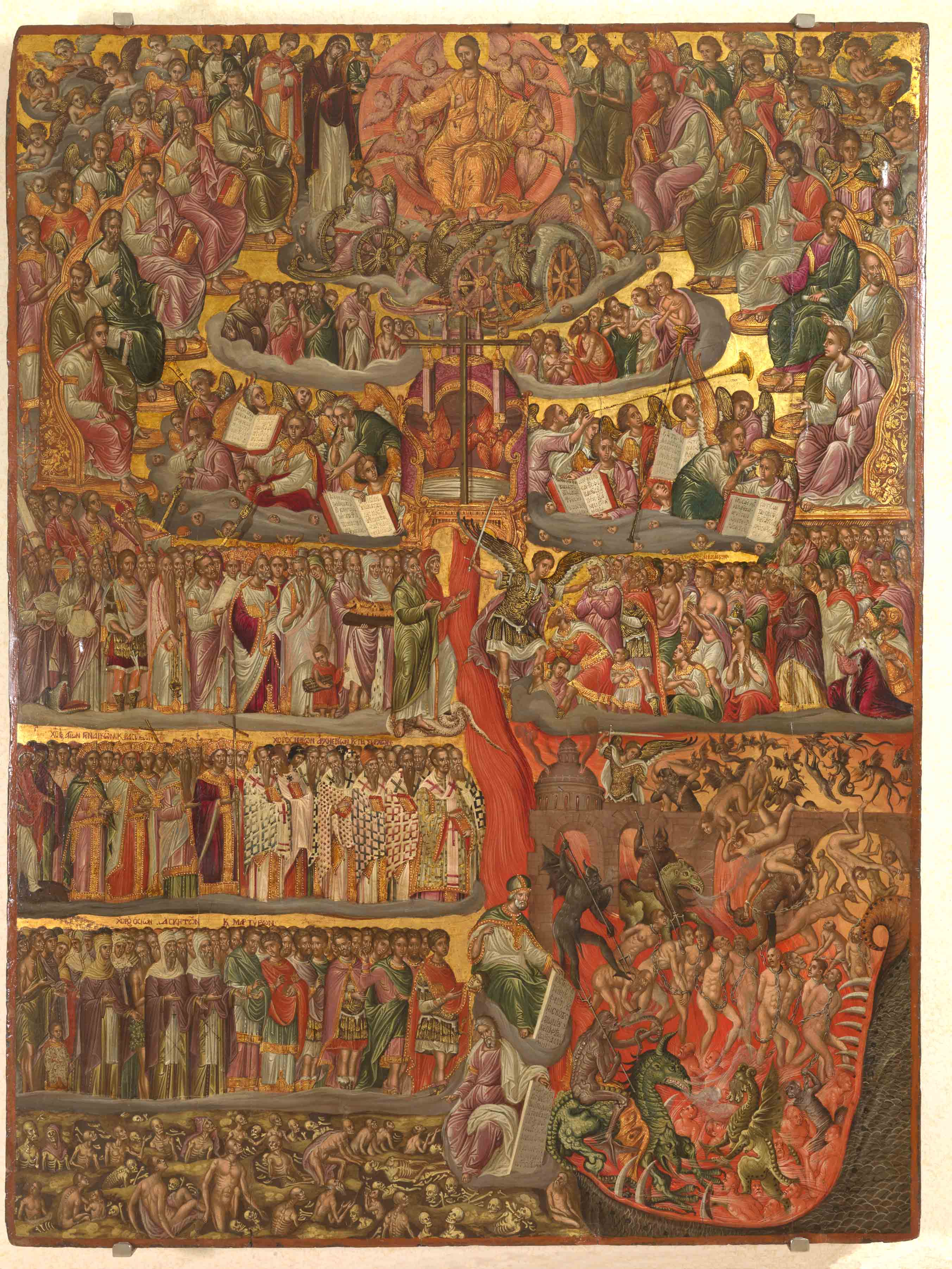
The Last Judgment by Georgios Klontzas late 1500s

At the bottom of the composition a crowd of the deceased are shown, often with some rising from their graves. These are being sorted and directed by angels into the saved and the damned. Almost always the saved are on the viewer's left (so on the right hand of Christ), and the damned on the right. The saved are led up to heaven, often shown as a fortified gateway, while the damned are handed over to devils who herd them down into hell on the right; the composition therefore has a circular pattern of movement. Often the damned disappear into a Hellmouth, the mouth of a huge monster, an image of Anglo-Saxon origin. The damned often include figures of high rank, wearing crowns, mitres, and often the Papal tiara during the lengthy periods when there were antipopes, or in Protestant depictions. There may be detailed depictions of the torments of the damned.

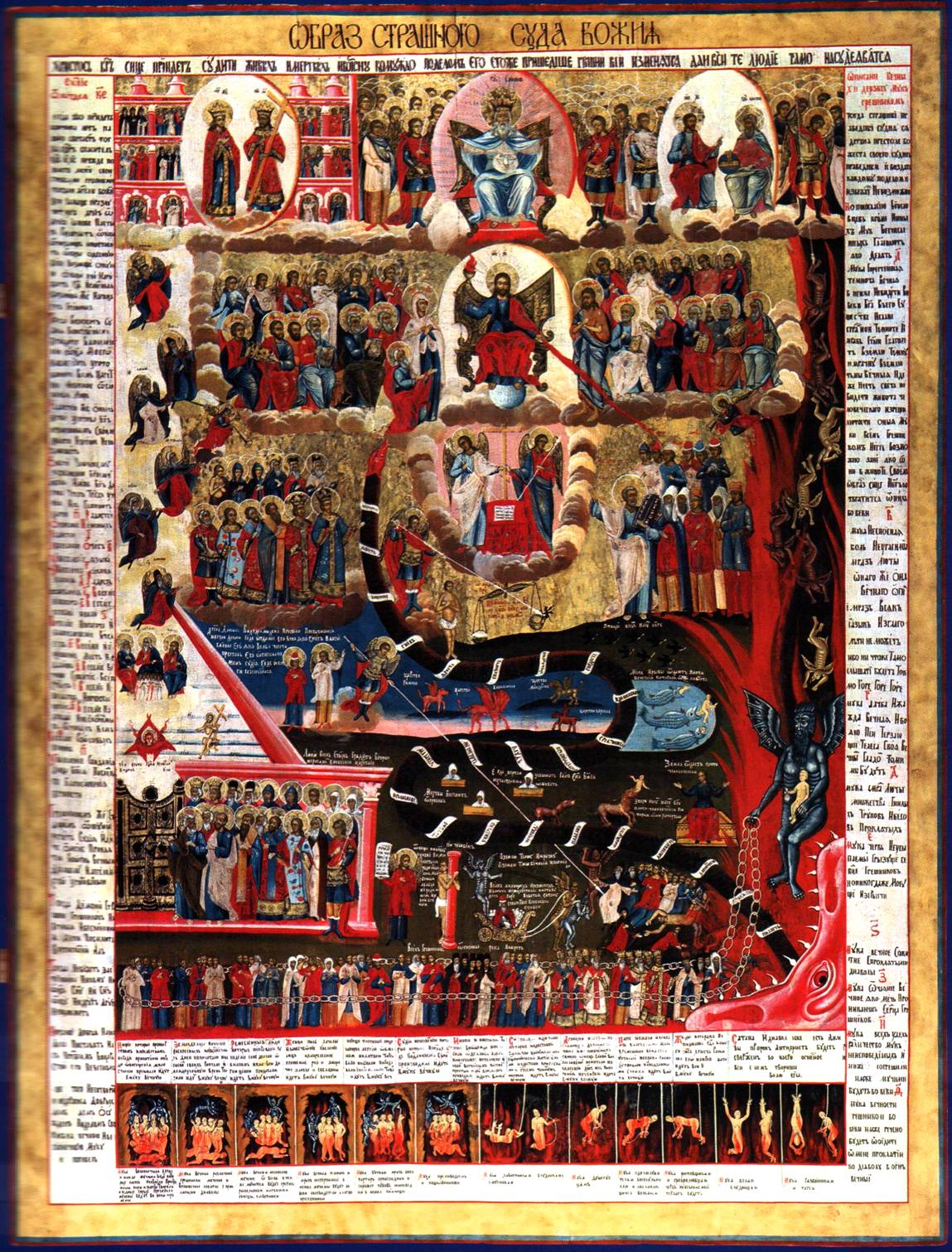
Last Judgment (Russia, 18th century)

The most famous Renaissance depiction is Michelangelo Buonarroti's The Last Judgment in the Sistine Chapel. Included in this fresco is his self-portrait, as St. Bartholomew's flayed skin.

The image in Eastern Orthodox icons has a similar composition, but usually less space is devoted to hell, and there are often a larger number of scenes; the Orthodox readiness to label figures with inscriptions often allows more complex compositions. There is more often a large group of saints around Christ (which may include animals), and the hetoimasia or "empty throne", containing a cross, is usually shown below Christ, often guarded by archangels; figures representing Adam and Eve may kneel below it or below Christ. A distinctive feature of the Orthodox composition, especially in Russian icons, is a large band leading like a chute from the feet of Christ down to hell; this may resemble a striped snake or be a "river of Fire" coloured flame red. If it is shown as a snake, it attempts to bite Adam on the heel but, as he is protected by Christ, is unsuccessful.

== In Islam ==
Diagram of "Plain of Assembly" (Ard al-Hashr) on the Day of Judgment, from an autograph manuscript of Futuhat al-Makkiyya by Sufi mystic and Muslim philosopher Ibn Arabi, c. 1238. Shown are the 'Arsh (Throne of God), pulpits for the righteous (al-Aminun), seven rows of angels, Gabriel (al-Ruh), A'raf (the Barrier), the Pond of Abundance, al-Maqam al-Mahmud (the Praiseworthy Station; where Muhammad will stand to intercede for the faithful), Mizan (the Scale), As-Sirāt (the Bridge), Jahannam (Hell), and Marj al-Jannat (Meadow of Paradise).

Belief in Judgment Day (Arabic: یوم القيامة, romanized: Yawm al-qiyāmah, lit. 'Day of Resurrection' or Arabic: یوم الدین, romanized: Yawm ad-din, lit. 'Day of Judgement') is considered a fundamental tenet of faith by all Muslims. It is one of the six articles of faith. The trials and tribulations associated with it are detailed in both the Quran and the hadith, (sayings of Muhammad), from whence they are elaborated on in the creeds, Quranic commentaries (tafsịrs), and theological writing, eschatological manuals, whose authors include al-Ghazali, Ibn Kathir, Ibn Majah, Muhammad al-Bukhari, and Ibn Khuzaymah.

=== Similarities to the Judgement Day of Christianity ===
Like Christianity, Islamic eschatology has a time of tribulation preceding Judgement Day where strange and terrible events will serve as portents; there will be a second coming of Jesus (but in different roles); battles with an AntiChrist (Al-Masīḥ ad-Dajjāl, literally "Deceitful Messiah") and struggles with Gog and Magog; and a Rapture-like removal of all righteous believers before the end. A "Day of Resurrection" of the dead (yawm al-qiyāmah), will be announced by a trumpet blast. Resurrection will be followed by a "Day of Judgment" (yawm ad-din) where all human beings who have ever lived will be held accountable for their deeds by being judged by God. Depending on the verdict of the judgement, they will be sent for eternity to either the reward of paradise (Jannah) or the punishment of hell (Jahannam).

=== Salvation and damnation ===
In this process, the souls will traverse over hellfire via the bridge of sirat. For sinners, the bridge will be thinner than hair and sharper than the sharpest sword, impossible to walk on without falling below to arrive at their fiery destination, while the righteous will proceed across the bridge to paradise (Jannah).

Not everyone consigned to hell will remain there. Somewhat like the Catholic concept of purgatory, sinful Muslims will stay in hell until purified of their sins. According to the scholar Al-Subki (and others), "God will take out of the Fire everyone who has said the testimony" (i.e. the shāhada testimony made by all Muslims, "There is no deity but The God") "and none will remain to save those who rejected or worshipped other than God."

Literal or figurative interpretation

While early Muslims debated whether scripture on Judgement day should be interpreted literally or figuratively, the school of thought that prevailed (Ashʿarī) "affirmed that such things as the individual records of deeds (including the paper, pen, and ink with which they are inscribed), the bridge, the balance, and the pond are realities to be understood in a concrete and literal sense."

== In Jainism ==
In Jainism, there is no day of judgement as such. Jains believe, however, that as the 5th era comes to an end, evil will increase and the religion and good will decrease. Only four Jains will remain in the world: a monk, a female monk, a shravak and a shravika. A deity from the heavens will descend upon the earth and gather them, and ask them to take "Anshan", or vow to fast (without any food or water) until death.

== In Yarsanism ==
In Yarsanism is a belief that people reincarnate until the Day of Resurrection when the last reincarnation occurs and pious people will be separated from sinful. God will forgive sins of pious souls and they will be rewarded with two paradises to which they will be sent according to what they look for. If they look for worldly pleasures, they will be sent to a mortal paradise, where they will perish one day. If they look for the mystical joy, then they will be sent to the immortal paradise, where they will live in the presence of God. Sinners will go to hell.

== Crack of doom ==
In English, crack of doom is an old term used for the Day of Judgment, referring in particular to the blast of trumpets signalling the end of the world in Chapter 8 of the Book of Revelation. A "crack" had the sense of any loud noise, preserved in the phrase "crack of thunder", and "doom" was a term for the Last Judgment, as Eschatology still is.

The phrase is famously used by William Shakespeare in Macbeth, where on the heath the Three Witches show Macbeth the line of kings that will issue from Banquo:

"Why do you show me this? A fourth! Start, eyes!
What, will the line stretch out to the crack of doom?
Another yet! A seventh! I'll see no more." (Act 4, scene 1, 112–117)

The meaning was that Banquo's line will endure until the Judgment Day, flattery for King James I, who claimed descent from Banquo.

== Music ==
- Marc-Antoine Charpentier, Extremum Dei Judicium H.401, Oratorio for soloists, chorus, 2 treble instruments, and bc. (1680)
- Giacomo Carissimi, Extremum Dei Judicium, for 3 chorus, 2 violins and organ.
- Tomoya Ohtani, Last Judgment from Sonic Forces Original Soundtrack: A Hero Will Rise.

== See also ==
- Apocatastasis
- Atonement in Christianity
- Immanent evaluation, a concept Gilles Deleuze contrasts with transcendent judgment
- Kingdom of God (Christianity)
- List of dates predicted for apocalyptic events
- New Jerusalem
- New World Order (conspiracy)
- Plan of salvation (Latter Day Saints) Mormon view
- Problem of evil
- Ragnarök
- Yom Kippur

== Bibliography ==
- Hatzidakis, Manolis; Drakopoulou, Evgenia (1997). Έλληνες Ζωγράφοι μετά την Άλωση (1450-1830). Τόμος 2: Καβαλλάρος - Ψαθόπουλος [Greek Painters after the Fall of Constantinople (1450-1830). Volume 2: Kavallaros - Psathopoulos]. Athens: Center for Modern Greek Studies, National Research Foundation. hdl:10442/14088. ISBN 960-7916-00-X.
- Siopis, Ioannis (2016). Το θέμα της Δευτέρας Παρουσίας στις Εικόνες [A Detailed History of the Second Coming (Last Judgment) in Greek Paintings (Greek)] (PDF). Thessaloniki, Greece: Aristotle University of Thessaloniki School of Philosophy Division of Archaeology and History.
