= General judgment =

Christian theological concept

General judgment is the Christian theological concept of a judgment of the dead. When the individual dies, general judgment holds that the person's final dispensation will await the general judgment of the dead at the end of the world, rather than be judged immediately. It is generally contrasted with a particular judgment right after death. It is related closely to Judgment Day and often is just another phrase for the Last Judgment or Final Judgement.

== In the Bible ==
Jesus provided examples and illustrations of judgments against cities and generations. Jesus warned his contemporaries that the men of Nineveh, who repented at the preaching of Jonah, and the Queen of the South would testify against them in the judgment. In the same speech, Jesus declared woes upon the cities of Chorazin and Bethsaida declaring that the cities of Sodom, Tyre, and Sidon would have a more tolerable outcome in the judgement.

== Catholic view ==
The position is hinted at in several places in both the Old and in the New Testament, and the Catholic Encyclopedia says (here referring to the Last Judgment) "Few truths are more often or more clearly proclaimed in Scripture than that of the general judgment".

After death, a person immediately faces their particular judgment, and goes "to" the states of heaven, purgatory or hell, depending on their justification, their state of grace. At the resurrection, all humans will face general judgment, where their lives will be exposed:

"the Last Judgment will reveal that God's justice triumphs over all the injustices committed by his creatures and that God's love is stronger than death."

— Catechism of Catholic Church

Catholics have traditionally believed that there will be different rewards in heaven (such as an increased capacity for the beatific vision) depending on, for example, whether corporal works of mercy were practiced during a lifetime or not. They rate as important acts of charity. Therefore, and according to the biblical sources (Matthew 5:31-46), the conjunction of the Last Judgment and the works of mercy is very frequent in the pictorial tradition of Christian art.

== See also ==
- Divine judgment
- Judgement (afterlife)
- Pre-advent judgment
