= Anne Wentworth =

Anne Wentworth may refer to:

- Anne Blunt, 15th Baroness Wentworth (1837–1917), British musician and horse breeder
- Anne Wentworth, Countess of Strafford (c. 1672–1739), British peer and diplomat
- Anne Byron, 11th Baroness Wentworth (1792–1860), English mathematician and the wife of George Gordon Byron
- Anne Wentworth (prophetess), 17th century English prophetess and writer
- Anne Wentworth (16th-century visionary)

== See also ==
- Anne Elliot
