= Our Lady of Ipswich =

Marian shrine in Ipswich, England, until 1538

Coordinates: 52.0591°N 1.1494°E

Our Lady of Ipswich (also known as Our Lady of Grace) was a Marian shrine in Ipswich before the English Reformation. Among Marian shrines, only the shrine at Walsingham attracted more visitors.

== Background ==
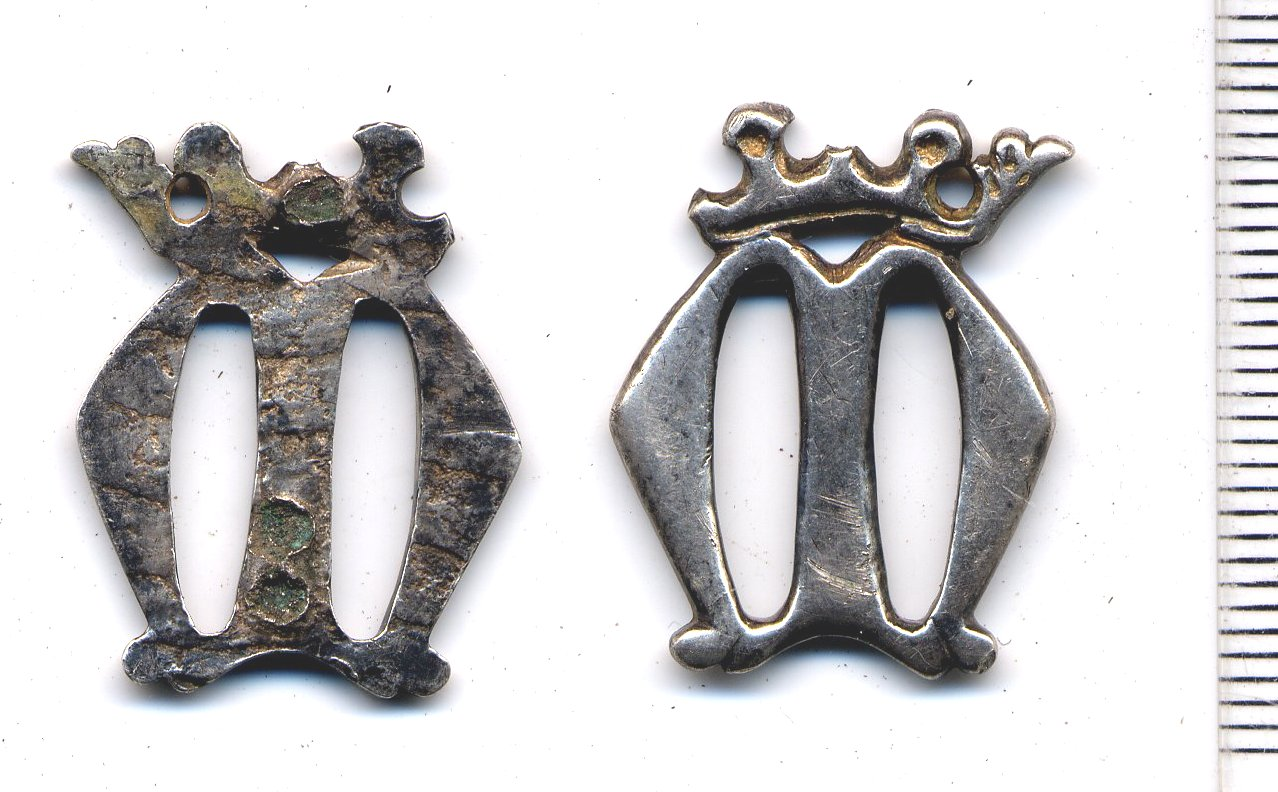
Tudor English pilgrim badge with "M" for Mary

For centuries, England has been known as 'Our Lady's Dowry'. Anglo-Saxon England sheltered many shrines to the Virgin Mary: shrines were dedicated to her at Glastonbury in 540, Evesham in 702, Tewkesbury in 715, Canterbury in 866, Willesden in 939, Abingdon before 955, Ely in 1020, Coventry in 1043, York in 1050, and Walsingham in 1061. By the High Middle Ages there were sixteen shrines to Mary in Suffolk alone.

About half of the medieval churches in Suffolk were dedicated to St Mary under a particular title or devotion. Churches not dedicated to Mary, would have contained a Marian shrine, generally at the east end of the south aisle. Some shrines became so popular that they were translated to buildings of their own. This may be how the shrine of Our Lady of Grace came to be. During the High Middle Ages, the shrine of Our Lady of Grace was second only to that of Our Lady of Walsingham.

== History ==
The medieval town of Ipswich was a busy maritime centre of trade and shipbuilding. The inns and taverns of the town were full of pilgrims. The shrine to Our Lady of Grace at Ipswich is first recorded in 1152.

The shrine of Our Lady of Grace in Lady Lane was just outside the west gate of the medieval town wall of Ipswich, on Lady Lane near St Mary at the Elms Church. The site is marked by a plaque and a statue of Our Lady.

In 1297 the daughter of Edward I, Princess Elizabeth, married the Count of Holland at the shrine.

Among surviving mentions, it is recorded that Sir John Howard paid a visit in August 1463, when his main residence was at Stoke-by-Nayland. On that occasion he apparently left an offering of 2d. At a visit on 5 May, the now Lord Howard spent a total of 10s on a pilgrimage to the shrine. At a visit on 22 January 1472 he left 10d. John Howard was of royal descent and at least by 1470 a wealthy man, a grandson of Thomas de Mowbray, 1st Duke of Norfolk. Howard had shown himself a close friend and loyal supporter of the King Richard III. It was, therefore, now as the new Duke of Norfolk that Howard visited the shrine again, on 16 August 1483, leaving an offering of 20d, then 4d "to bow on Owr Ladys fote" (presumably a particular offering on kissing the foot of the statue) and also 11d "in almes at Owr Lady of Grace". Howard was to die with his royal patron at the Battle of Bosworth Field on 22 August 1485.

After the Tudor dynasty had consolidated its hold on the English throne, Henry VII's queen, Elizabeth of York, made a donation in 1502 of half a golden angel (3s 4d) to the shrine. Between 1517 and 1522, Henry VIII and Queen Catherine of Aragon paid separate visits to the shrine, as did Sir Thomas More and Cardinal Thomas Wolsey, who was born in Ipswich.

== The Maid of Ipswich ==
The image of the Virgin at Ipswich became celebrated on account of a miraculous power of healing attributed to Our Lady of Grace in the early 16th century. The miracle at the shrine of Our Lady of Ipswich is recorded by Sir Thomas More in his book The Supplication of Souls, and he claimed he had news of it from a direct witness. The miracle was bestowed on Anne Wentworth, the 12-year-old daughter of Sir Roger Wentworth, a friend of More's. Anne suffered from seizures in which she spasmed, blasphemed and was said to be able to utter prophesy "vexed and tourmented by our gostly enemye the devyll". After a vision in which she beheld the image of Our Lady of Grace at Ipswich, she was taken to the shrine and "layde before the ymage of our Blessyd Lady....grevously tourmented and in face, eyen, loke and countenance so grysely chaunged...that it was a terrible syght to beholde". There in the presence of the whole company, she was restored "perfytely and sodeynly". Anne, in grateful recognition of the miracle, took the veil and became a nun.

== Destruction ==
The shrine was suppressed during the English Reformation, and its statue was taken to Chelsea to be burnt, along with the statue of Our Lady of Walsingham on 20 September 1538. There are no eyewitness accounts of the statue being burnt, although it is documented that the statue arrived at Chelsea. Regarding the image, Thomas Cromwell's steward wrote to him that he had received it, with 'nothing about her but two half shoes of silver'.

Although the shrine was destroyed, mention of it survived in legal deeds as a boundary description until the 18th century.

== The statue in Nettuno ==
A wooden statue of the Madonna and Child displayed in the local church of the Italian seaside town of Nettuno matches various descriptions of the Ipswich statue. The statue is known locally as "Our Lady of Grace" or "The English Lady". Radiocarbon dating places the era when the tree was felled to provide the wood of which the statue is carved at circa 1280 to 1420 with 94% certainty.

There is also evidence in the Nettuno archives that a statue arrived there from Ipswich in 1550. It was classified as being in the English iconic style in 1938 by Martin Gillett, an historian of 13th-century iconography. Although the statue had been altered (a throne had been replaced and the posture of the Christ child had changed), details such as the folds in the material and Christ's position on the right rather than the left knee suggest that the statue came from England.

At the time of the Battle of Anzio during the Second World War, Nettuno's statue was temporarily moved to Rome for safe keeping.

During restoration work on the statue in 1959 an inscription was found on its back with the words IU? ARET GRATIOSUS, a rendition of the Marian phrase, "Thou art gracious". Ipswich was the only Marian shrine in England dedicated to Our Lady of Grace. Even more striking, when Martin Gillett first examined the statue in 1938, it was wearing two half shoes made of English silver, just like those described by Thomas Cromwell's steward 400 years before.

There are two theories as to how the statue may have reached Italy. One theory is that it was sold by an English official (perhaps Cromwell) instead of being burnt. A second version of the story, popular in Nettuno, is that the statue was rescued by English sailors before it could be burnt, and smuggled on board a ship. In the Mediterranean they met a storm and took refuge in Nettuno and they donated the statue. A scientific analysis of a sliver of wood from the base of the statue has been found to have a high salt content – suggesting that it had at some point been in contact with seawater or sea spray.

As part of the Nettuno celebrations, thousands watch as the statue is taken down from high above the altar in the Basilica and, dressed in her finery, is taken in a grand procession through the streets for a week-long stay at the church of St Giovanni. A replica of the statue was presented to Pope Benedict XVI in Rome on 5 May 2010, during the week of the Shrine's feast, beginning the first Sunday of May.

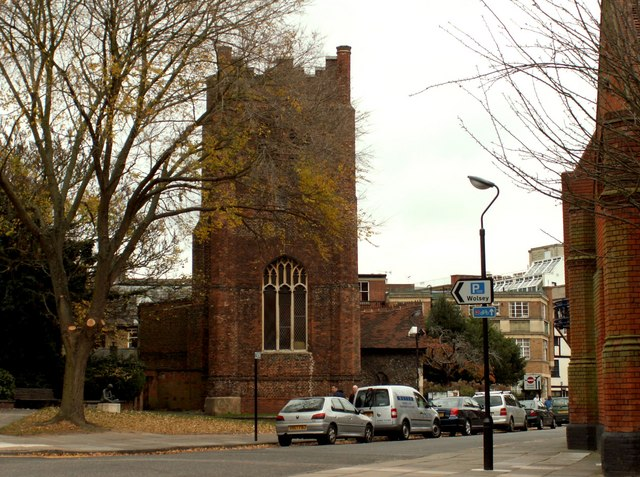
St Mary at the Elms

== Modern devotion ==
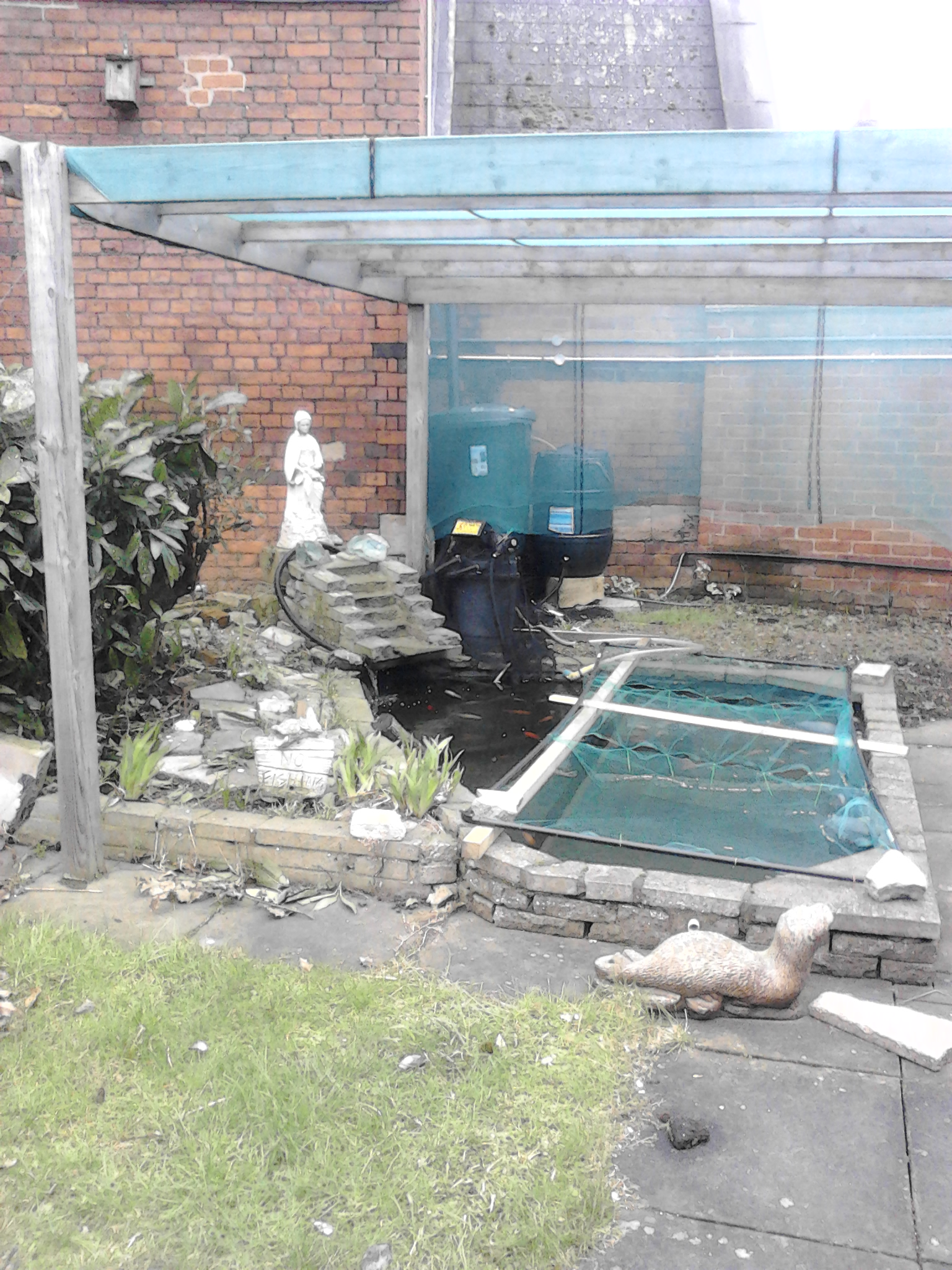
A modern replica of Our Lady of Ipswich at St Pancras Church, Ipswich

A modern shrine is now in the Church of England parish church of St Mary at the Elms, a short distance away from the medieval location.

In 1987, the Guild of Our Lady of Ipswich was founded by people from the Catholic church of St Pancras and the Anglican church of St Mary at the Elms. Their aims have been: to pray for Christian unity and to plan and achieve the re-establishment of the shrine of Our Lady of Grace at Ipswich.

On 10 September 2002 a wooden replica of the Italian statue, carved by sculptor Robert Mellamphy, was blessed and installed by the Anglican Bishop of Richborough in the church of St Mary at the Elms. The ceremony was attended by the Anglican Bishop of St Edmundsbury and Ipswich, the Roman Catholic Dean of Ipswich and representatives of the Eastern Orthodox and Methodist churches.

In 2022 the Catholic parish of St Pancras in Ipswich commissioned the Stuflesser studio in northern Italy to produce a replica of the statue in Nettuno. Carved from linden wood, the new statue stands 120cm tall and is seated on a throne. The Madonna wears a red gown and a blue cloak. On the cloak can be seen two golden stars and on the left sleeve of her cloak is a golden lily. Her right hand holds the Infant Child and in her left hand, the Madonna holds an untasted apple.

== See also ==
- Anglican Marian theology
- Our Lady of Cardigan
- Our Lady of Doncaster
- Our Lady of Walsingham
- Our Lady of Westminster
- Our Lady of Willesden
- Religion in the United Kingdom
- The Books of Homilies
