= Our Lady of Doncaster =

Coordinates: 53.51976°N 1.12590°W

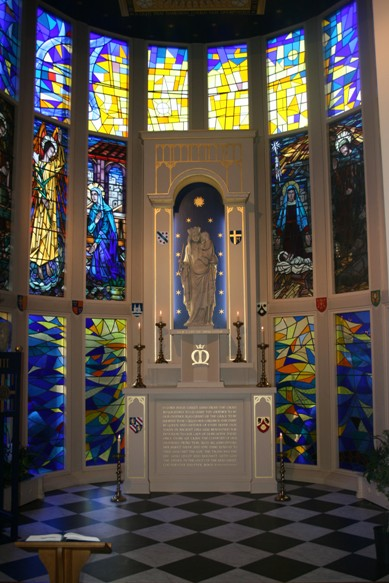
Our Lady of Doncaster, St Peter-in-Chains Church, Doncaster, England

Our Lady of Doncaster is a Marian shrine located in Doncaster, South Yorkshire, England. The original statue in the Carmelite friary was destroyed during the English Reformation. A modern shrine was erected in St Peter-in-Chains Church (or spelt as St Peter in Chains), Doncaster in 1973. The feast day of Our Lady of Doncaster is 4 June.

== Carmelites and the shrine ==
The original Shrine of Our Lady of Doncaster was part of the Carmelite friary in the town during the Middle Ages. The Carmelite friary of Doncaster was founded by John Nicbrother (John Nightbrother of Eyan) in the quarter of the town then known as Hall Gate. Co-founders were Richard le Ewere and, by reason of their patronage, Richard II and his uncle John of Gaunt. On 30 November 1350, licence was granted for alienation in mortmain by, John son of Henry Nicbrothere de Eyoun and Richard le Ewere of Doncastre to the Carmelite Friars of a messuage and six acres of land there, to build a church in honour of St Mary and houses to dwell in.

The Doncaster house became one of importance, due perhaps to its position on the Great North Road. Doncaster afforded a suitable stopping place on the route north from London to Scotland and the Border. Henry VII, in his progress north after his coronation came from Nottingham to Doncaster on a Saturday. The following day he heard Mass before the Lady Shrine. On 13 June 1503, his elder daughter Margaret made her own progress to Scotland, to become Queen of James IV, whom she married two months later. She was met ceremonially on her arrival in Doncaster and lodged at Whitefriars, where she was introduced "according to precedent custom". Other royal visitors to the shrine had included Henry of Bolingbroke (Henry IV), in July 1399, and Edward IV in 1470. In the medieval period the Shrine of Our Lady of Doncaster was the most important Shrine dedicated to Our Lady in Yorkshire.

A provincial chapter of the order was held here in 1376; two of the community were appointed papal chaplains in 1398 and 1402.

== Gifts to the shrine ==
When the young Edward V was brought from Ludlow to London for his intended coronation, his protector, Anthony Woodville, 2nd Earl Rivers, was arrested by the Duke of Gloucester at Northampton and sent to Pontefract Castle. As soon as Gloucester had taken the throne for himself Rivers was executed at Pontefract. Before he died in 1483 he bequeathed the hair-shirt which he always wore in penance to Our Lady of Doncaster.

In 1449, Constance Bigod, widow of Sir John Bigod of Settrington, left her girdle worked with silver and gilt to Our Lady of Doncaster.

Roger de Bankewell was buried close to Our Lady's Shrine, in 1366. Later there were buried here Sir Robert Welles and his wife and, at her own request, in 1484, Margaret Cobham, wife of Ralph Neville, 2nd Earl of Westmorland. Her tomb was of such beauty that it was spared at the Dissolution and was removed to the parish church.

In 1482, Sir Hugh Hastings, then on an expedition against the Scots, thought it prudent to make provision, and left funds to provide wax to be burned during Mass before Our Lady's altar here. But he returned safe, and his Will did not become effective until his death in 1487. In 1506 his daughter-in-law, Katherine, following in the same tradition, left to Our Lady of Doncaster her "tawny chamlett gown". One supposes that the rich material with which it was made was cut up into vestments, with which the statue was arrayed.

The Northumberland Household Book contains the following entry: - "Item: My Lord useth and accustomyth to paye yerly for the fyndynge of a light of wax to birre befor our Ladye in the Whit-Frers of my lordis foundation at Mastyme dayly throwout the yere sett befor our said Ladye there. To be paid to the prior of the said hous for the hole yere for the fyndynge of the said light. To be paid ounes (once a yere, xiii s. iiii d. )"

Alice West of Ripon gave Our Lady of Doncaster "my best bedes".

In time for Princess Margaret Tudor's visit, John Twisilton left a silver gilt crown. And, of interest is the following entry occurring in the Expenses of Henry VIII:- "1517, April. Sir Geoff. Wren, clerk of the closet, for a taper of wax burning before Our Lady of Doncaster, four years, 4 I."

== Miracle of Robert Leche ==
On the eve of the Reformation, in 1524, came a reputed miracle for Robert Leche and his family who were saved from drowning after invocation of Our Lady of Doncaster.

The full text of the story of the saving of Robert and his family is recorded in the Kenyon MSS., issued by the Historical Manuscripts Commission, under the heading of "A curious account of a reputed Miracle". It is one of the most substantial of any such accounts preserved to us from the old Catholic days and the text in question runs thus:

"Be it known to all Christian people that on the 15th day of July, 1524, that as one William Nicholson of Townsburgh (some three miles from Doncaster) should have crossed the river (Don) at a ford at Seaforth Sands with an iron-bound wagon with six oxen and two horses, laden with household stuff, having in the said wayn or wagon one Robert Leche, his wife, two children (one child being half a year of age, the other being under seven years) set his servant Richard Kychyn upon the forward horse; and when past midstream, due to wind and rain, all were driven down stream; the first horse was drowned and the wayn and all was upset, with the wheels upside down.

"Then did the company all call and cry out to Almighty God and Our Blessed Lady, whose image is honoured and worshipped in the White Friars of Doncaster. Each in turn managed to call upon Our Lady and be saved; but Robert Leche's wife, carried three hundred foot and more midstream, and the wagon rolling over and over, and she in it. "All people on land did kneel, and prayed that if ever Our Lady of Doncaster showed miracle, she would show some grace upon this woman. And saved she was; shouted out that she did right well for God, and that Our Lady of Doncaster had saved her. "And that these premises be true and not feigned, William Nicholson, Robert Leche and his wife and children, came to Our Lady of Doncaster upon St Mary Magdalene's Day next after, and did declare this gracious miracle, and it was sworn upon a book before the Prior and Convent with various witnesses named. "And at that day this gracious miracle was rung and sung in the presence of three hundred people and more. Deo Gracias."

== Destruction of the shrine ==
During the Pilgrimage of Grace, the lords used the White Friars as their headquarters while negotiating with Robert Aske at Doncaster. In the aftermath Carmelite Prior Laurence Cook was arrested and imprisoned in the Tower of London. The priory was surrendered by Edward Stubbis, the prior, and seven friars, on 13 November 1538 to Hugh Wyrrall and Tristram Teshe. The King's Commissioners made an inventory of the friary property but Our Lady of Doncaster's statue had already been removed under Archbishop Lee's orders. The property in Doncaster included an inn called 'Le Lyon' in Hallgate, let by the prior to one Alan Malster.

According to Charles Wriothesley, Windsor Herald, who wrote a Chronicle of England during the reigns of the Tudors: - "It was the month of July, the images of Our Lady of Walsingham and Ipswich were brought up to London with all the jewels that hung around them, at the King's commandment, and divers other images, both in England and Wales, that were used for common pilgrimage . . . and they were burnt at Chelsea by my Lord Privy Seal".

Two other chroniclers, Hall and Speed, suggest that the actual burning did not take place until September. The fate of the image of Our Lady of Doncaster is not stated, and beyond the Archbishop's action in seizing it we have no means of knowing what did happen to the statue. A famous letter from Bishop Hugh Latimer to Thomas Cromwell mentions the image by name, referring firstly to the image of Our Lady of Worcester he says:

"She hath been the Devil's instrument, I fear, to bring many to eternal fire; now she herself with her older sister of Walsingham, her younger sister of Ipswich, and their two sisters of Doncaster and Penrhys will make a jolly muster in Smithfield. They would not be all day in burning".

== St Peter-in-Chains Church ==
A Roman Catholic church in Doncaster, St Peter-in-Chains, was dedicated in 1855. A new shrine was established in 1868 after Phyffers of London were commissioned to produce the new statue.

That church featured a remarkable tympanum over the main portal. Charles Hadfield's description of it, in his 1868 Historical Notes, gives a contemporary opinion within a few months of its erection: "The doorway is divided by a shaft of polished granite, which serves as a pedestal for the statue of Our Blessed Lady, carved alto relievo, having Our Lord and Saviour in her arms and on either side standing figures representing St Peter and St Charles Borromeo, patron saints of the church. The background of the design is relieved with drapery and the ensemble is very chaste and effective. It is cut in Roche Abbey stone. A nimbus or halo surrounds the principal figure on which is the following inscription: BENEDICTA ET VENERABILIS ES VIRGO MARIA QUAE SINE TACTU PUDORIS INVENTA ES MATER SALVATORIS."

The revival of devotion to Our Lady of Doncaster has been quiet and unobtrusive. The Marian year of 1954 gave impetus to the revival.

The Bishop of Leeds, the Right Reverend John Carmel Heenan, encouraged the devotion by composing a prayer in honour of our Lady of Doncaster, to which he attached an indulgence.

== Modern times ==
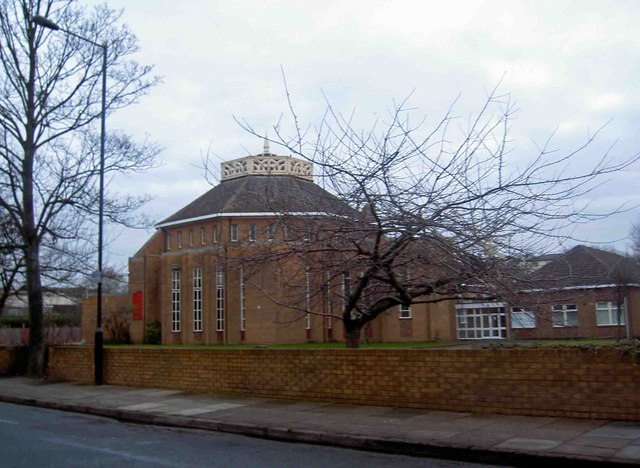
St Peter-in-Chains Church exterior

A new St Peter-in-Chains was opened by Cardinal Heenan on Palm Sunday 1973 and the shrine transferred to the new church. The statue of Our Lady of Doncaster now stands in a circular shrine chapel on the north side of the church. Phyffers' statue stands in an oak reredos with modern stained glass windows depicting Saint Joseph, the Annunciation, the Nativity and the Assumption by Patrick Feeny for Hardman & Co.

The Stations of the Cross, around the perimeter of the garden, each incorporate a fragment of stone from a religious establishment dedicated to Our Lady and destroyed at the time of the Reformation.

The new church is octagonal in shape. John Bentley’s Tabernacle Door, the four reredos panels and the altar designed for the old church are incorporated in the Blessed Sacrament Chapel of the new church.

== See also ==
- Dowry of Mary
- Our Lady of Cardigan
- Our Lady of Ipswich
- Our Lady of Walsingham
- Our Lady of Westminster
- Our Lady of Willesden

== Sources ==
- Shrines of Our Lady in England, Anne Vail, Gracewing Publishing 2004.
