= Our Lady of Grace =

Marian title and Catholic devotion

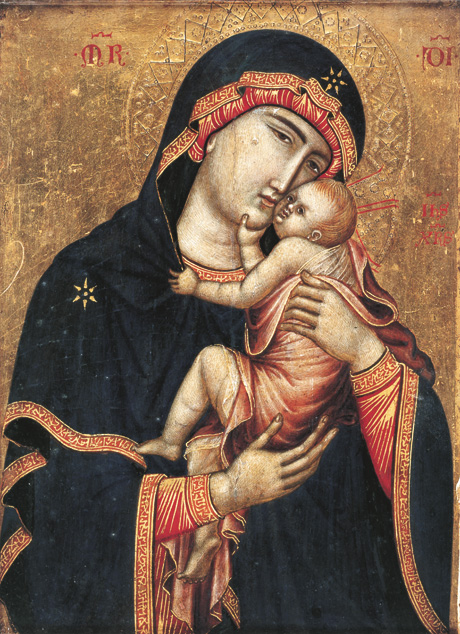
- The Cambrai Madonna, an icon associated with the title Our Lady of Grace

Marian title
- Venerated in: Catholic Church
- Feast: 7 February
- Patronage: Motorcyclists; Tuscany

Our Lady of Grace is a Title of Mary. The feast day associated with this title is February 7. The title of Our Lady of Grace is venerated in many countries throughout the world under various aspects. Many parishes, churches, and schools bear this name.

== History ==
A major shrine in pre-Reformation England was that of "Our Lady of Grace" at Ipswich, also known as "Our Lady of Ipswich". Its first recorded mention is in 1152. In 1297, the marriage of Elizabeth of Rhuddlan, youngest daughter of King Edward I and Eleanor of Castile took place at the Shrine of Our Lady of Grace. During the Middle Ages the Marian Shrine of Our Lady of Grace was a famous pilgrimage destination, and attracted many pilgrims including Henry VIII and Katherine of Aragon. Only Walsingham attracted more pilgrims. At the Reformation the statue was taken away to London to be burned in 1538, though some claim that it survived and is preserved at Nettuno, Italy. Whether it was brought there by Catholic sailors, according to local legend, or simply sold by associates of Thomas Cromwell, the Nettuno statue appears to bear an English provenance. The polychromed wooden statue of Our Lady of Grace is carried in procession every year in Nettuno on the first Saturday of May. The Anglican Church of St Mary at the Elms in Ipswich houses a copy of the Nettuno statue. Every year parishioners from St. Mary's and the Roman Catholic Church of St. Pancras join in a pilgrimage to the former site of the Shrine, which was just outside the city's west gate.

== Images ==
According to Rev. Johann Roten, S.M., the title is of French origin — "Notre Dame de Grâce" in the original — and refers to an icon venerated in Cambrai. It was acquired by Cardinal Jean Allarmet, who gave it to his secretary Fursy de Bruille, a canon of the Cambrai cathedral chapter, in Rome in 1440. De Bruille brought it to Cambrai, and in 1450 presented it to the Old Cambrai Cathedral, where it was installed with great ceremony in the Chapel of the Holy Trinity. It was believed an original by Saint Luke, patron saint of artists, for which Mary herself had sat as model; thus it was treated as a relic, God bestowing blessings on those that travelled to view it. It is carried in an annual procession through the streets of Cambrai on the day before the Assumption (August 15).

Another depiction of Our Lady of Grace is located at the Döbling Carmelite Nunnery in Vienna, where it is also known as "Our Lady of the Bowed Head". An oil painting of the 15th or 16th century, according to legend, it was discovered by a Carmelite friar in a rubbish heap in the Trastevere and miraculously spoke to him while he was attempting to clean it. Restored, it eventually was brought to the court in Munich. Ferdinand II, Holy Roman Emperor attributed his 1620 victory at the Battle of White Mountain to Mary's help.

One image associated with "Our Lady of Grace" is that displayed on the Miraculous Medal. Catherine Labouré, a French member of the Daughters of Charity of Saint Vincent de Paul, reported that in 1830, she experienced a vision of Mary in the convent chapel on the Rue du Bac, in Paris. Labouré said that Mary appeared standing upon a globe with her arms outstretched. As if from rings set with precious stones, dazzling rays of light were emitted from her fingers. When asked why all the rings did not emit light, the apparition responded that these were graces for which people forget to ask. The front of the medal depicts this image.

== Cathedrals ==
- Cathédrale Notre-Dame de Grâce de Cambrai), Cambrai, France
- Our Lady of Grace Cathedral, Belém, Brazil
- Pro-Cathedral of Our Lady of Grace, Praia, Cape Verde
- Our Lady of Grace Cathedral, Nicosia, Cyprus
- Our Lady of Grace Cathedral, Bafatá, Guinea-Bissau
- Our Lady of Grace Cathedral, Setúbal, Portugal
- Our Lady of Grace Cathedral, São Tomé, São Tomé and Príncipe

== Churches ==
- Nuestra Señora de Gracia Church, Makati, Philippines

== Patronage ==
Patron of motorcyclists. Patron of Tuscany.
