= The Books of Homilies =

Two books articulating Anglican doctrine

The Books of Homilies (1547, 1562, and 1571) are two books together containing thirty-three sermons developing the authorized reformed doctrines of the Church of England in depth and detail, as appointed for use in the 35th Article of the Thirty-Nine Articles of Religion. The longer title of the collection is Certain Sermons or Homilies Appointed to Be Read in Churches. They belong to the basic formularies of the Church of England.

== Revision and reform ==
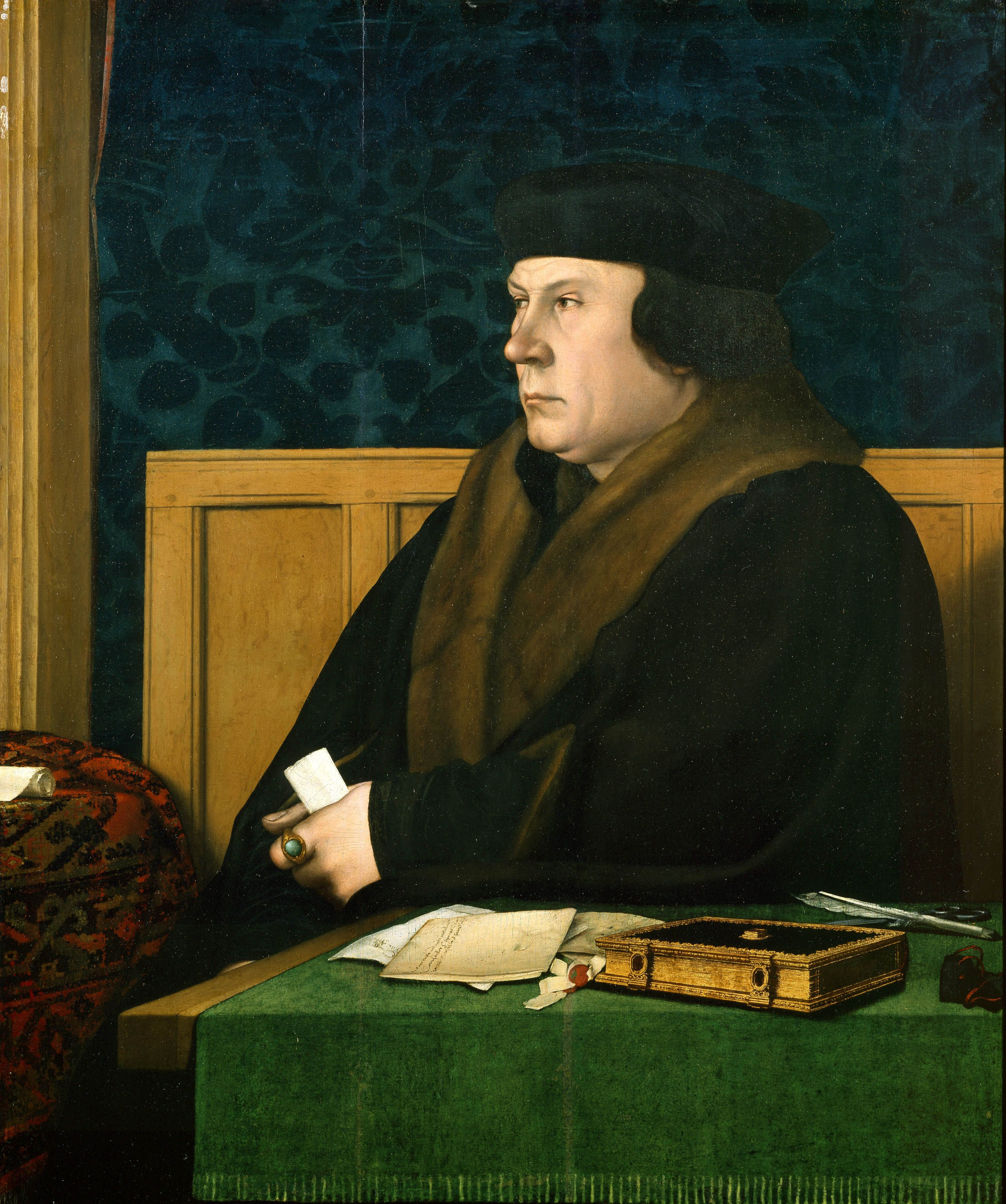
Thomas Cromwell in 1532/1533 by Hans Holbein the Younger

Following the secession of the Church of England from the jurisdiction of the Church of Rome in 1530, and the designation of the monarch, Henry VIII, as the chief power in both the civil and ecclesiastical estates of the realm, it was needed for the establishment of the English Reformation that the reformed Christian doctrines, theology, piety, and practice should be explained and taught as widely as possible among all congregations throughout the realm. Although the liturgy had formerly been conducted entirely in Latin, and holy communion (consisting only of the consecrated bread) was administered twice a year, the progress of reformed faith had long been developing unofficially among the populace at all levels, as much through the Wycliffite tradition, as through the new learning in the universities in its wider European context.

=== The Bishops' Book and King's Book ===
Attempts to reformulate the doctrine of the English Church, led by Archbishop Thomas Cranmer under Thomas Cromwell as Vicegerent, begun with the adoption of the (partly Lutheran) Ten Articles in 1536, was augmented in 1537 by a volume of disquisitions known as the Bishops' Book, or The Institution of a Christen Man. This book was divided into four sections as follows:

* The exposition of the Apostles' Creed
* The declaration of the Seven Sacraments
* The exposition of the Ten Commandments
* The exposition of the Pater noster and the Ave, with the articles of Justification and Purgatory.

Dedicated by the bishops to King Henry, this was first ordered to be read from the pulpits, but then suppressed with a view to revision. In 1539 the Six Articles were enacted in law, a reactionary formula with severe penalties for violation. The revised work called the King's Book, or The Necessary Doctrine and Erudition for Any Christen Man, was deliberated upon at the Convocation of 1540 (at the time of Cromwell's fall) and published in 1543. The King's Book contained sections as follows, as in the Bishops' Book giving lengthy paraphrases or expositions on each of the various articles within the sections, line by line:

* The declaration of Faith
* The articles of our belief, called the Creed
* The seven sacraments
* The ten commandments of almighty god
* Our lord's prayer called the Pater noster
* The salutation of the angel, called the Ave Maria
* An article of free will
* An article of justification
* An article of good works
* Of prayer for souls departed.

== Edwardian Reform: the First Book of Homilies (1547) ==
It was under Thomas Cranmer, the reformist Archbishop of Canterbury through the later reign of King Henry (Defender of the Faith) and that of Edward VI (ruled 1547–1553), that the doctrine presented in the first volume (1547) of the Homilies, Certayne Sermons, or Homelies appoynted by the kynges Maiestie, was formulated. The Six Articles were repealed in the same year. An authorized, unified and clearly expressed statement of doctrine for public understanding was needed, to be placed in the hands of the priesthood at large to deliver it. The preface to the first edition, as under King Edward's authority advised by his Protector, Edward Seymour, Duke of Somerset, takes as its premise the need to cast off the "manifold enormities" and "ungodly doctrine" of the adherents of the "Bishoppe of Rome", which (it says) has led so many away "from doing the commandments of God, unto voluntary works and fantasies invented of men". It was the king's command that the parsons, vicars and curates should read through the homilies Sunday by Sunday (except when a sermon was to be delivered) until the whole book was read, and then to begin again.

This volume therefore preceded the publication of the reformed liturgy in the Edwardian Book of Common Prayer of 1549, its revision of 1552, and the issuing of the Forty-two Articles in 1553. Volume I contains twelve sermons and was mainly written by Cranmer. They focus strongly upon the character of God and Justification by Faith and were printed by the King's Printers, Richard Grafton and Edward Whitchurch.

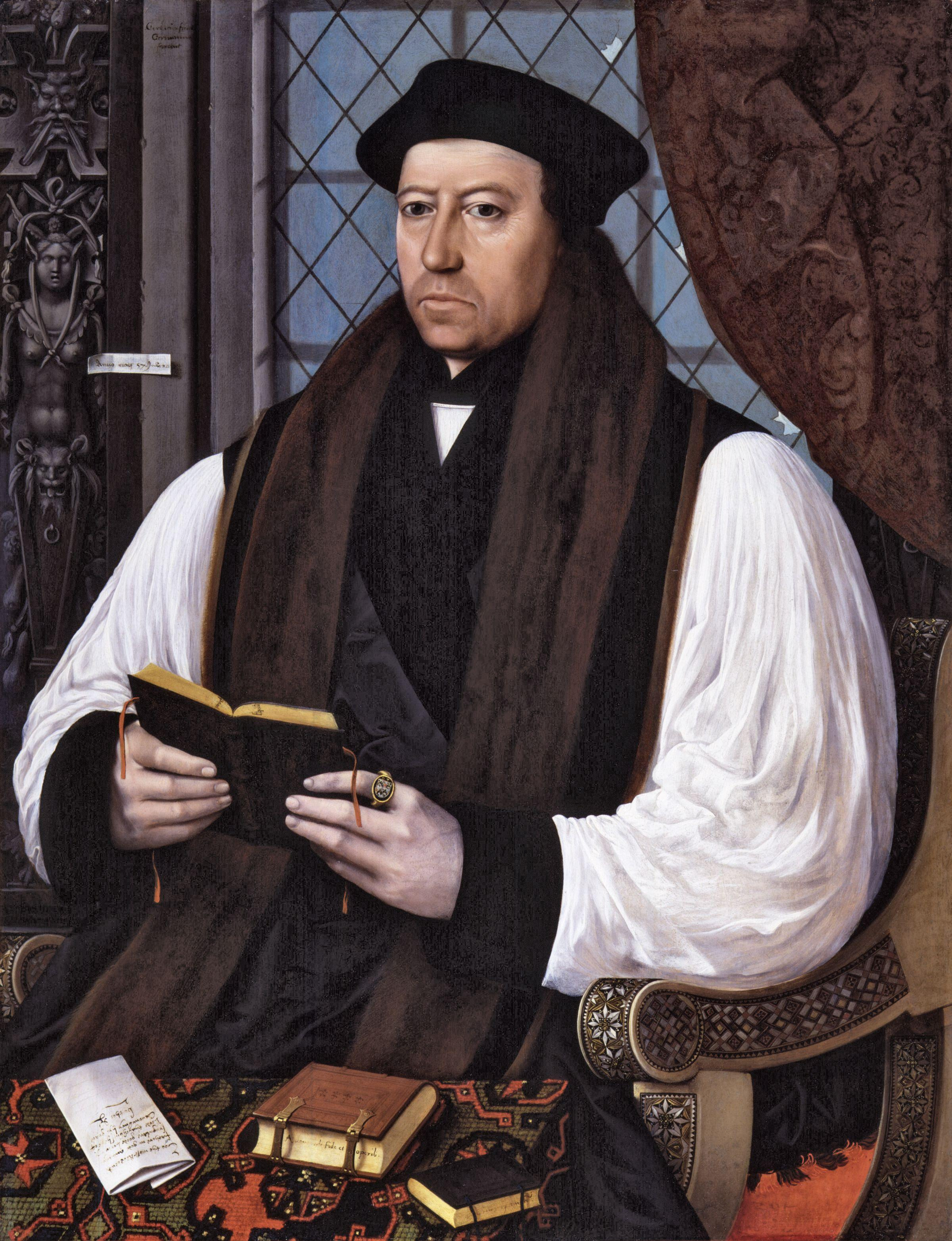
Thomas Cranmer in 1545

The homilies are:

1. A Fruitful exhortation to the reading of holy Scripture.
2. Of the misery of all mankind.
3. Of the salvation of all mankind.
4. Of the true and lively faith.
5. Of good works.
6. Of Christian love and charity.
7. Against swearing and perjury.
8. Of the declining from GOD.
9. An exhortation against the fear of death.
10. An exhortation to obedience.
11. Against whoredom and adultery.
12. Against strife and contention.

At the end of the first volume appeared the following statement:

"Hereafter shall follow Homilies of Fasting, Prayer, Almose-deeds, of the Nativity, Passion, Resurrection, and Ascension of our Saviour Christ: of the due Receiving of his Body and Blood, under the form of Bread and Wine: against Idleness, against Gluttony and Drunkenness, against Couetousness, against Envy, Ire and Malice: with many other matters, as well fruitful and necessary to the edifying of Christian people, and the increase of godly living. GOD SAVE THE KING."

In this way the completion of the work was projected in 1547.

== Elizabethan Reform: the Second Book of Homilies (1563, completed 1571) ==
Title page of the Book of Homilies, 1562 edition

The First Book saw a new edition in 1562, the homilies divided into parts for better understanding: in its preface, the Queen's injunction for them to be read was given. This, and the editions of 1563, 1567 and of 1571, in which the Second Book of homilies and sermons was added, belong to the time of Matthew Parker as archbishop, from the commencement of the reign of Queen Elizabeth I until his death in 1575. They followed that interruption to the Reforms occasioned by Queen Mary I (ruled 1553–1558) and the Roman Catholic Archbishop Reginald Pole (1556–1558), and the execution of Thomas Cranmer (author of much of the first volume) as a heretic in 1556. The Forty-two Articles had not been enforced during Mary's reign, during which the English Church was reunited with that of Rome, but at once regained importance in Elizabeth's religious settlement.

=== 1563 ===
The Second Book, mainly written by Matthew Parker with Bishop John Jewel and others, was printed perhaps in two or more editions by Richarde Iugge and John Cawood, "printers to the Queenes Maiestie". According to Parker, the Homilies had already been printed in 1562 and only awaited the Queen's approval at Midsummer 1563 for final publication. Entitled Certayne Sermons appoynted by the Queenes Maiestie, it contained twenty sermons. Reprints appeared in succeeding years. The publication followed the Convocation's approval of Thirty-Nine Articles, from which the Queen removed a further article to pacify objections from her Catholic subjects. These complete the promised scope of the Homilies as projected in the final notice of the First Book.

=== 1571 ===
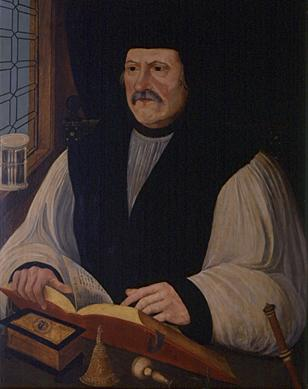
Matthew Parker, Archbishop of Canterbury

The full second series of twenty-one homilies, entitled The Second Tome of Homilees, was published in 1571. The reinstatement of the Thirty-ninth Article, and the publication of the Second Book of Homilies containing the final, twenty-first homily (against Disobedience and wilful Rebellion), followed the excommunication of Queen Elizabeth by the papal bull named Regnans in Excelsis. The Thirty-fifth Article (still so mandated today) states:

"The second Book of Homilies, the several Titles whereof we have joined under this Article, doth contain a godly and wholsom Doctrine, and necessary for these Times, as doth the former Book of Homilies, which were set forth in the time of Edward the Sixth; and therefore we judge them to be read in Churches by the Ministers, diligently and distinctly, that they may be understanded of the People."

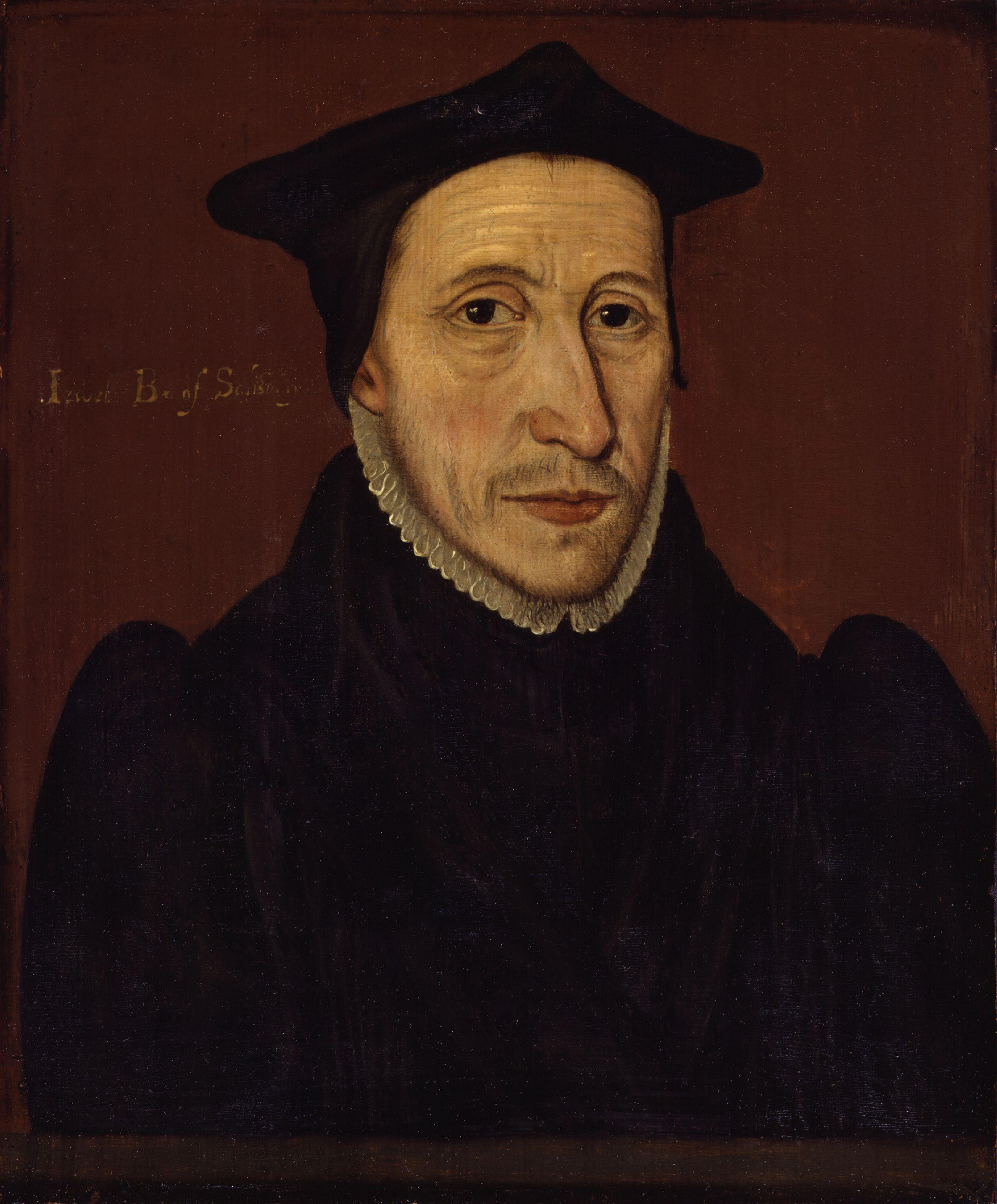
John Jewel, Bishop of Salisbury

This volume includes:

1. Of the right use of the Church.
2. Against peril of Idolatry.
3. For repairing and keeping clean the Church.
4. Of good works. And first of Fasting.
5. Against gluttony and drunkenness.
6. Against excess of apparel.
7. An homily of Prayer.
8. Of the place and time of Prayer.
9. Of Common Prayer and Sacraments
10. An information of them which take offence at certain places of holy Scripture.
11. Of alms deeds.
12. Of the Nativity.
13. Of the Passion for good Friday.
14. Of the Resurrection for Easter day.
15. Of the worthy receiving of the Sacrament.
16. An Homily concerning the coming down of the holy Ghost, for Whitsunday.
17. An Homily for Rogation week.
18. Of the state of Matrimony.
19. Against Idleness.
20. Of Repentance and true Reconciliation unto God.
21. An Homily against disobedience and willful rebellion.

=== Character of the Homilies ===
Many of the sermons are straightforward exhortations to read scripture daily and lead a life of prayer and faith in Jesus Christ; the other works are lengthy scholarly treatises intended to inform church leaders in theology, church history, the fall of the Byzantine Empire and those aspects of the Roman Catholic Church and doctrine from which the Reformed Anglican faith had turned away. Each homily is heavily annotated with references to holy scripture, the Church Fathers and other primary sources.

The longest homily is the second of the second book, "Against Peril of Idolatry", which runs to about 136 printed pages (pp. 25–161 in the 1571 edition) and is divided into three parts. The first part elaborates the Mosaic law against the worship of images, and down to St Paul's condemnations: the second part follows the patristic writings on the same point, and traces from the Iconoclastic Controversy (which underlay the schism between Western and Eastern churches, and aroused Rome's hostility towards the parts of Christendom not under papal authority). The third part presents, from the perspective of the Reformed Church, a history of such Roman Catholic religious teachings and practices as were deemed to have led to idolatrous observances, as, for instance:

"And where one saint hath images in divers places, the same saint hath divers names thereof, moste lyke to the Gentiles. When you heare of our Lady of Walsingham, our Lady of Ipswich, our Lady of Wilsdon, and suche other: what is it but an imitation of the Gentiles idolaters? Diana Agrotera, Diana Coriphea, Diana Ephesia, etc., Venus Cipria, Venus Paphia, Venus Gnidia. Whereby is evidently meant, that the saint for the image sake, shoulde in those places, yea in the images them selves, have a dwellyng, whiche is the grounde of theyr idolatrie. For where no images be, they have no such meanes" (at p. 99).

The homilies contain many historical spellings, based on the Vulgate and Septuagint, of Biblical names such as Noe for Noah and Esay for Isaiah. The colourful expression "mummishe massyng" appears in the fifteenth sermon of the second book (Of the worthy receaving of the Sacrament), not to characterize the Mass itself, but (on the contrary) to describe those who come to the Lord's Supper "unreverentlye, not discerning the Lordes bodye" (like the Corinthians blamed by St Paul, I Corinthians, xi, 27–29), with "rude and unreverent ignoraunce", as if it were a mime-show.

== Editions ==
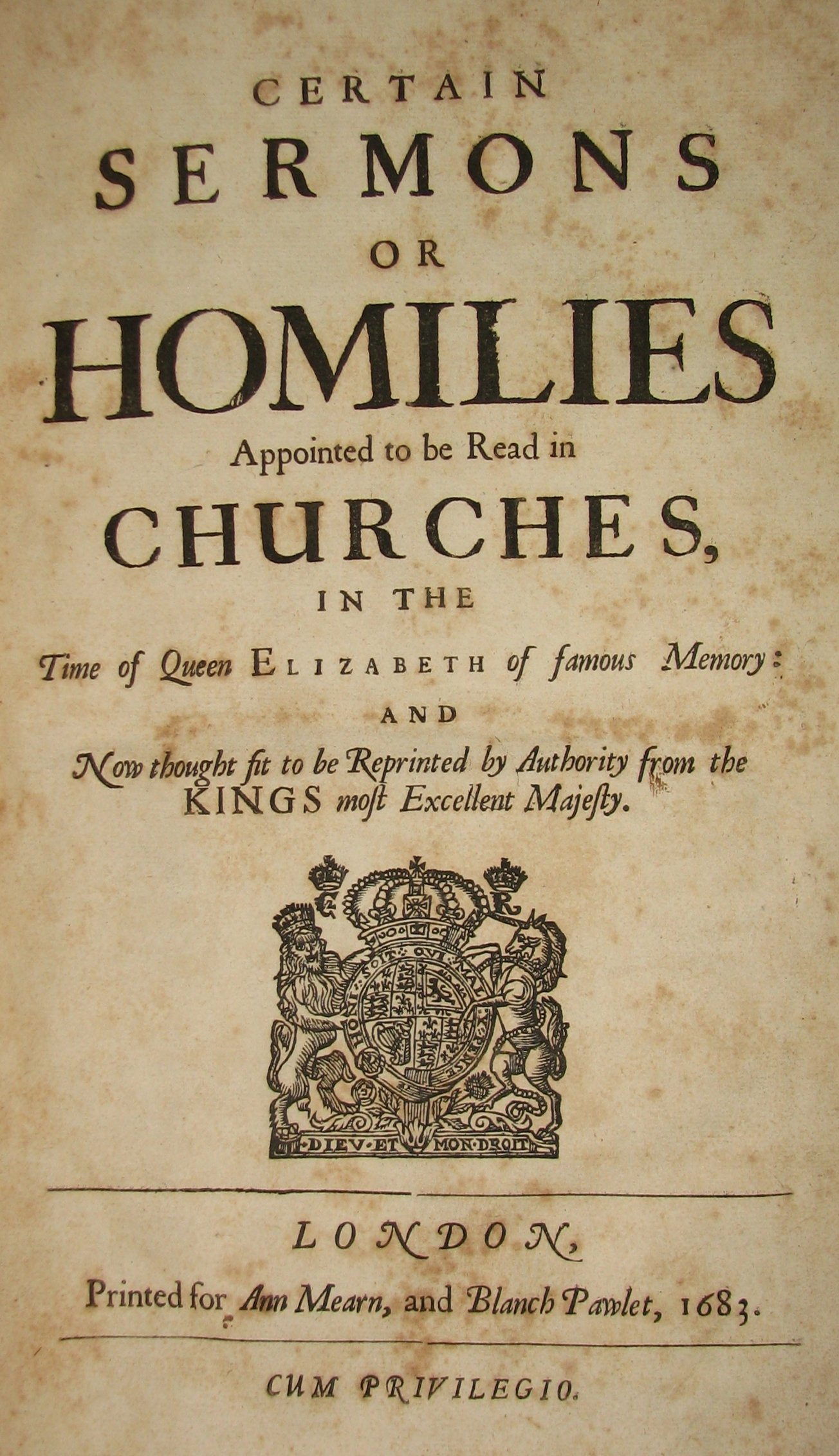
Title page of the 1683 London Mearne and Pawlet reprint

The following recensions were issued down to 1623, some under public authority:

- Richard Jugge, Queen's Printer (died 1577): Volumes I and II (1574); Volumes I and II (1576–1577), in quarto
- Christopher Barker, Queen's Printer and Henry Middleton: Volumes I and II (1582), in quarto
- John Charlewood and Thomas East: Volumes I and II (1587), in quarto
- Edward Allde: Volumes I and II (1595), in quarto
- John Bill, King's Printer: Both parts (with numerous revisions) united (1623), in folio

Some later recensions include:

- John Norton, for Joyce Norton and Richard Whitaker (London, 1633/1635)
- Ralph Hodkinson and John Norton for Richard Whitaker (London 1640 [1650])
- Thomas Roycroft, for Andrew Crooke, Samuel Mearne and Robert Powlet (London 1673)
- Thomas Roycroft, for Samuel Mearne and Robert Powlet (London 1676)
- Ann Mearn and Blanch Pawlet (London 1683)
- For Moses Pitt, Peter Parkins and Thomas Guy (The Theatre, Oxford 1683)
- George Wells, Abel Swall and George Pawlett (London 1687), "for use of private families"

The edition of the Homilies most widely available today is that edited in 1859 by John Griffiths and originally published by Oxford University Press. An earlier edition published by Oxford in 1822 has been criticised for its heavy editing.

A critical edition of the Homilies appeared in 2015, edited by Gerald Bray. An edition of the First Book of Homilies in modern English was published in 2021 for the Church Society, edited by Lee Gatiss.

== Reception in the United States ==
The Episcopal Church's version of the Articles endorses the content of the Homilies, but states that it suspends the order for reading them until they can be updated.

== See also ==
- Anglican doctrine
- Tract 90
- Postil
