= Our Lady of Willesden =

Title of the Virgin Mary in London

Coordinates: 51.549°N 0.249883°W

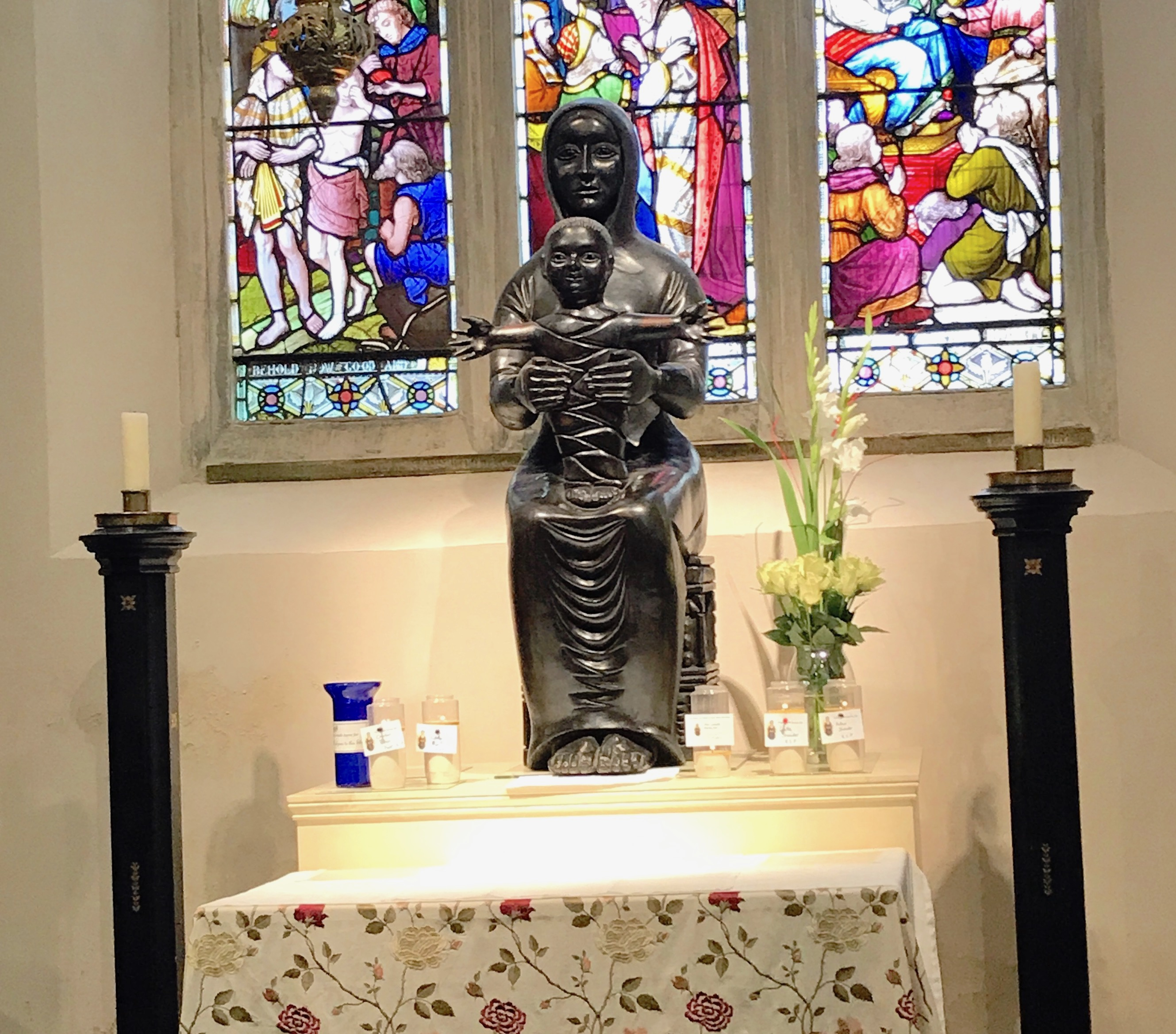
The Black Madonna image of Our Lady of Willesden in the restored shrine at St Mary's parish church.

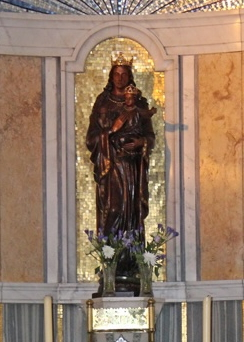
Statue of Our Lady of Willesden in the Catholic shrine chapel

Our Lady of Willesden is a title of the Blessed Virgin Mary venerated by Christians in London, especially by Anglicans, Catholics, and Eastern Orthodox. It is associated with the historic image (statue) and pilgrimage centre in the community of Willesden, originally a village in Middlesex, England, but now a suburb of London. The pre-Reformation shrine was home to the Black Madonna of Willesden statue.

== History ==
Once a country shrine some eight miles from London, Willesden has always possessed a well, from which the community derives its name, which means "spring at the foot of the hill". The well was associated with the Blessed Virgin Mary, and with the church dedicated to her, St Mary's, Willesden. The church and well are of great antiquity, being mentioned in a royal charter of 939. Whilst the origins of the pilgrimage tradition are lost in history, it is clear that a significant volume of pilgrims visited the site, and medieval pilgrim medals were struck and sold, a number of which have been uncovered by archeological investigation. Thomas More was a pilgrim here only a fortnight before his arrest.

A Visitation report dated 1249 reports two statues of the Blessed Virgin Mary at St Mary's Church. It is uncertain what the second image was, but the primary one was the "Black Madonna" image of Our Lady of Willesden, the central point of veneration for the pilgrims who journeyed to Willesden. The statue was said to possess miraculous powers.

At the Reformation the English shrines of Mary were destroyed, and their images burned. The "Black Madonna" image of Our Lady of Willesden was dragged to Chelsea in 1538, and burned there by the King's Commissioners.

== Restoration ==
In a similar manner to Our Lady of Walsingham, who is venerated at twin Anglican and Roman Catholic shrines a mile apart, Our Lady of Willesden today has two shrines. The original has been restored in the Anglican parish church of St Mary, and a Roman Catholic shrine has been established about two miles away in the Roman Catholic Church of Our Lady of Willesden, where a crowned image of Our Lady forms the focus of the shrine. At both Walsingham and Willesden the twin shrines provide a vehicle for practical ecumenical endeavour between the two traditions.

=== St Mary's Church ===
At the start of the twentieth century the Reverend James Dixon, Vicar of Willesden, restored the shrine, and placed a gilded image of Mary and Jesus at the location within the parish church where the original had once stood. A small number of pilgrims began visiting the shrine. The Right Reverend Graham Leonard, Bishop of Willesden 1964–1973, actively promoted pilgrimage to the shrine of Our Lady of Willesden, and in 1972 a new "Black Madonna" statue was commissioned from the sculptor Catharni Stern.

The original spring and holy well at St Mary's Church, which had become lost through disuse after the Reformation, were rediscovered in 1998, and returned to use.

The original shrine at St Mary's Church is administered by the parochial church council, working in close cooperation with the Chapter of Our Lady of Willesden. The day-to-day direction of the Companionate is in the hands of a chapter of capitular priests (usually numbering six, of whom the vicar of St Mary's, Willesden, is a member ex officio), and laity (of whom the churchwardens of St Mary's are also ex officio members). Chapter priests of Our Lady of Willesden are distinguished by a black mozzetta with pale blue buttons, piping of blue and gold, and the seal of Our Lady of Willesden embroidered on the left breast. Lay members of the chapter are distinguished by a pale blue collarette from which the shrine badge is displayed.

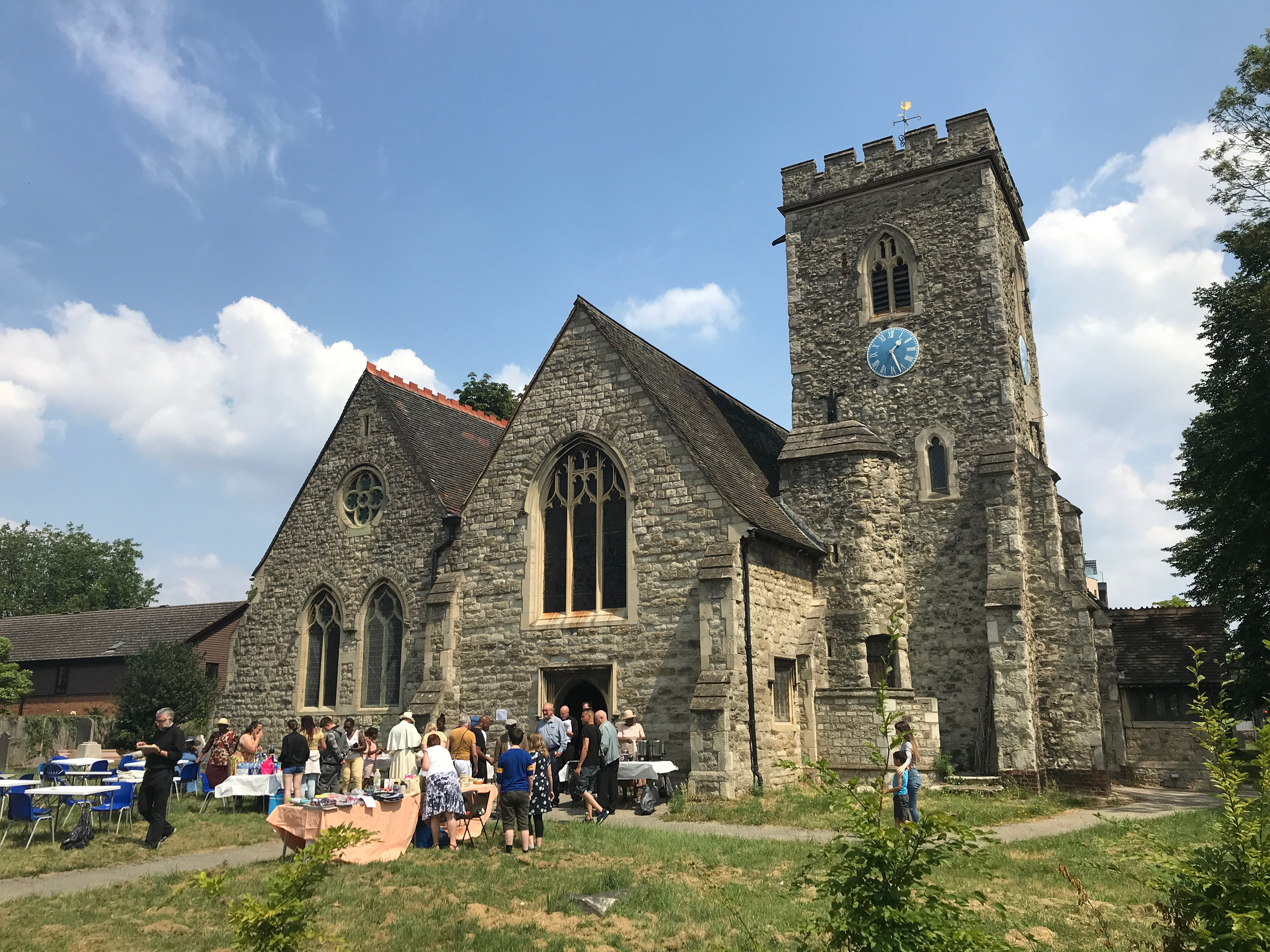
St Mary's parish church and the original shrine

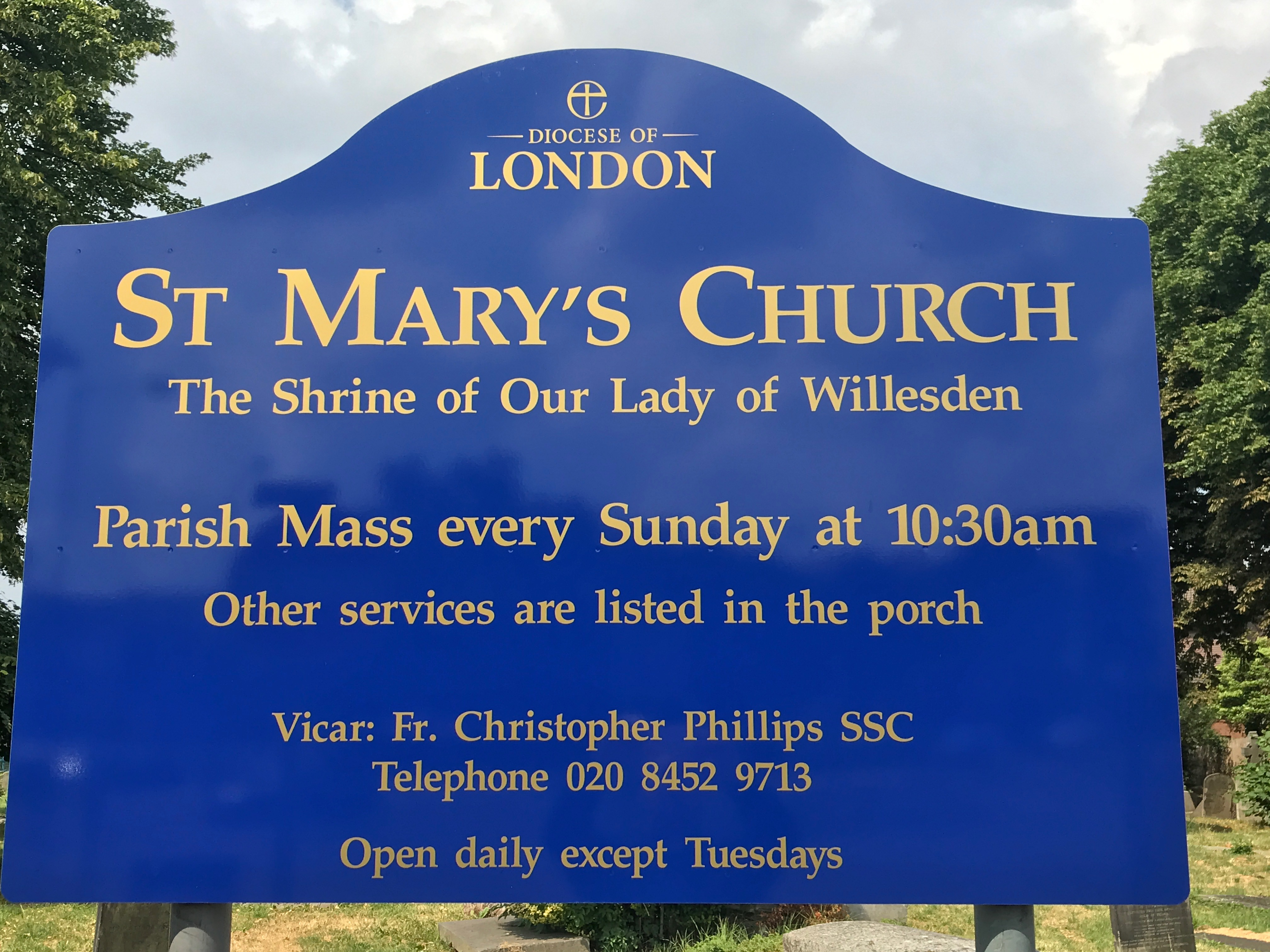
Sign at the Anglican shrine

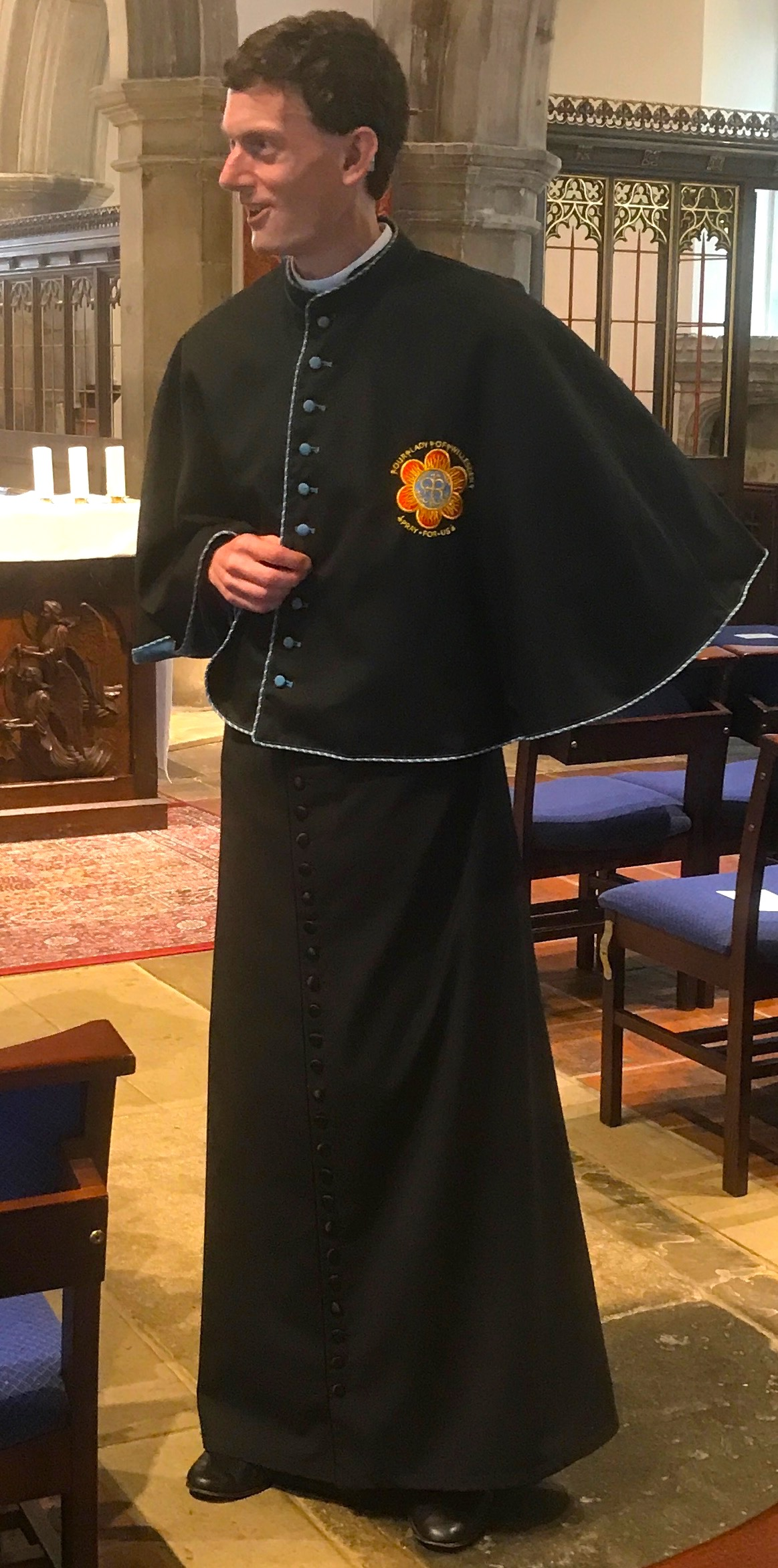
A chapter priest wearing the mozzetta of that rank

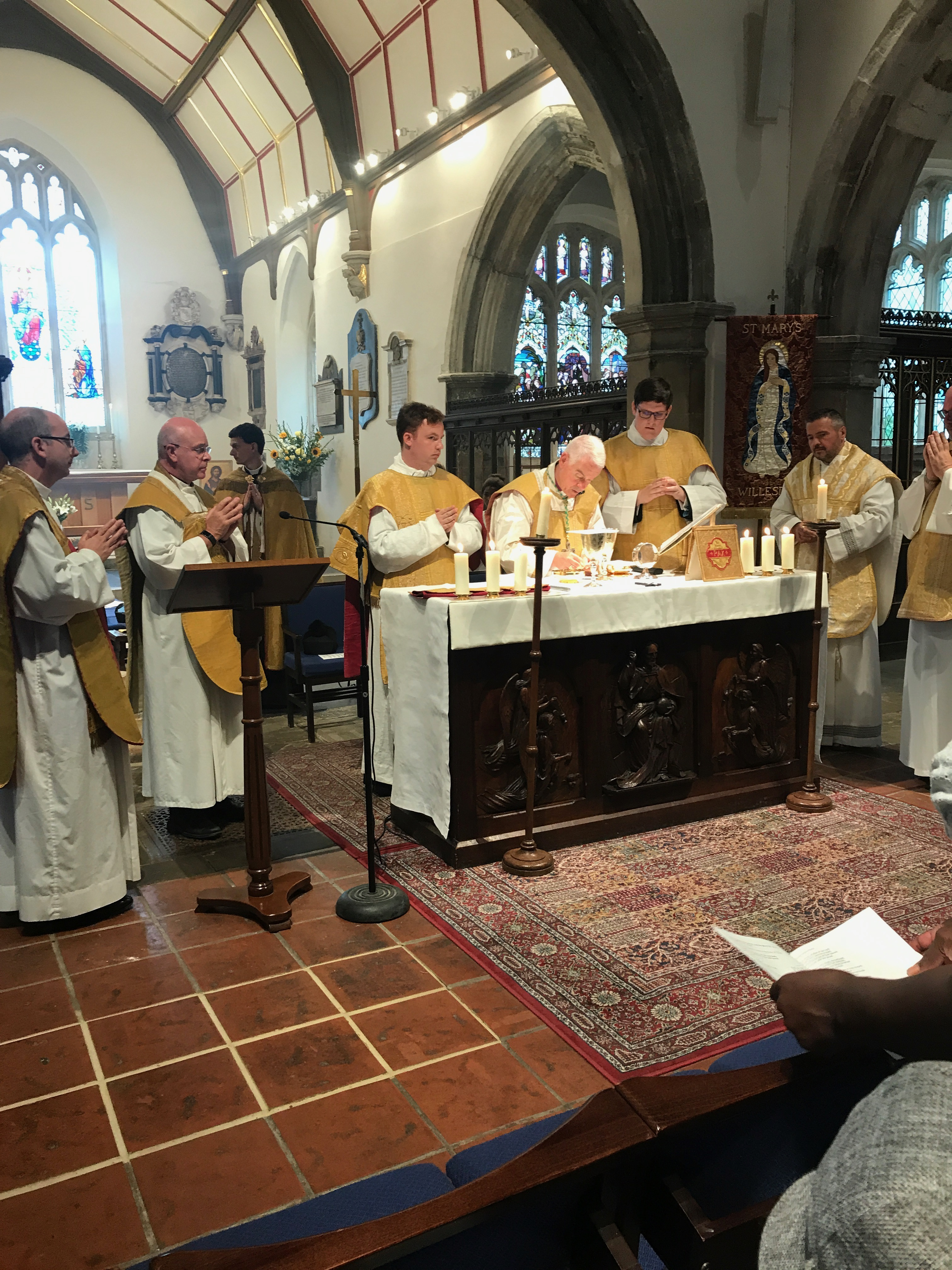
The Episcopal Patron celebrating with chapter-priests of the shrine the pilgrimage mass in 2018

=== Church of Our Lady of Willesden ===
In 1885 a Catholic mission was established in Harlesden. The mission was served by a temporary chapel on Manor Park Road. In the chapel: "[W]ith the help of the local Convent of Jesus and Mary, devotion was fostered to Our Lady of Willesden and a new statue blessed by Cardinal Vaughan in 1892." In 1907, a larger church was built in Crown Hill. The mission became a parish in 1918.

In 1929, plans were drawn up for the construction of a new, larger church. The church was opened in 1931, in the Romanesque Revival style and it is a Grade II listed building. The northeast chapel is the shrine chapel of Our Lady of Willesden.

On 15 August 1958, the feast of the Assumption, Saint Josemaría Escrivá consecrated Opus Dei to the Virgin Mary there in the church. The shrine chapel was refurbished in 1995. The Guild of Our Lady of Willesden was established in 2002. The Roman Catholic Diocese of Westminster celebrates the Feast of Our Lady of Willesden on 3 October. The annual Catholic pilgrimage takes place in May.

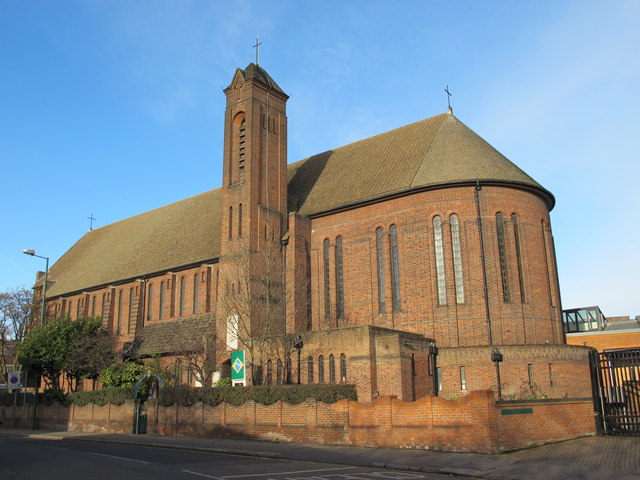
Our Lady of Willesden Church, Harlesden

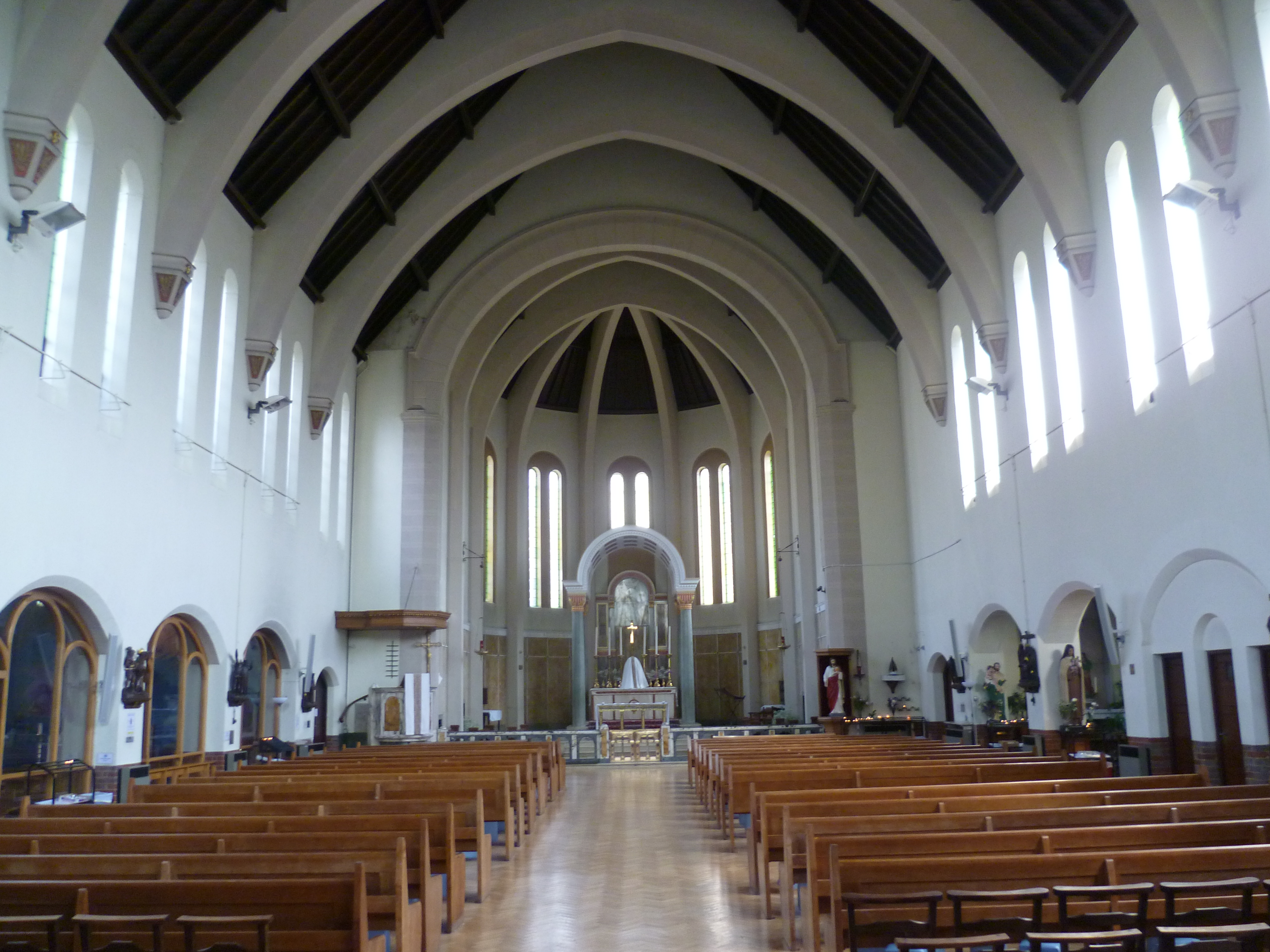
Church interior

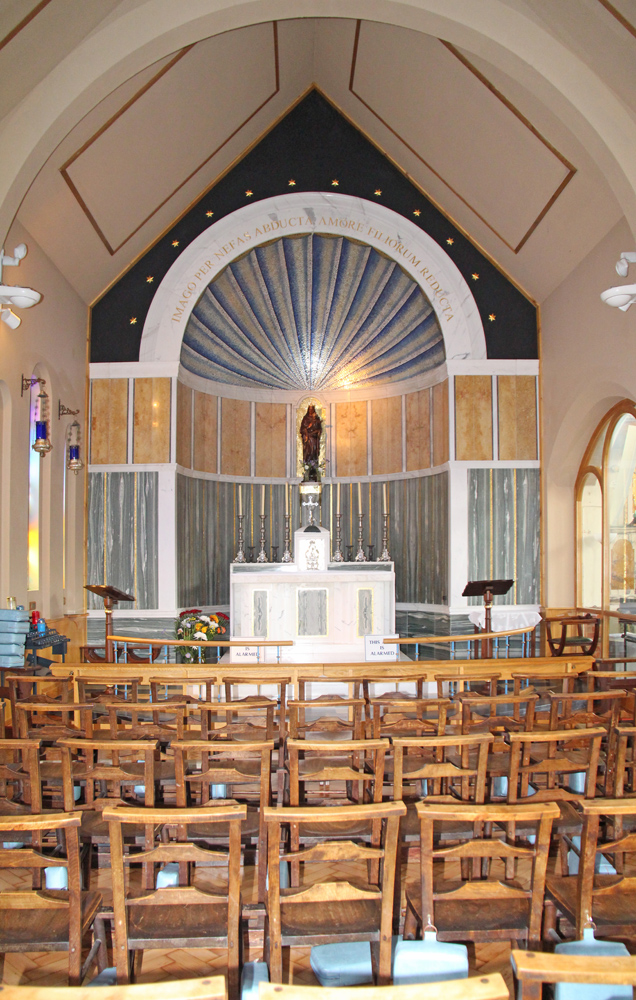
North chapel

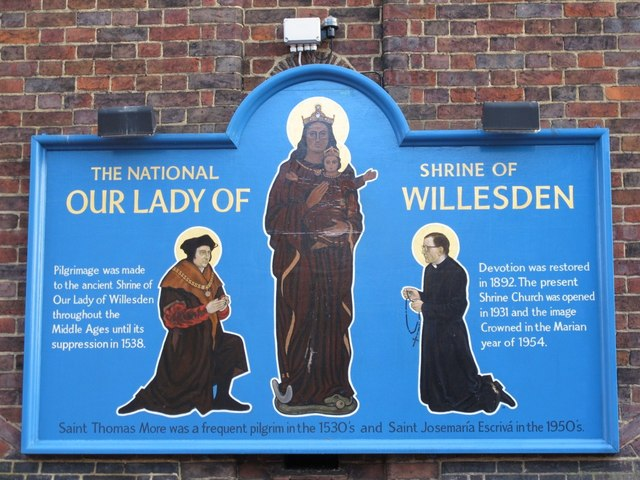
Church sign

=== Crowning at Wembley Stadium ===
On 3 October 1954, the Catholic statue of Our Lady of Willesden was crowned at Wembley Stadium. It was done as part of the centenary celebrations of Ineffabilis Deus, the definition of the Immaculate Conception. A Pontifical High Mass was celebrated in the stadium, attended by approximately 94,000. The Mass was celebrated by Cardinal Bernard Griffin, the Archbishop of Westminster. After the Mass and crowning ceremony, a procession of around 2,000 people was done, which carried the statue to Our Lady of Willesden Church. At the church, the statue was received by the cardinal, bishops and the papal nuncio to Great Britain, Archbishop Gerald O'Hara.

== See also ==
- Dowry of Mary
- Our Lady of Cardigan
- Our Lady of Doncaster
- Our Lady of Ipswich
- Our Lady of Walsingham
- Our Lady of Westminster
