= St Mary at the Elms =

St Mary at the Elms, Ipswich
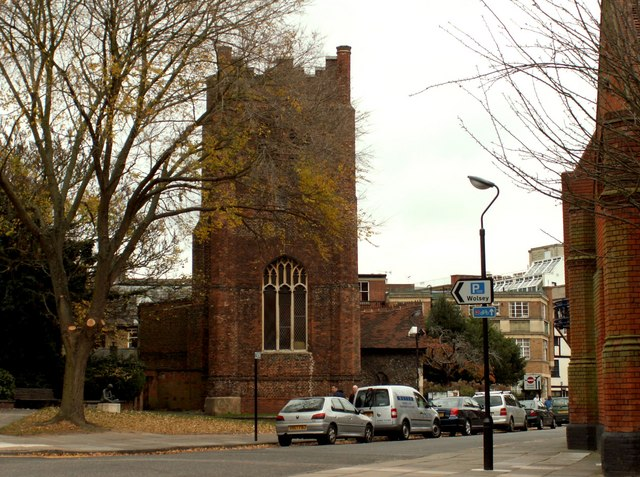
- St Mary at the Elms in 2007
- St Mary at the Elms, Ipswich
- 52°3′25.55″N 1°8′59.96″E
- OS grid reference: TM 16060 44541
- Location: Ipswich
- Country: England
- Denomination: Church of England
- Churchmanship: Anglo-Catholic (Forward in Faith)

History
- Dedication: St Mary

Architecture
- Heritage designation: Grade II listed

Administration
- Diocese: Diocese of St Edmundsbury and Ipswich
- Archdeaconry: Ipswich
- Deanery: Ipswich
- Parish: St Mary at the Elms

Clergy
- Bishop: The Rt Revd Luke Irvine-Capel (AEO)
- Vicar: Canon John Thackray

St Mary at the Elms is a Church of England church in Ipswich, Suffolk, England. Historically it was located in the West ward, but is now in Alexandra ward.

== Description ==
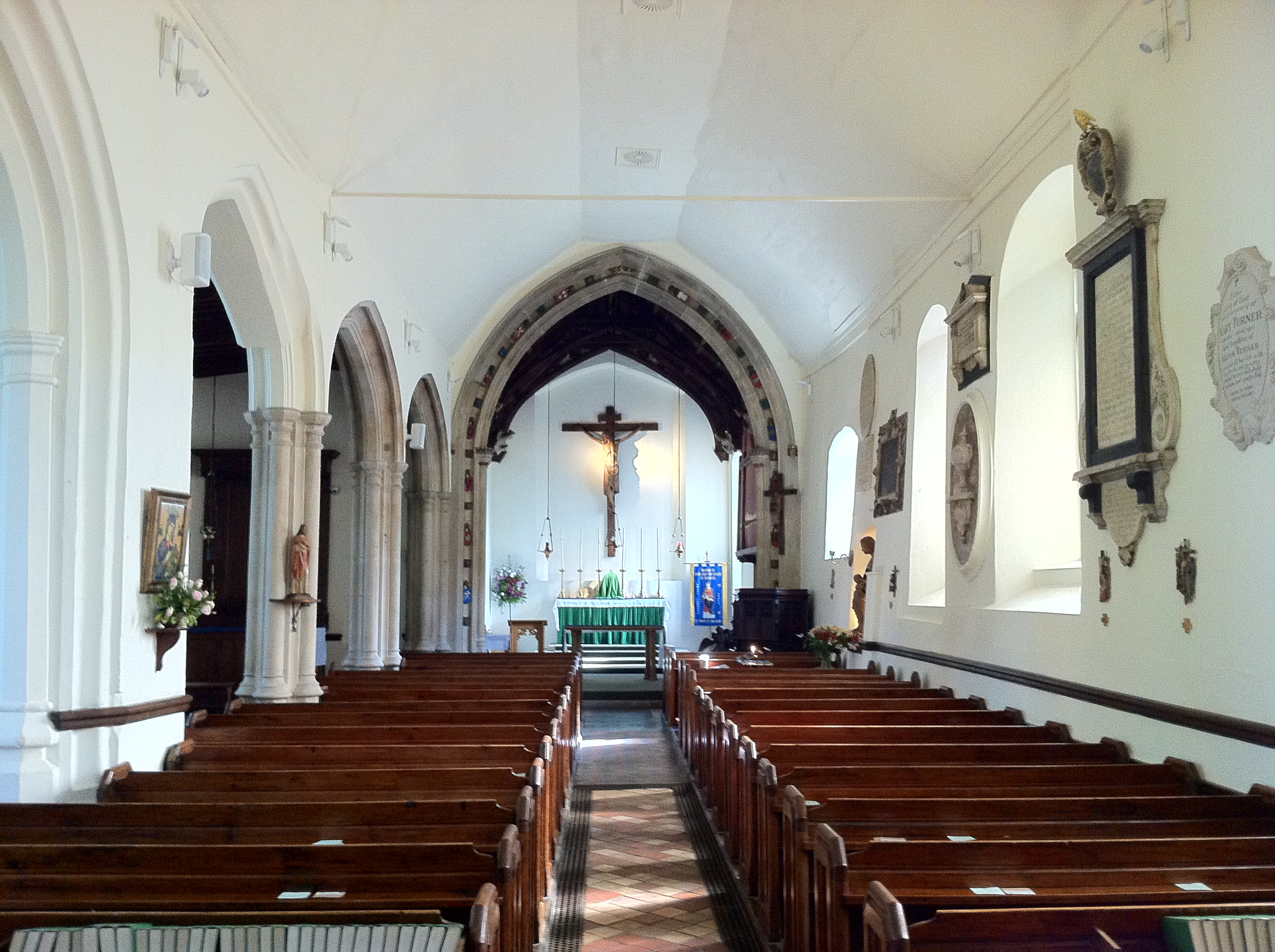
The nave of St Mary at the Elms

The church has a Norman south doorway. The nave and north aisle are perpendicular gothic. The north chapel and chancel date from 1883.

It is a high Anglican Church and affiliated to Forward in Faith. It houses the statue of Our Lady of Ipswich, which is a copy of a statue in Nettuno that was originally in Ipswich

In July 2010 it was damaged by fire.

== Organ ==
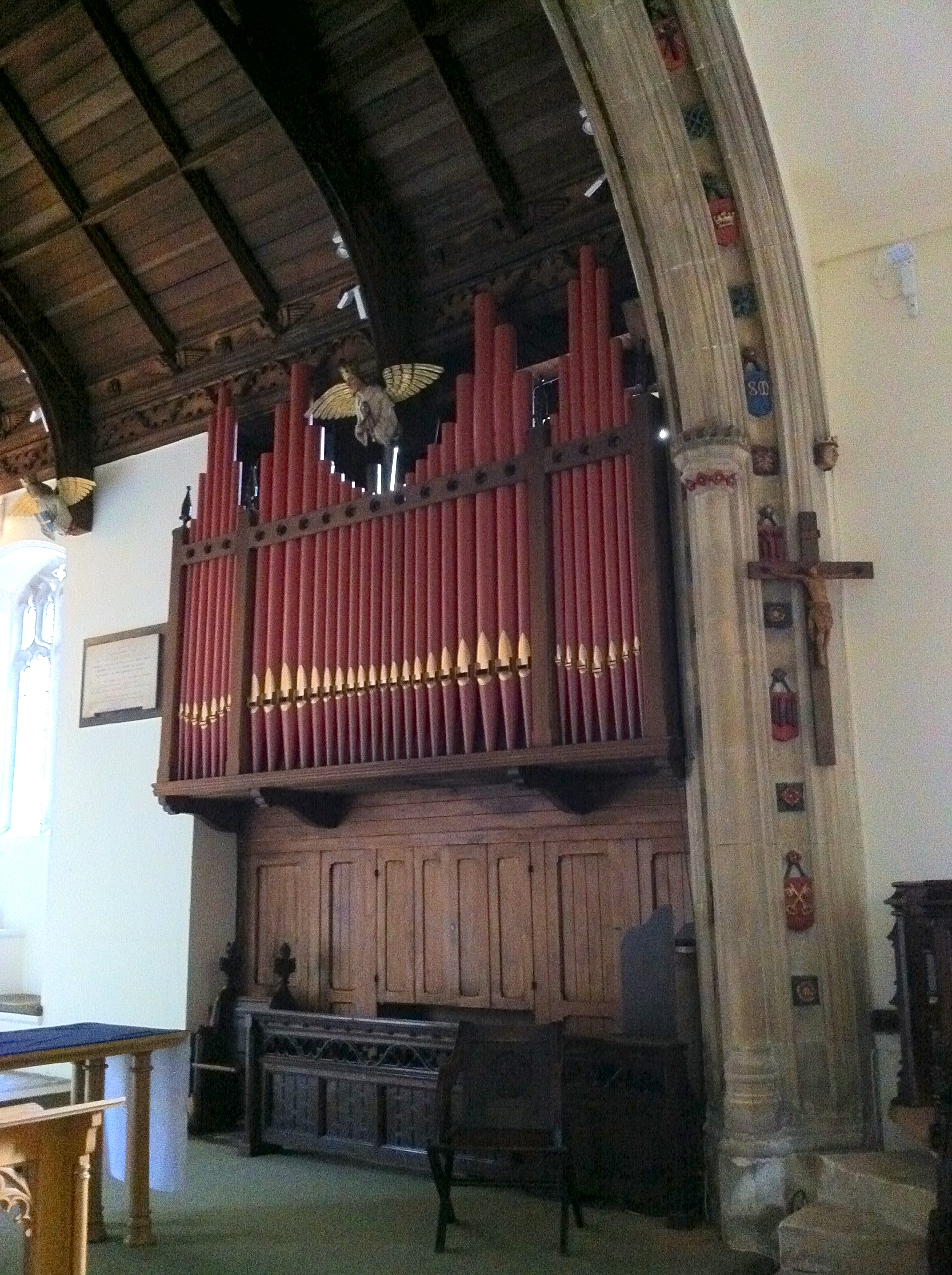
The organ, St Mary at the Elms, Suffolk by Hunter (1912).

The organ is by Hunter and dates from 1912. Details of the organ can be found on the National Pipe Organ Register.
