= Jane Wentworth =

English visionary (1503–1572)

Jane or Anne Wentworth (known as the Maid of Ipswich) (c. 1503-1572?), was an English visionary. She was a knight's daughter from Ipswich, Suffolk.

Sir Thomas More published (in ch. xvi. of his Dialogue on catholic practices, 1528) a categorical statement of his belief in the divine inspiration of 'the maid of Ipswich,' a daughter of Sir Roger Wentworth of Ipswich, who, although only twelve years old, had in 1527 imitated most of Elizabeth Barton's early experiences, and had then retired to the Abbey of the Minories (Cranmer's Works, Parker Soc. p. 65). Wentworth afterwards withdrew her pretensions to the gift of prophecy. William Tyndale repeatedly denounced both Elizabeth of Kent and Anne of Ipswich as impostors from 1528 onwards (cf. his The Obedience of a Christian Man (1528), p. 327, and his Answer to Sir Thomas More's Dialogue (1530), p. 91, in Parker Soc. edition of Tyndale's Works).

== See also ==
- Anne Wentworth (prophetess)
