= Anne Wentworth (prophetess) =

English prophetess

Anne Wentworth was a seventeenth-century English prophetess and writer, who gained followers and a patron that funded the publications of her religious writings. She was separated from her husband, which caused unstableness in their relationship that influenced her prophecies.

== Early years ==
Most of what is known about Anne Wentworth comes from her four extant texts, which are autobiographical in nature. While these texts do not provide specific details of her early life, it is suspected that she was born into a Lincolnshire family between 1629 and 1630.

== Career ==
In 1652/1653, Anne Wentworth married William Wentworth of London (Gill 115). In the late 1660s, she gave birth to a daughter (Taft). Several years later, around 1670, Anne experienced a restoration of faith in God after enduring eighteen years in an unhappy marriage. After this "visitation" from God, she spent nearly seven years improving her writing, before publishing her first work, a pamphlet titled A True Account of Anne Wentworth's Being Cruelly, Unjustly, and Unchristianly Dealt with by Some of Those People Called Anabaptists (1676), commonly referred to as A True Account of Anne Wentworth (Taft). In this piece, she reflects on the patriarchal domination of her husband, understanding it to be a punishment from God (Taft).

Despite taking Wentworth seven years to publish her first work, her life as a prophetess did not go unnoticed (Taft). During this period, her husband and fellow Anabaptist comrades (now known as Baptists) began to persecute Wentworth as she voiced out her prophecies. In 1675, it remained unclear whether Wentworth was excommunicated from their denomination after writing critiques on it (Gill 115) or if she left it of her own free will (Taft). Nonetheless, it is evident that the abuse from her husband and fellow Anabaptists intensified after she no longer belonged to their local church.

In 1677, Wentworth published A Vindication of Anne Wentworth, another autobiographical work akin to A True Account. This work aimed to "justify her prophetic voice as genuine, recount the persecution inflicted she endured due to her prophetic activities, and predict the impending Apocalypse" (Taft). During this period, she also sent letters to King Charles II and the Lord Mayor of London relating to them the upcoming Apocalypse "before New Year's Day, 1678" (Taft). Her actions provoked her husband which pushed him to enlist three of his cousins to forcibly remove Wentworth from her home in the summer of 1677 (Taft). Despite the decline in her popularity after the failure in her prophecy, Anne continued to write England's Spiritual Pill, which was believed to have been published in 1678, but its publication date is uncertain" (Taft) and The Revelation of Jesus Christ, which was meant to record "the actual words Christ... spoke to her" that incited her prophetic voice. This text also acts as proof that someone still supported her after 1678 due to the line, "Friend in love to Souls" that is recognized on the work's title page, recognizing the individual who financed its publication in 1679. That same year, Wentworth returned to her home.

After The Revelation of Jesus Christ, no other texts was said to have been written by Wentworth. Her voice was silenced and there is speculation suggesting that she may be the Anne Wentworth who lived "in St John's Court and was buried on 22 May 1693 at St James's Church, Clerkenwell" (Gill 115), but there is no confirmation on this.

During Wentworth's era, her writings were published and she was recognized as a public figure in her community. Due to her departure from traditionally accepted behavior for women of her time, Wentworth's life was tainted by chaos and persecution. Nevertheless, she continued to write and publish works that held great significance to her.

== Selected works ==
=== A True Account of Anne Wentworth (1676) ===
A True Account of Anne Wentworth was published in 1676 as the first published work by Anne Wentworth. Its full title is "A True Account of Anne Wentworth Being cruelly, unjustly, and unchristianly dealt with by some of those people called Anabaptists". It is a seventeen-page pamphlet that describes an account of her eighteen years spent with her suppressive husband. It is a fairly vague description of the actual abuses her husband acted against her but it does claim she came very close to death, caused by her husband's treatment, only to be saved by God. She also describes the threats and suppressing behavior of the fellow Anabaptists of her town. In her True Account, Wentworth proclaims God as her one true savior and Christianity as the one true religion (Wentworth, Freeman). She describes leaving her heavenly husband for God as her Spiritual Bridegroom (Gillespie).

=== A Vindication of Anne Wentworth (1677) ===
A Vindication of Anne Wentworth published in 1677 was Wentworth's second work. In this pamphlet Wentworth goes into greater detail about her abuse by her husband and the Anabaptists. She also prophesizes the upcoming apocalypse God has promised. In A Vindication Wentworth states that she is not seeking revenge and hopes her husband will be saved himself. She ensures that she was an unwilling party in her writings and only by the fear of God's imminent power did she expose her husband's wrongdoings. Wentworth concludes with a poem about her mistreatment, her innocence, and the forthcoming apocalypse that will punish London for her sins (Wentworth, Freeman).

=== England's Spiritual Pill (1679) ===
Published in 1679, this is the last of Anne Wentworth's known works. The complete title to this piece is ENGLANDS SPIRITUAL PILL Which will Purge, Cure, or Kill; DECLARING The Great and Wonderful Things WHICH The Almighty and most High God JESUS CHRIST King of Kings, and Lord of Lords, Hath Revealed unto ANNE WENTWORTH CONCERNING A Through-Reformation of Church-worship, from all Hypocritical and Idolatrous Formalities, the downfall of Babylon, and the finishing of her Testimony.

Similar to A Revelation of Jesus Christ, this piece too, deals with the encounters between Jesus Christ and Anne Wentworth. She says that because of the success of her first book, she has a continued duty to enlighten people before the wrath of God is upon them.

=== A Revelation of Jesus Christ (1679) ===
"Just as he spake it in Verses at several times, and sometimes in Prose, unto his Faithful Servant, Anne Wentworth, who suffereth for his Name" (Freeman 693).

A Revelation of Jesus Christ, published in 1679, is the text in which Wentworth records the conversations she had with Christ from 1677 to 1679. Within the text she advises friends to awake and speak the truth of God, but it appears they seem doubtful of her prophecies, prompting Wentworth to write "For when the Lord of Life sends in love to warn you,/ Ye slight his Word, because his Voice ye never knew" (Freeman 701). This launches the discussion between Wentworth and Christ about how the ignorant people around her will suffer when the end of the world arrives.
