= Dowry of Mary =

Catholic title for England

Dowry of Mary (or Dowry of the Virgin, Our Lady's Dowry, and similar variations) is a title used in Catholic contexts to refer to England. It dates back to medieval times and had become widespread by the middle of the fourteenth century. It reflects the deep devotion to Mary that existed in medieval England, and the belief that she took a particular protective interest in the country's affairs.

== Early use ==
The title originated in the Medieval period, when devotion to the Virgin Mary in England was particularly strong. It was believed that England belonged in some special way to Mary, who was seen as the country's "protectress" and who through her powers of intercession acted as the country's defender or guardian. Though the title's precise origin is unknown, it had become widespread by the middle of the fourteenth century, and around the year 1350 a mendicant preacher stated in a sermon that "it is commonly said that the land of England is the Virgin's dowry". Around fifty years later, Archbishop Thomas Arundel, discussing Mary and the Incarnation, wrote that "we English, being ... her own Dowry, as we are commonly called, ought to surpass others in the fervour of our praises and devotions". The Archbishop's letter suggests that at the time of his writing it was already in common use.

By the reign of Henry V, the title dos Mariae, "dowry of Mary", was being applied to England in Latin texts and according to chronicler Thomas Elmham, English priests sought the intercession of "the Virgin, protectress of her dower" on the eve of the Battle of Agincourt.

== Depictions in art ==
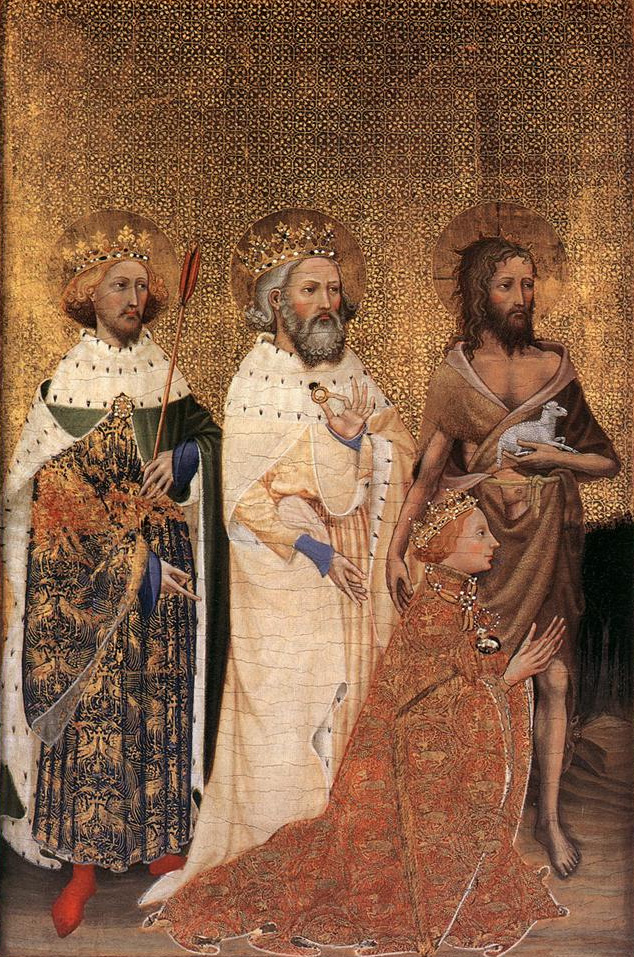
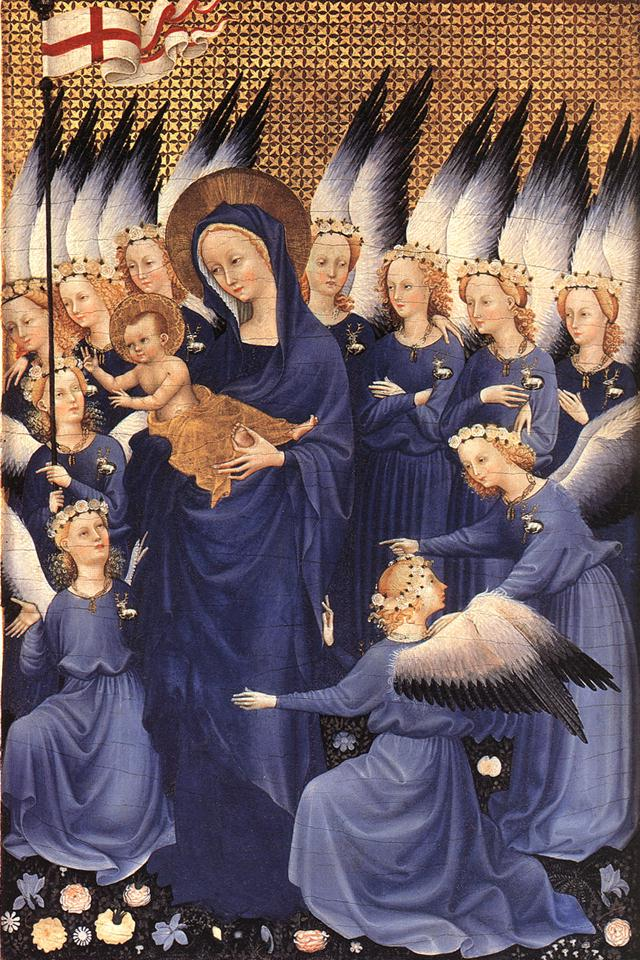
The Wilton Diptych (c. 1395).

The Wilton Diptych, completed around 1395, depicts Richard II kneeling before the Virgin and Child. Carried by a nearby angel is the Cross of St George, the staff of which is surmounted by an orb featuring a minuscule map of England. An altarpiece from the same era showed Richard handing the orb to Mary, with the inscription Dos tua Virgo pia haec est, "This is thy dowry, O Holy Virgin".

In the wake of the English Reformation, the notion of England enjoying a special association or relationship with Mary became an important aspect of recusant Catholic spirituality. The residents at English College in Valladolid, Spain, owned a painting which depicted Mary being handed a scroll carrying the words, "We will remain under the shade of your wings till the wickedness passes" by a group of kneeling Jesuits. The painting's superscription read Anglia dos Mariae, "England, Mary's dowry". At a college in Seville, it was reported that students had raised a painting of Mary carrying the superscription "Anglia Dos Mariae. England is the Dowry of Our Lady".

== Papal recognition ==
Pope Leo XIII referred to England's association with the title in 1893. Addressing a group of Catholic pilgrims from England in Rome, he spoke of "the wonderful filial love which burnt within the heart of your forefathers towards the great Mother of God ... to whose service they consecrated themselves with such abundant proofs of devotion, that the kingdom itself acquired the singular and highly honourable title of 'Mary's Dowry.'"

== See also ==
- Catholic Church in England and Wales
- Catholic Mariology
- Our Lady of Walsingham
- Our Lady of Westminster
- Patron saint
