= Our Lady of Westminster =

Coordinates: 51.49577°N 0.13910°W

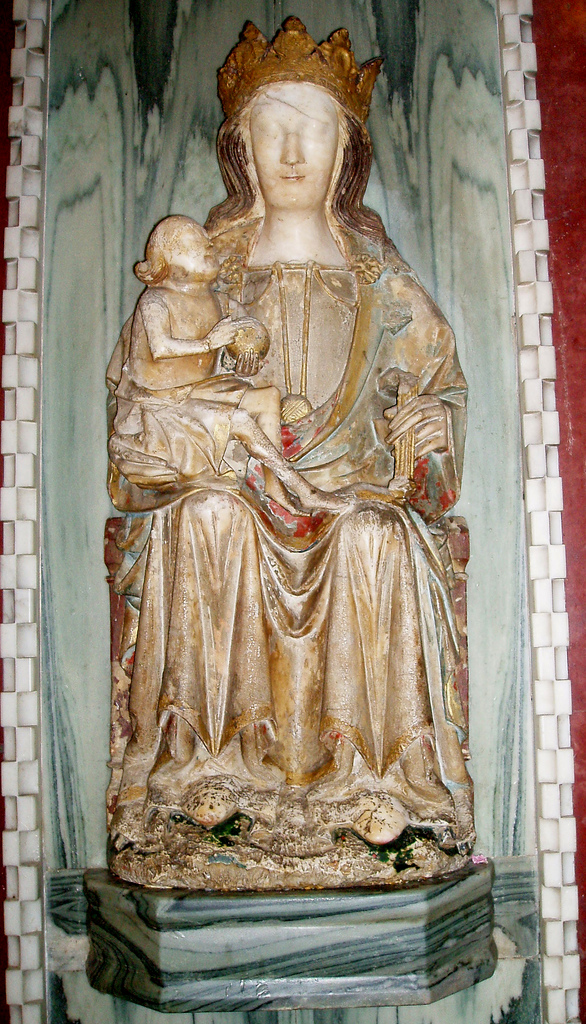
Our Lady of Westminster, Westminster Cathedral

Our Lady of Westminster is a late medieval statue of the Madonna and child, now placed at the entrance of the Lady Chapel in Westminster Cathedral, London, under the thirteenth Station of the Cross. The image is an English alabaster, flat backed, 36 inches (91 cm) high, and depicts the Virgin Mary enthroned with the Christ child on her right knee. Mary is crowned and holds a sceptre (now broken) in her left hand, the Christ child looks up at her and holds a globe with one hand, whilst with the other he blesses it. The statue is one of the greatest treasures of the cathedral, and the oldest item housed in the 19th-century foundation.

Most experts in the field agree that the image was carved in the Nottingham area in about 1450 from alabaster mined at nearby Chellaston, but the intervening 500 years until 1954, when the statue was found and bought in Paris by the dealer S. W. Wolsey, are a blank.

The name Our Lady of Westminster might also refer to other traditions and devotions relating to the much older Westminster Abbey nearby.

== History ==
Throughout the period of their production, Nottingham alabaster images were hugely popular in Europe and were exported in large quantities, some ending up as far afield as Iceland, Croatia and Poland. But by the far the greatest market for these images was in France, where even today some churches retain in situ their English alabaster altarpieces. The trade continued up to and beyond the Reformation with the English ambassador to France reporting in January 1550 that three English ships had arrived laden with religious images to be sold in Rouen, Paris and beyond, this a year after Edward VI's Putting away of Books and Images Act 1549. It appears, therefore, that the statue of Our Lady of Westminster was exported to France some time between 1450 and 1550. It is much larger than most English alabaster work; the commonest surviving alabasters are thin panels carved in high relief from series covering the Passion or the Life of Christ which were framed and mounted as altarpieces.

The discovery in 1863 of a headless but stylistically almost identical alabaster image, buried in the churchyard of All Saints' Broughton-in Craven suggests that, as was apparently usually the case, the statue was a standard model repeated several times by the workshop and probably produced for stock rather than upon receipt of a particular commission. Exports, as of the better documented contemporary export trade in icons of the Cretan school, were usually made in bulk for sale to dealers who then found buyers locally.

It appears that the statue remained in its French shrine until the upheaval of the French Revolution when much ecclesiastical property was destroyed and dispersed. It then passed into private collections and is noted as having been in the collection of Baron de St Leger Daguerre, from whence it was put up for sale in 1954 at the Exhibition des Chefs d'oeuvre de la Curiosite du Monde. It was there that the dealer S. W. Wolsey saw and purchased it and it then came to the attention of Cardinal Griffin and the Dean of York Minster. A minor bidding war ensued which Cardinal Griffin won. The statue was then enthroned in Westminster Cathedral on 8 December 1955 to the accompaniment of the choir singing the Salve Regina.

In 1963, whilst on a trip to Italy, the Westminster Choir school presented a copy of the statue of Our Lady of Westminster and a booklet explaining the devotion to Pope John XXIII.

== Original appearance ==
The statue still retains enough of its polychromy to ascertain its original appearance. The throne was coloured an ochre red with the knobs being picked out in gilt, the cloak was dark blue with the inner folds red. The ground beneath Mary's feet was a characteristic dark green scattered with red and white daisies and her crown, sceptre, mantle fastenings and the Christ child's hair were all gilded. These bright colours were characteristic of Nottingham Alabaster since they, for the most part, were designed to be housed in wooden altarpieces with painted shutters and to be seen by candlelight in dimly lit churches. The fact that the statue is flat backed and almost bas relief in places makes it likely that it was intended for just such an altarpiece.

== Westminster Abbey and the "Dowry of Mary" ==
The first evidence of the title "Dowry of Mary" comes from the will of the Countess of Pembroke who in 1377 established a mortuary chapel so that daily Masses could be sung for her husband, next to the Chapel of St John in Westminster Abbey, and presented the Abbot of Westminster with an alabaster statue of the Virgin Mary. Soon after this the cultus of Mary in Westminster received royal impetus through Richard II.

Jean Froissart gives a vivid description of the manner in which the young King Richard II of England, during the 1381 Peasants' Revolt, prepared to meet the rebels, led by Wat Tyler, at Smithfield: "Richard II on the Saturday after Corpus Christi went to Westminster, where he heard Mass at the Abbey with all his Lords. He made his devotions at a statue of Our Lady in a little chapel that had witnessed many miracles and where much grace had been gained, so that the Kings of England have much faith in it."

Another chronicler, Strype, described the event thus: "On the coming of the rebels and Wat Tyler, the same King went to Westminster . . . confessed himself to an anchorite; then took himself to the chapel of Our Lady of Pew; there he said his devotions, and went to Smithfield to meet the rebels."

The outcome of the meeting was favourable with Wat Tyler throwing down his arms and taking up the King's colours. Naturally the King and Court regarded this as a miracle wrought by the Holy Virgin, and therefore set about encouraging her veneration at Westminster. After his success in quelling the rebels, and their acceptance of the standard of the realm, Richard returned to meet his mother at Westminster and to give thanks. Froissart records the young King's words as follows: "Yes, Madam . . . rejoice and praise God, for today I have regained my kingdom which I had lost." And he placed the Kingdom under Our Lady's protection - in thanksgiving for having regained it.

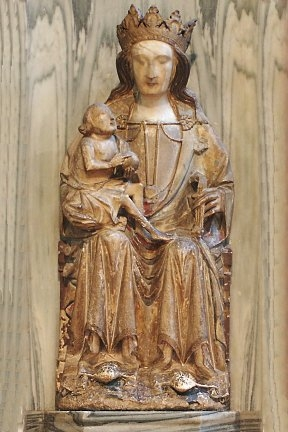
Dos tua Virgo pia Haec est, quaere leges O Maria, This is your Dowry, O Holy Virgin, therefore rule over it, O Mary

It is Richard who refurbished the Chapel of Our Lady of Pew in the abbey, and commissioned the Wilton Diptych which shows him placing himself and England (signified by the banner with a George Cross and a miniature representation of England) under the Virgin Mary's protection. Furthermore, at the special desire of the king, this mandate was issued at Lambeth on 10 February 1399 and reads as follows: "The contemplation of the great mystery of the Incarnation has brought all Christian nations to venerate her from whom came the beginnings of redemption. But we, as the humble servants of her inheritance, and liegemen of her especial dower - as we are approved by common parlance ought to excel all others in the favour of our praises and devotions to her."

Just as the Countess's alabaster statue replaced an earlier image, so now Our Lady of Westminster becomes a link to the Dowry tradition, that started in Westminster and radiated throughout pre-Reformation England.

== Our Lady of Pew ==
The statue Our Lady of Pew in Westminster Abbey was created by Sister Concordia Scott OSB, of Minster Abbey near Ramsgate in Kent. Sculpted of alabaster, the statue of the Virgin and Child stands in the niche of the Chapel of Our Lady of Pew. The statue was enthroned in the Pew Chapel on 10 May 1971. The original statue here had disappeared centuries ago. The design of the 20th-century piece was inspired by the 15th-century English alabaster Madonna at Westminster Cathedral.

== Gallery ==
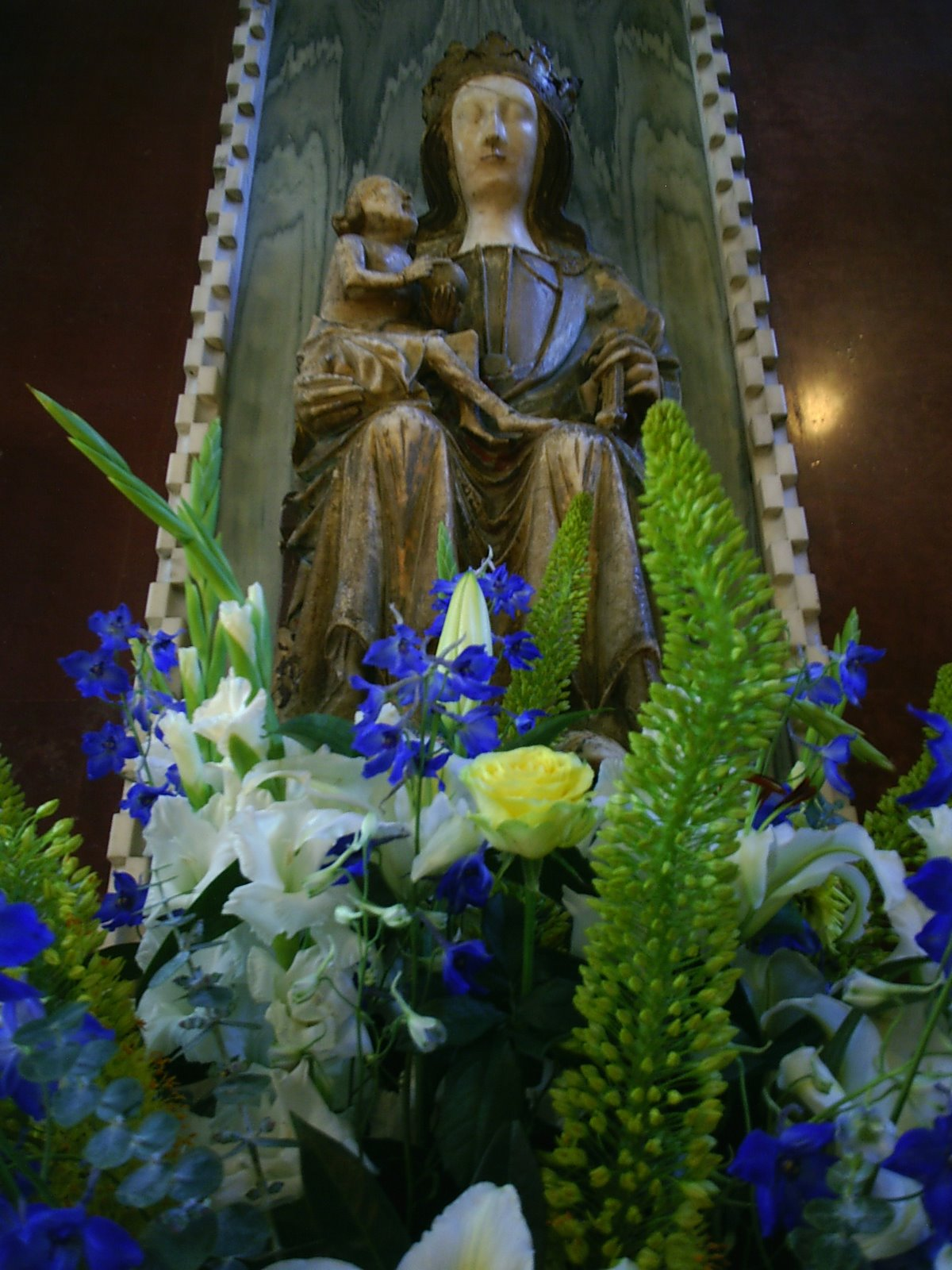

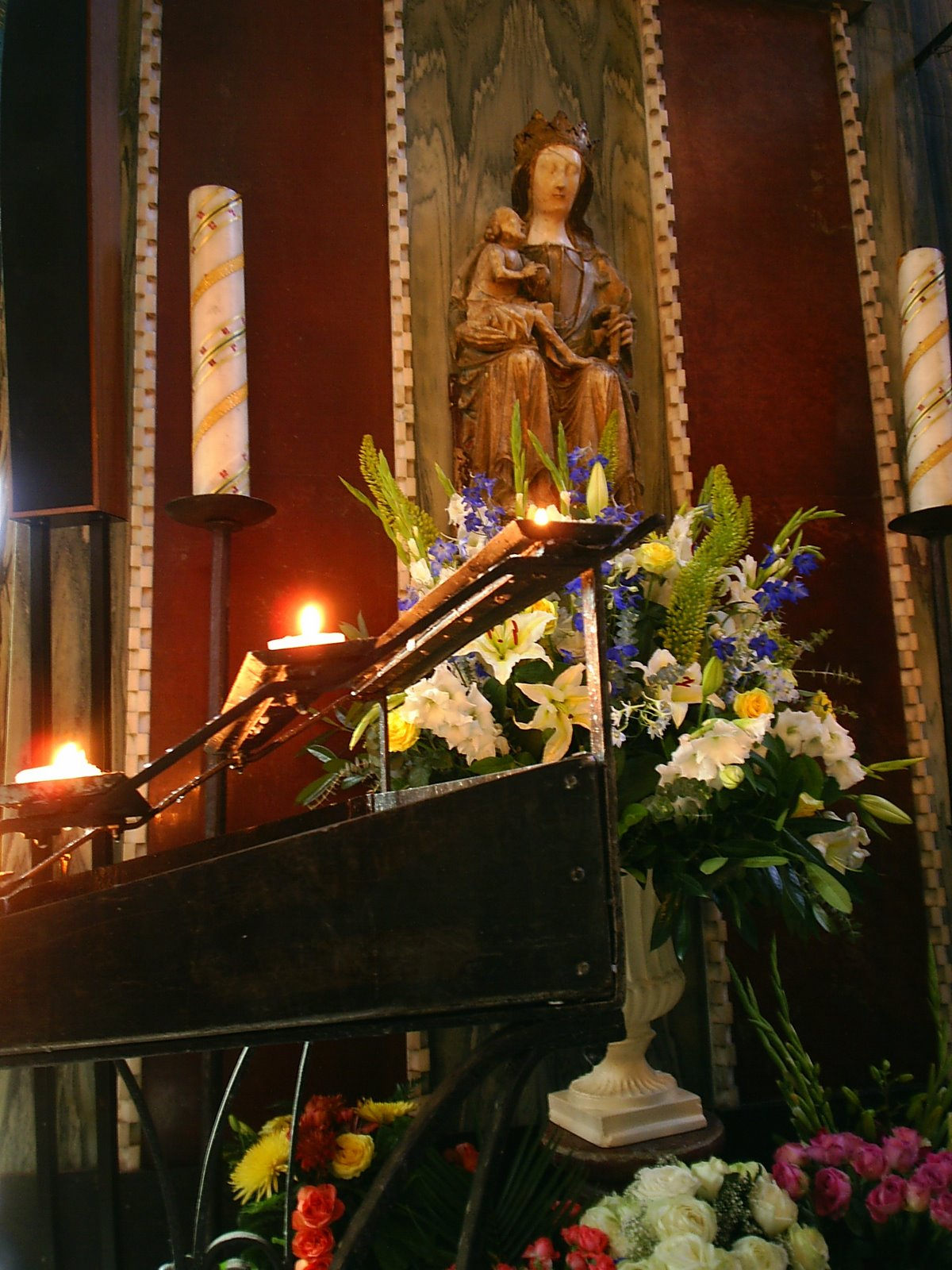

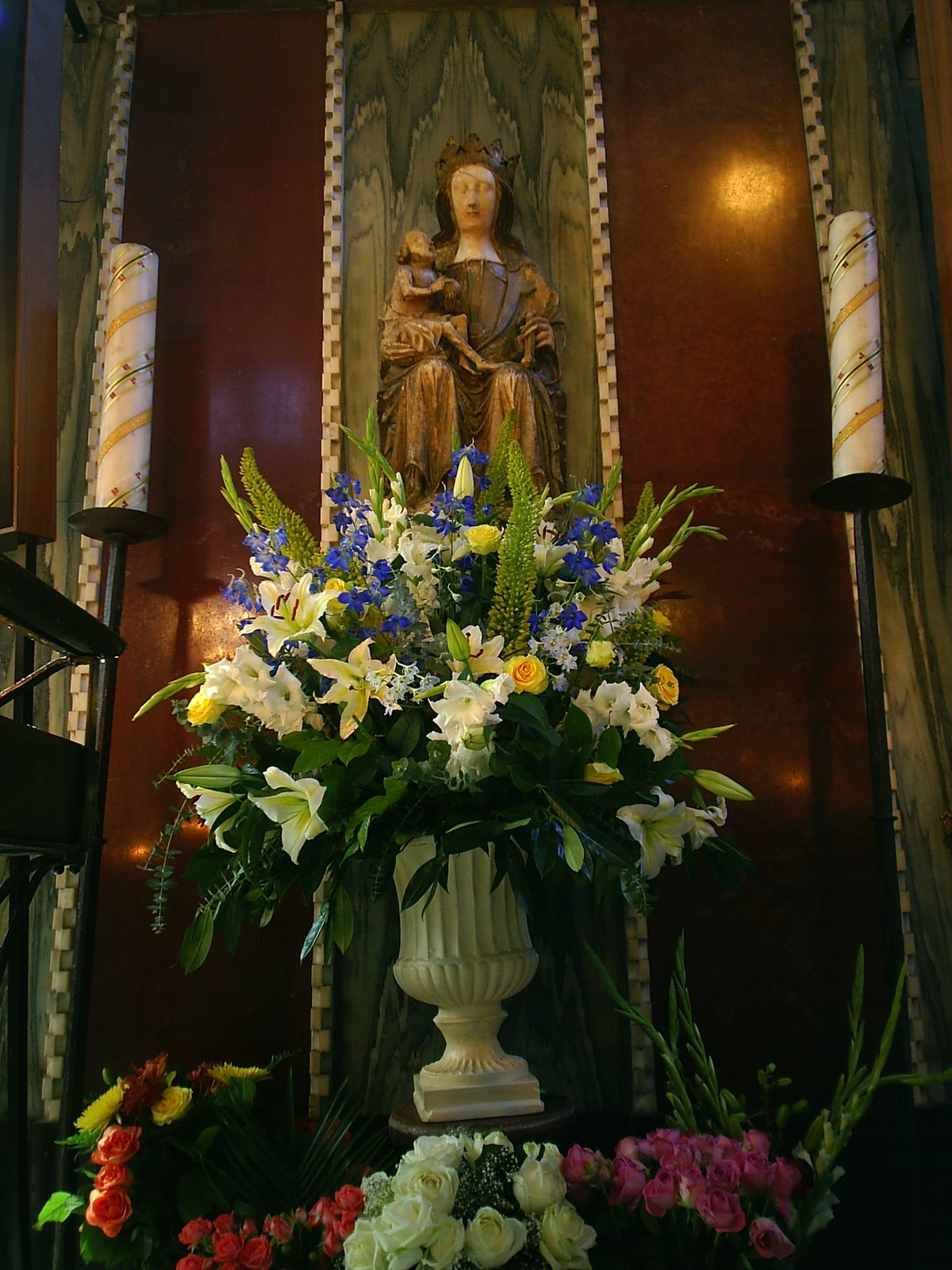

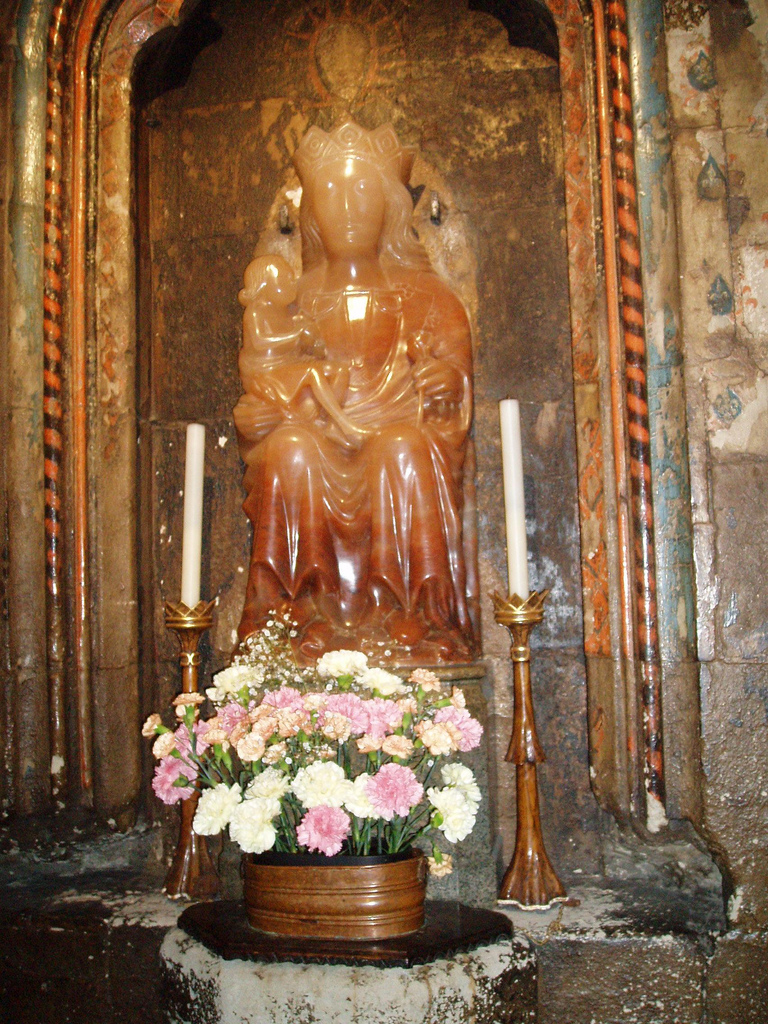
A copy of Our Lady of Westminster by Sister Concordia Scott enshrined as "Our Lady of Pew" in Westminster Abbey

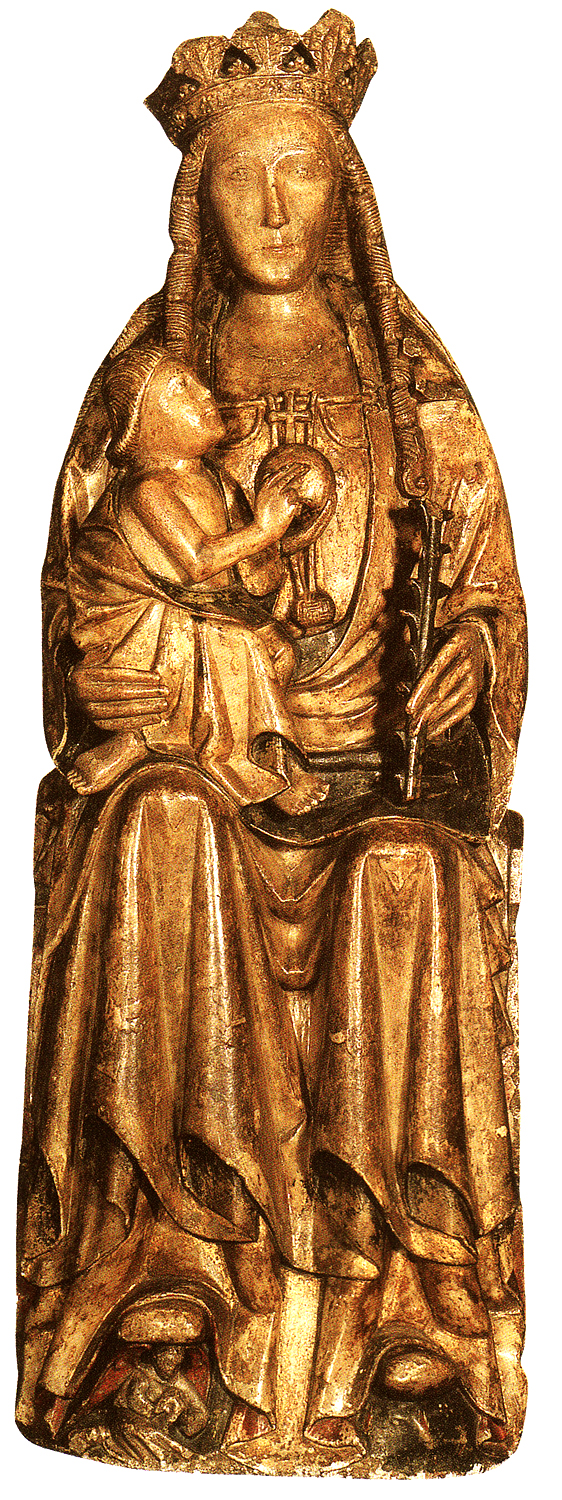
A comparable English alabaster carving of the Virgin & Child from the British Museum

== See also ==
- Our Lady of Ipswich
- Our Lady of Walsingham
- Our Lady of Cardigan
- Our Lady of Doncaster
- Our Lady of Willesden
- Nottingham Alabaster
- Roman Catholic Church in England and Wales

== Bibliography ==
Catholic Trivia, Our Forgotten Heritage, HarperCollins, 1992

Shrines of Our Lady in England, Anne Vail, Gracewing Publishing, 2004

English Medieval Alabasters (with a catalogue of the collection in the Victoria and Albert Museum), Francis Cheetham, Second Edition, The Boydell Press, 2005.

Our Lady Of Westminster, H. M. Gillett, Thomas Of Fleet Street Ltd, 1956
