= Father Abraham =

Father Abraham may refer to:

- Abraham, the first of the biblical patriarchs
- Father Abraham, pen name of American statesman Benjamin Franklin, under which he wrote The Way to Wealth
- Father Abraham, stage name of Dutch singer Pierre Kartner, associated with the Smurfs
- Father Abraham, nickname of Armenian politician and agricultural scientist Avetik Sahakyan

== Music ==
- "Father Abraham" a biblical campfire song, recorded by Lisa Loeb on her album Camp Lisa
- "Father Abraham" a track by Red Krayola released as a 12" single and also on their album Hazel

== Books ==
- Father Abraham, a 1909 book by Ida Tarbell
- In the Footsteps of our Father Abraham, a 1993 book published by Musalaha
- Our Father Abraham: Jewish Roots of the Christian Faith, Eerdmans, 1989, by Marvin R. Wilson

== See also ==
- "We Are Coming, Father Abra'am", an American Civil War poem.
- Penitence of Origen
