= Nailloux Altarpiece =

Nailloux altarpiece
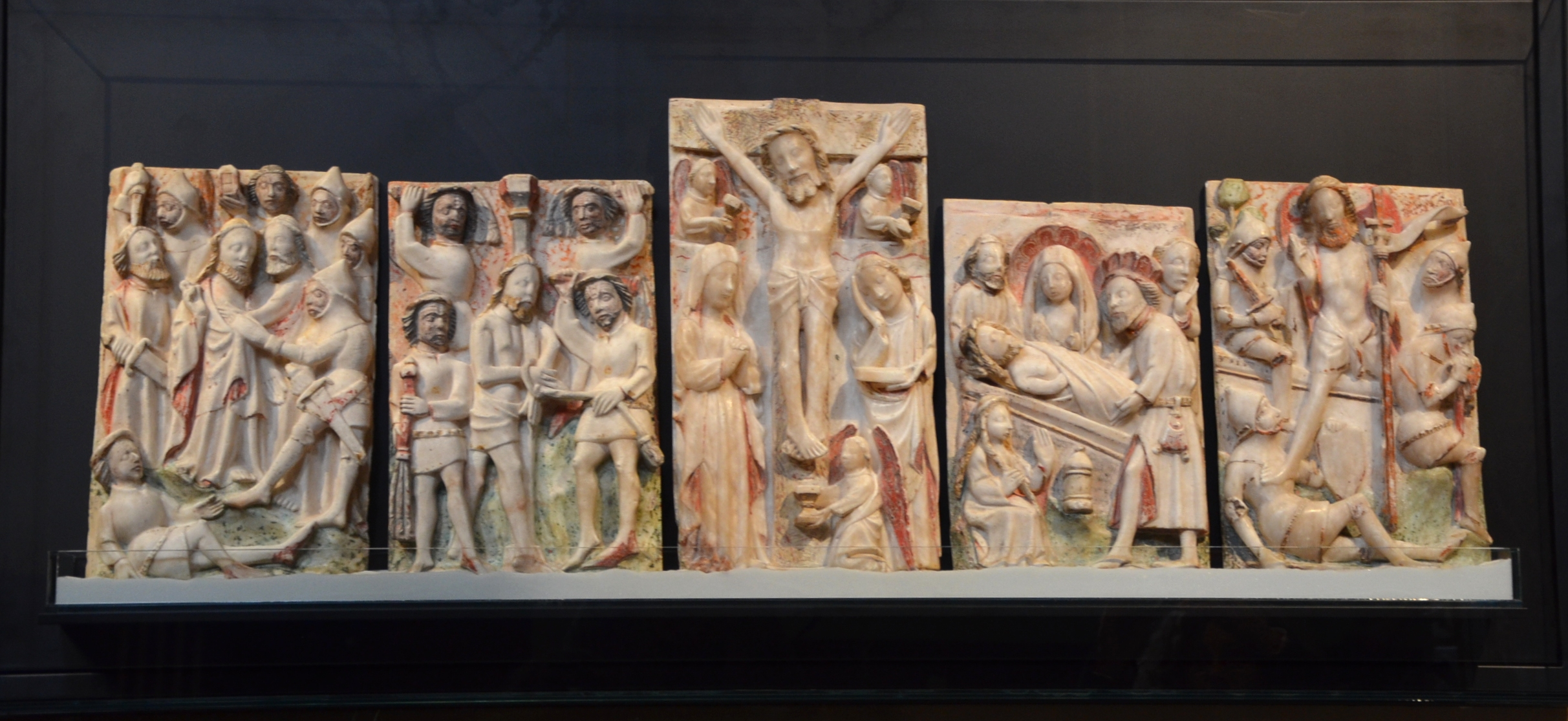
- Artist: Unknown
- Year: Circa 1450–1500
- Type: Nottingham alabaster
- Dimensions: 25 cm × 146 cm (9.8 in × 57 in)
- Location: Église Saint-Martin, Nailloux

The Nailloux altarpiece (French: Retable de Nailloux) embodies the artistic style of France during the medieval era. The Nailloux consisted of five alabaster panels carved in high relief, this retable was made in dedication to the Passion of Jesus Christ. It is currently conserved in a chapel of St Martin's Church in Nailloux, in the Haute-Garonne department in southwestern France.

The retable is a typical product of the Nottingham alabaster industry. This piece was carved during the second half of the 15th century, at a Midlands workshop in England. These were cheaper than alternative forms of sculpted altarpiece, and many of this kind were exported. The work was produced in a period of economic development for the region: the golden age of woad culture in Lauragais.

With a total length of 1.46 m (57 in), the altarpiece is made of four side panels of 43 × 25 cm (18 x 9 in) and a bigger central panel of 50 × 25 cm (19 x 9 in).

The Passion of Christ is the most common subject in medieval altarpieces because of its importance to christians. It shows the sacrifice of Christ, commemorated in the Eucharist. The Nailloux altarpiece represents, from left to right: the Arrest, the Flagellation, the Crucifixion (main panel), the Entombment and the Resurrection of Christ.

The neighboring church of Montgeard also houses four panels of a dismembered Nottingham alabaster altarpiece (probably dedicated to the Life of the Virgin).

The Nailloux Altarpiece has been classified "Monument historique" as an objet since 1914. Following the renovation of the church in 2011, the altarpiece was restored in 2013, following a subscription to the Fondation du Patrimoine.

== See also ==
- Gothic sculpture
- Nottingham alabaster

== Bibliography ==
- Cheetham Francis, English medieval alabaster: with a catalogue of the collection in the Victoria and Albert Museum, Woodbridge, UK New York, Boydell Press in association with the Association for Cultural Exchange, 2005, 2nd édition.
- Gorguet Pascale, Répertoire des albâtres anglais du XIVe au XVe siècle dans le Sud-Ouest: mémoire de maîtrise présenté sous la direction des professeurs Yves Bruand et Michèle Pradalier, Université Toulouse Le Mirail, 1984.
