= Concordia Scott =

Scottish sculptor and Benedictine nun

- Born: Caroline Scott; 15 March 1924; Glasgow, Scotland
- Died: 5 February 2014 (aged 89); St Mildred's Priory, Minster-in-Thanet, Kent, England
- Education: Edinburgh College of Art

Sister Concordia Scott (1924 – 2014) was a Scottish sculptor and Benedictine nun, of the Minster Abbey community, Minster-in-Thanet, Kent. Her commissioned works have included statues for Westminster Abbey, Canterbury Cathedral, Coventry Cathedral and the National Shrine of Wales as well as numerous sculptures currently in Europe and the United States of America.

== Early life and education ==
Caroline Scott was born in Glasgow on 15 March 1924. She gained a scholarship to the Edinburgh College of Art aged 17, but her studies were interrupted by the war. She joined the Auxiliary Territorial Service and served in the 93rd Searchlight Regiment, the only one in the world entirely staffed by women, and was based in Wimbledon, London. At the end of the war, she completed her studies in Edinburgh, gaining her Diploma in 1950, and became a commercial artist.

In 1954 she entered the Benedictine community in Minster Abbey, Kent, taking Concordia as her name, and was professed on 22 August 1955. She continued to sculpt, entering a piece for the Manchester Vocations Exhibition in 1959, which led to numerous commissions for sculptures in the following 40 years. Her work can now be seen in cathedrals and churches across the world. She was Prioress of the Minster Abbey community 1984-1999.

== Selected works ==
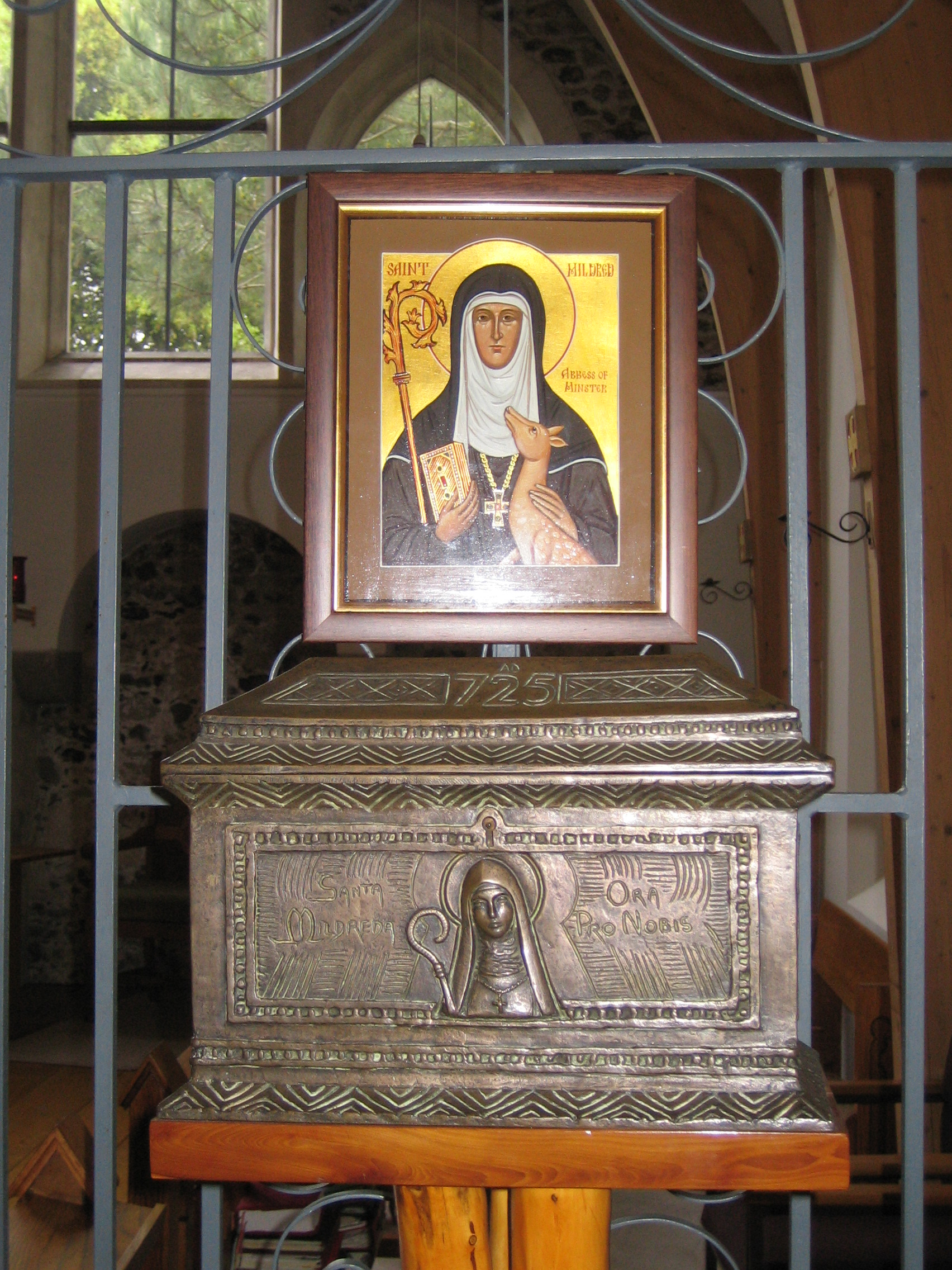
Bronze casket for St Mildred's relics in Minster Abbey

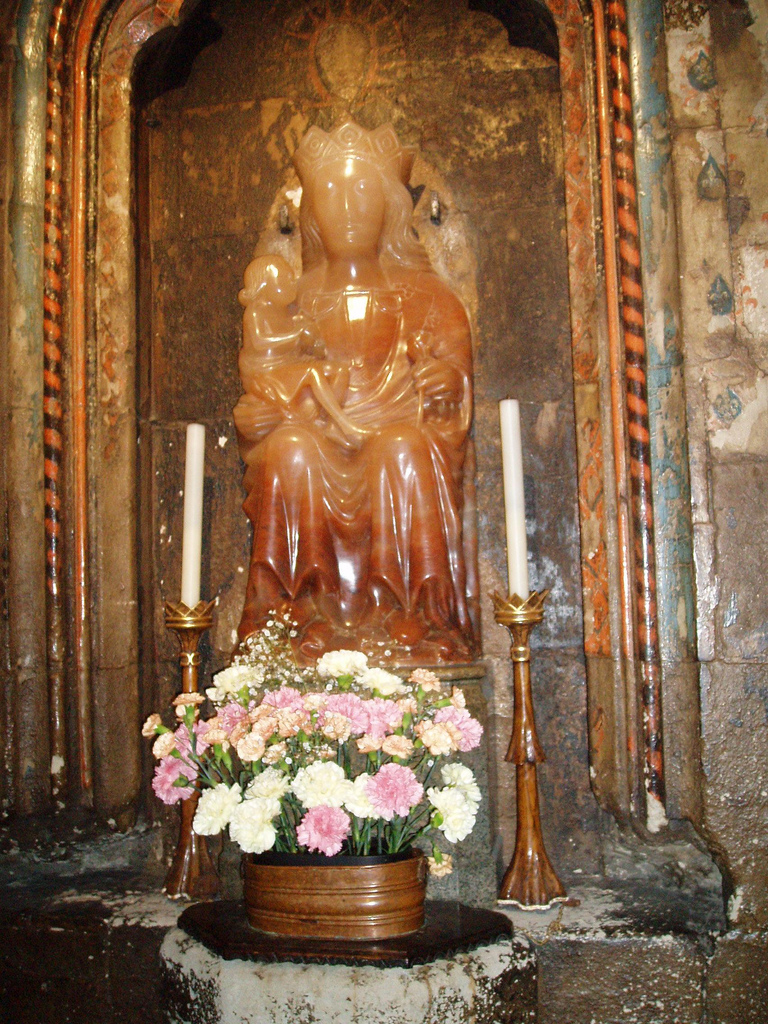
Our Lady of the Pewe, Westminster Abbey

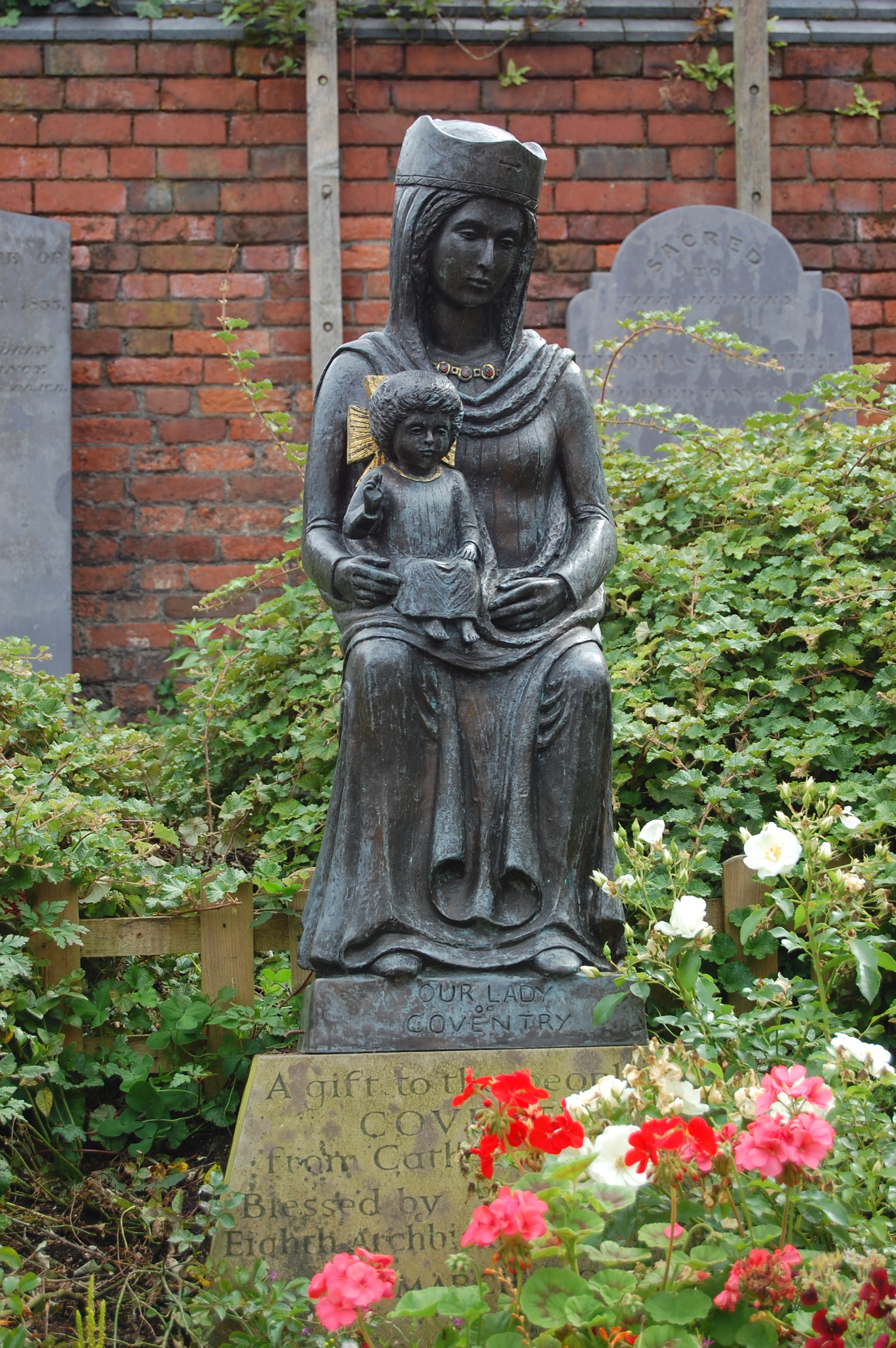
Statue of Our Lady of Coventry located in Priory Gardens

- Bronze casket for St Mildred's relics, Minster Abbey, Minster-in-Thanet, Kent. 1955
- Our Lady of the Pewe: 3 foot high alabaster statue, Westminster Abbey, London. The statue was commissioned to restore the old medieval shrine of Our Lady of Pew which had been destroyed during the Dissolution of the Monasteries. The new statue, unveiled in the Pew Chapel on 10 May 1971, was based on a similar fourteenth century statue in Westminster Cathedral and carved from English alabaster. 1971
- Our Lady of the Undercroft: 3 foot 6 inches, bronze, Canterbury Cathedral, Kent. 1982. The statue of Mary is crowned and on a throne, holding a figure of the infant Christ. Behind his head is a gilt Canterbury cross. The original statue in the 14th-century shrine, is believed to have been destroyed during the Reformation, and a 17th-century replacement, made of ivory by a Portuguese artist, was later stolen.
- Our Lady of 5th Avenue: a bronze statue of Mary and the infant Jesus, for St Thomas Episcopal Church, Fifth Avenue, New York. 1989
- Our Lady of the Taper for the Welsh national shrine, also known as Our Lady of Cardigan, Wales. 1986
- Our Lady of Coventry: 2001, installed in the ruins of St Mary's Priory
