= Bosom of Abraham Trinity =

Motif in medieval English religious art

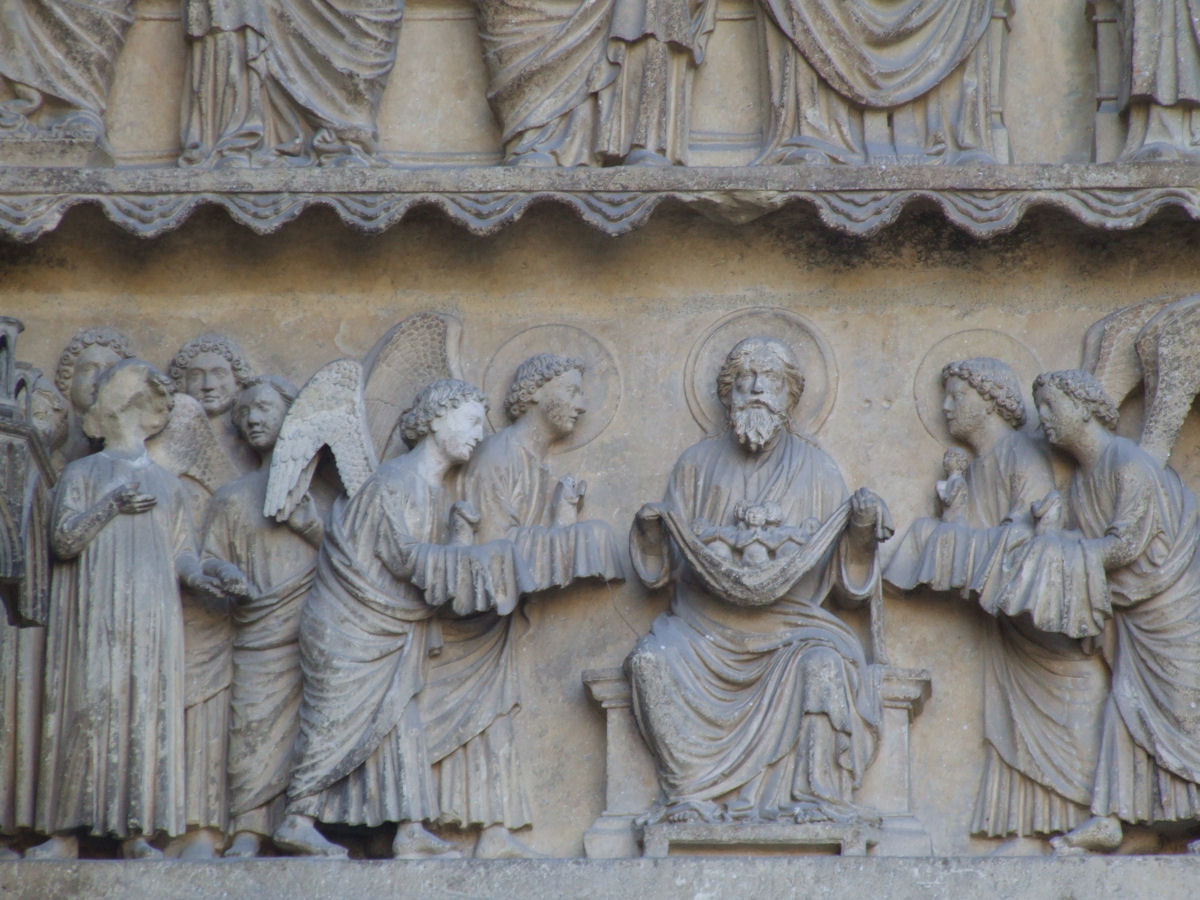
Abraham holding little figures of souls in a cloth, as angels bring additional figures. Reims Cathedral

The Bosom of Abraham Trinity, also known as the Trinity with souls, is a rare iconography apparently unique to English medieval alabaster sculpture, of which only twelve examples are known to have survived, although there were undoubtedly many more made. They adapt an earlier convention where a figure of Abraham himself held tiny figures of souls in a cloth between his hands representing the Bosom of Abraham.

In a composition showing the "Throne of Mercy" type of the Trinity, a group of tiny figures are seen in a cloth or "napkin" held or supported between the hands of God the Father. These represent the souls of the saved. There are five examples of free-standing statues known, in the Burrell Collection Museum in Glasgow, the Museum of Fine Arts, Boston and elsewhere, and seven high relief panels. The Burrel statue is 89 cm tall, and the Boston one 95 cm. The panels are presumably the usual size for such works, typically 40 x 25 cm, perhaps larger if they are the central panel in an altarpiece group. Both terms for the subject are the invention of modern art historians.

In the Boston figure, dated 1420–50, nine "souls" are seen, in two rows, with a king and bishop in the centre of the top row, distinguishable by their crown and mitre. The napkin is not held by God, whose two hands are raised in a blessing gesture; it seems tied around the souls and to rest on God's lap. Male and female donor figures with banderoles kneel beside God's feet; they are at an intermediate scale between God and the souls. The Burrell figure, dated as 14th century, also has nine "souls" but the figures themselves are apparently restored; God holds an end of the napkin in either hand.

There were earlier images, common in the great French Gothic cathedrals of the 13th century, illustrating Abraham himself with small souls represented as children in his cloak, or held in a napkin in the same way as in the alabasters. By "about the early fourteenth century" such images ceased to be "theologically acceptable", though it seems this news had not reached Cornwall by the early 16th century, when a stained glass Abraham with a napkin of souls was installed in the parish church at St Neot, Cornwall (picture below).

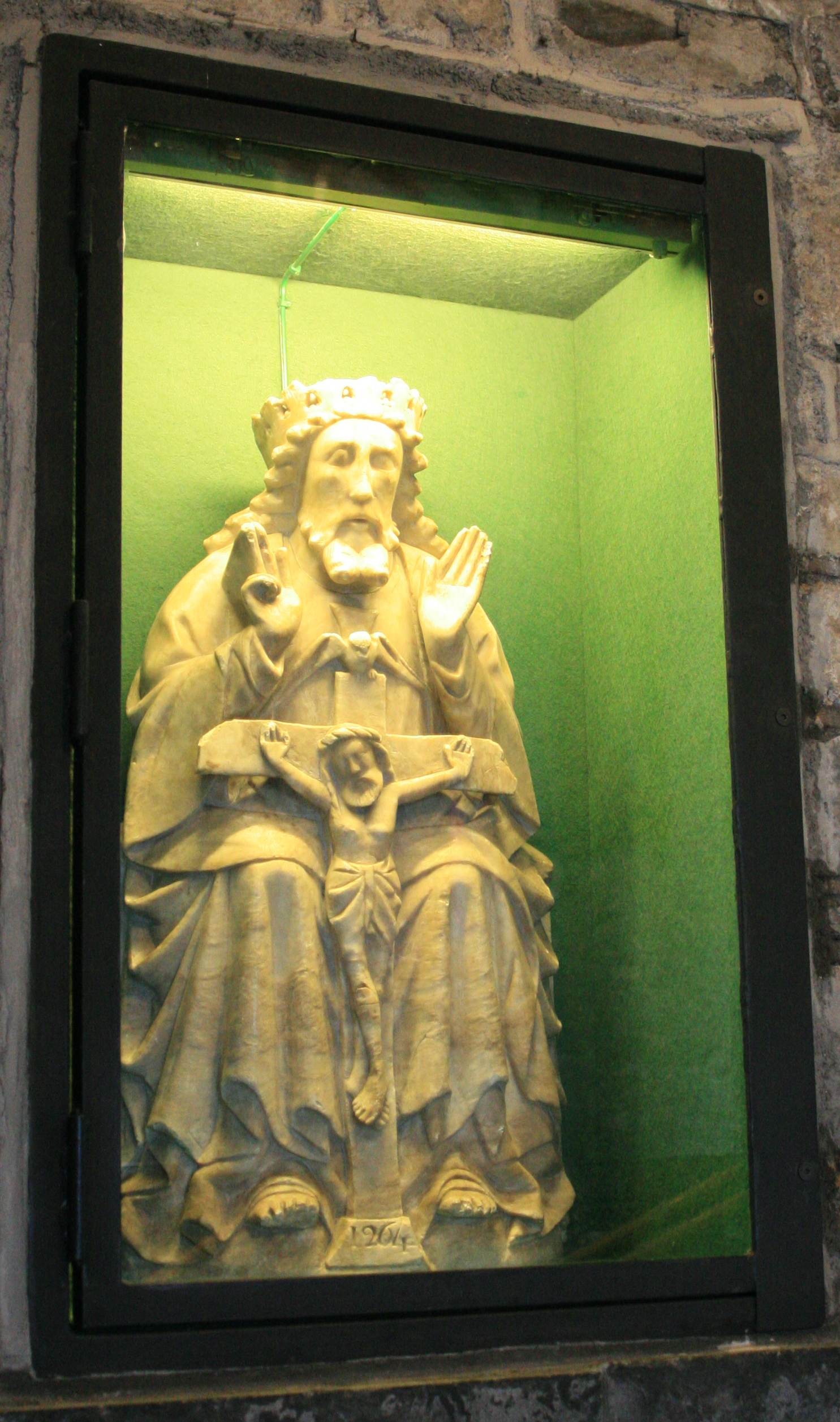
Conventional Throne of Mercy English alabaster statue of the Trinity. See below for links to images of the Bosom of Abraham Trinity type.

In a detached miniature of about 1150, from a work of Hildegard of Bingen, a figure usually described as "Synagogue", of youngish appearance with closed eyes, holds a group, with Moses carrying the Tablets above the others, held in the large figure's folded arms.

In addition, the theme combines elements of the Western Virgin of Mercy and the Russian Pokrov icons, though these are not necessarily direct influences. It was probably associated with the feast of All Saints, and used on altars with this dedication. In the Virgin of Mercy, a standing Mary spreads her cloak wide, sheltering a crowd of figures, representing the living. In the Pokrov icons, she holds a small "veil" in her hands in a similar gesture to the Burrell figure, but this represents the vision of a Byzantine saint, where she spread her veil over the world as a protection.

Although no examples of the Bosom of Abraham Trinity have survived in other media, they probably once existed. English alabasters were exported across Europe and have survived in relatively large numbers on the Continent, especially France, while other publicly displayed artistic media from the period have mostly been destroyed since the Protestant Reformation. The English alabaster industry is a rather unlikely place for such a bold iconographic innovation in contemporary terms, since it concentrated on turning out large numbers of standard figures and sets of panels that closely followed more high-status forms of art in their iconography.

The type was first published in 1933 by the art historian Walter Leo Hildburgh, the leading authority on, and collector of, English alabasters.

== Notes ==
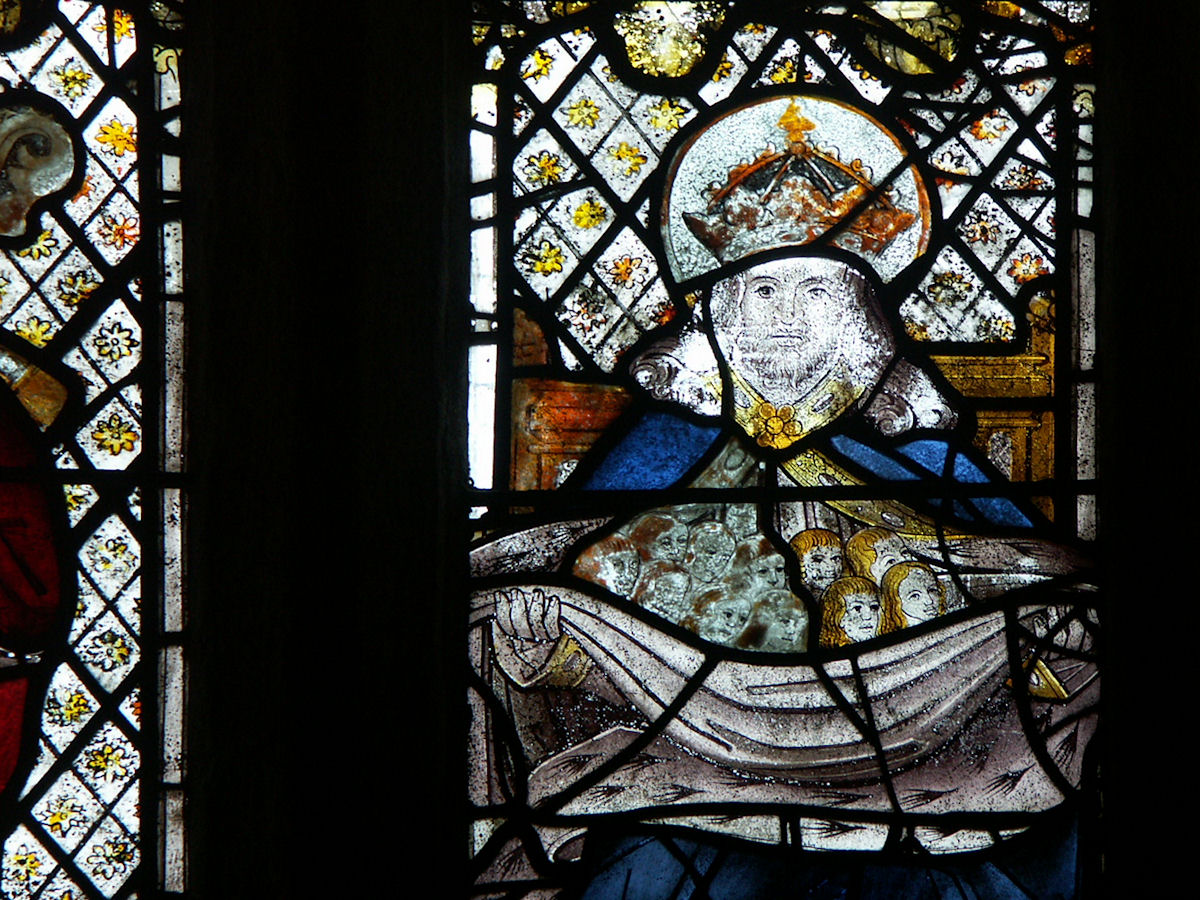
The Bosom of Abraham, stained glass of the early 16th century, St Neot, Cornwall.
