= Nottingham alabaster =

Alabaster religious carvings made in England in the 1300s–1500s

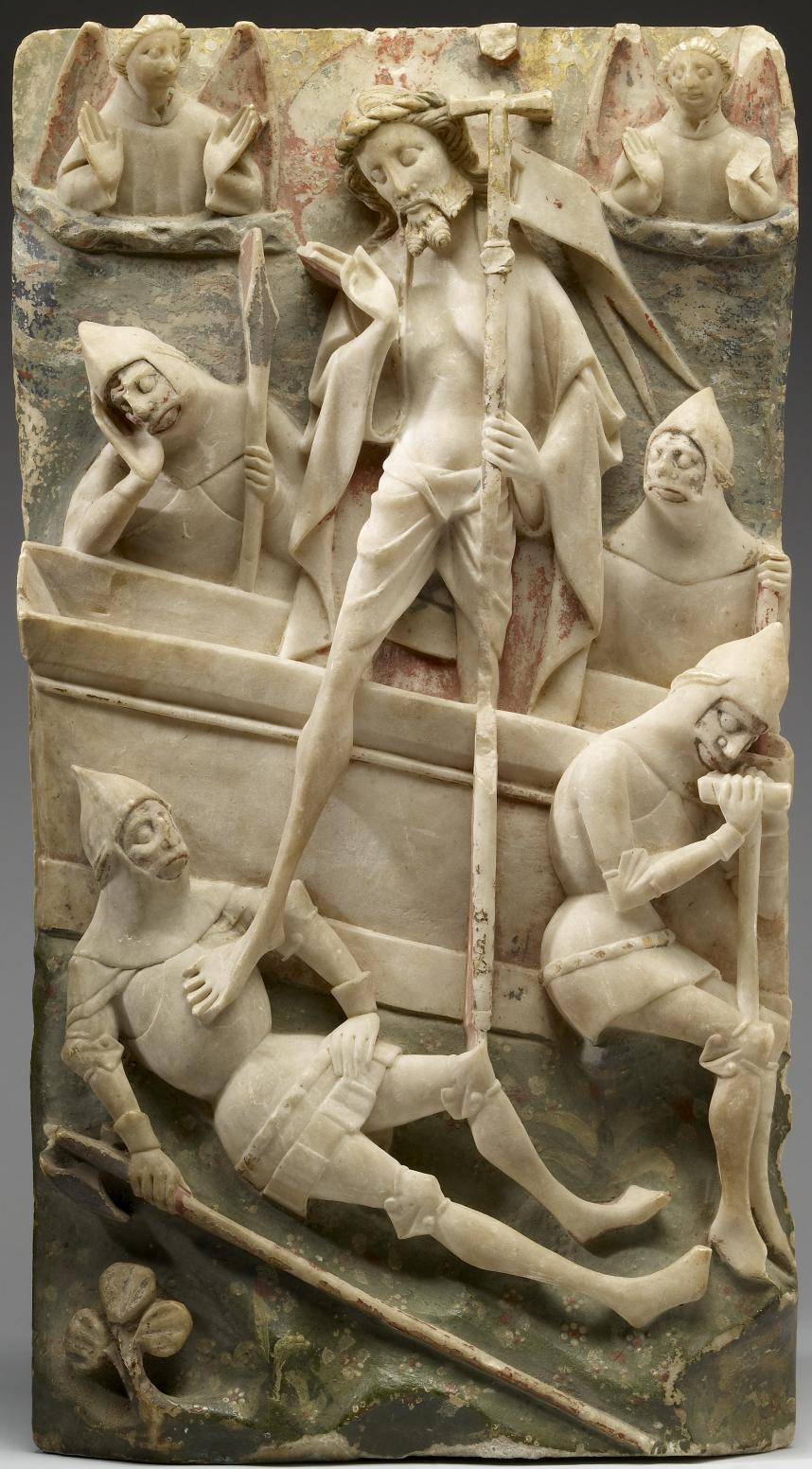
Resurrection of Christ, panel from an altarpiece set, 1450–90, with remains of the paint

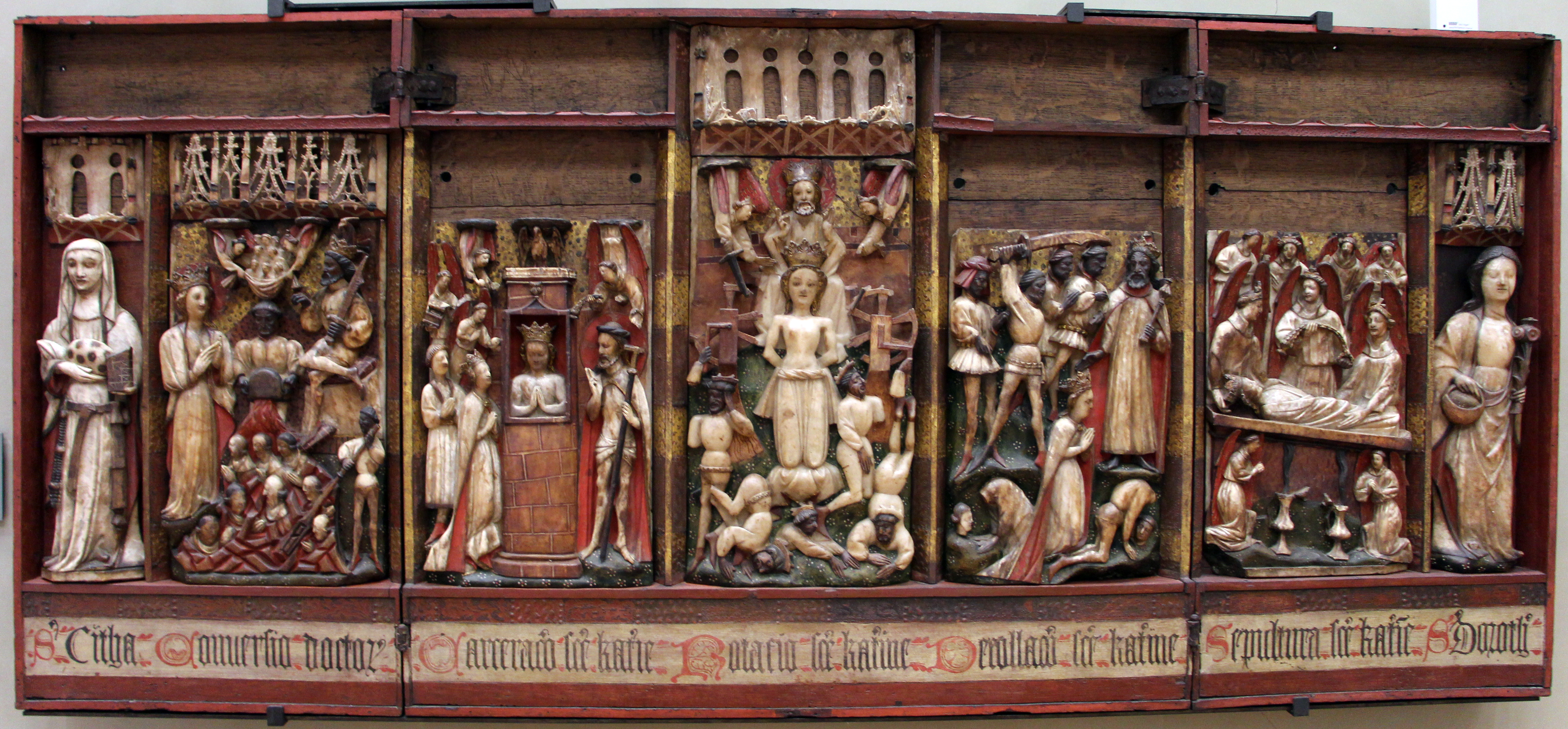
Fifteenth-century altarpiece set, with contemporary frame and well-preserved paint

Nottingham alabaster is a term used to refer to the English sculpture industry, mostly of relatively small religious carvings, which flourished from the fourteenth century until the early sixteenth century. Alabaster carvers were at work in London, York and Burton-on-Trent, and many probably worked very close to the rural mines, but the largest concentration was around Nottingham. This has led to all the English medieval output being referred to as "Nottingham alabaster".

Alabaster, a mineral composed of gypsum and various impurities, is much softer and easier to work than marble and a good material for mass production, though not suitable for outdoor use. Carvings were made as single figures, assemblies for tomb monuments, including full length effigies, but the most common survivals are panels, up to about 20 inches or 50 cm high, from sets for altarpieces, which could be transported relatively easily, and fitted into a locally made architectural surround of stone or wood on arrival at their destination. These were attractive for less wealthy churches, and for the private chapels of the nobility. Some complete ensembles survive, showing varied numbers of panels; the dimensions of the Nativity illustrated are typical. The subjects were the same as in painted altarpieces, often including short cycles of the Life of Christ, especially the Passion of Christ, or the Life of the Virgin. Since the sets were probably generally not made to a specific commission, unlike paintings, there are fewer local or patron saints.

Throughout the period of their production Nottingham alabaster images were hugely popular in Europe and were exported in large quantities, some ending up as far afield as Iceland, Croatia and Poland. But by far the greatest export market for these images was in France, where even today some churches retain in situ their English alabaster altarpieces, unlike England, where survivals are extremely rare. The sculptures were normally brightly painted, sometimes all over, sometimes partially, but much of the paint has often been lost, and many pieces have had the rest completely removed by dealers, collectors or museums in the past. Most alabaster altarpieces and religious carvings other than church monuments remaining in England were destroyed in the English Reformation, after which the many workshops had to change their products to concentrate on church monuments.

== History ==
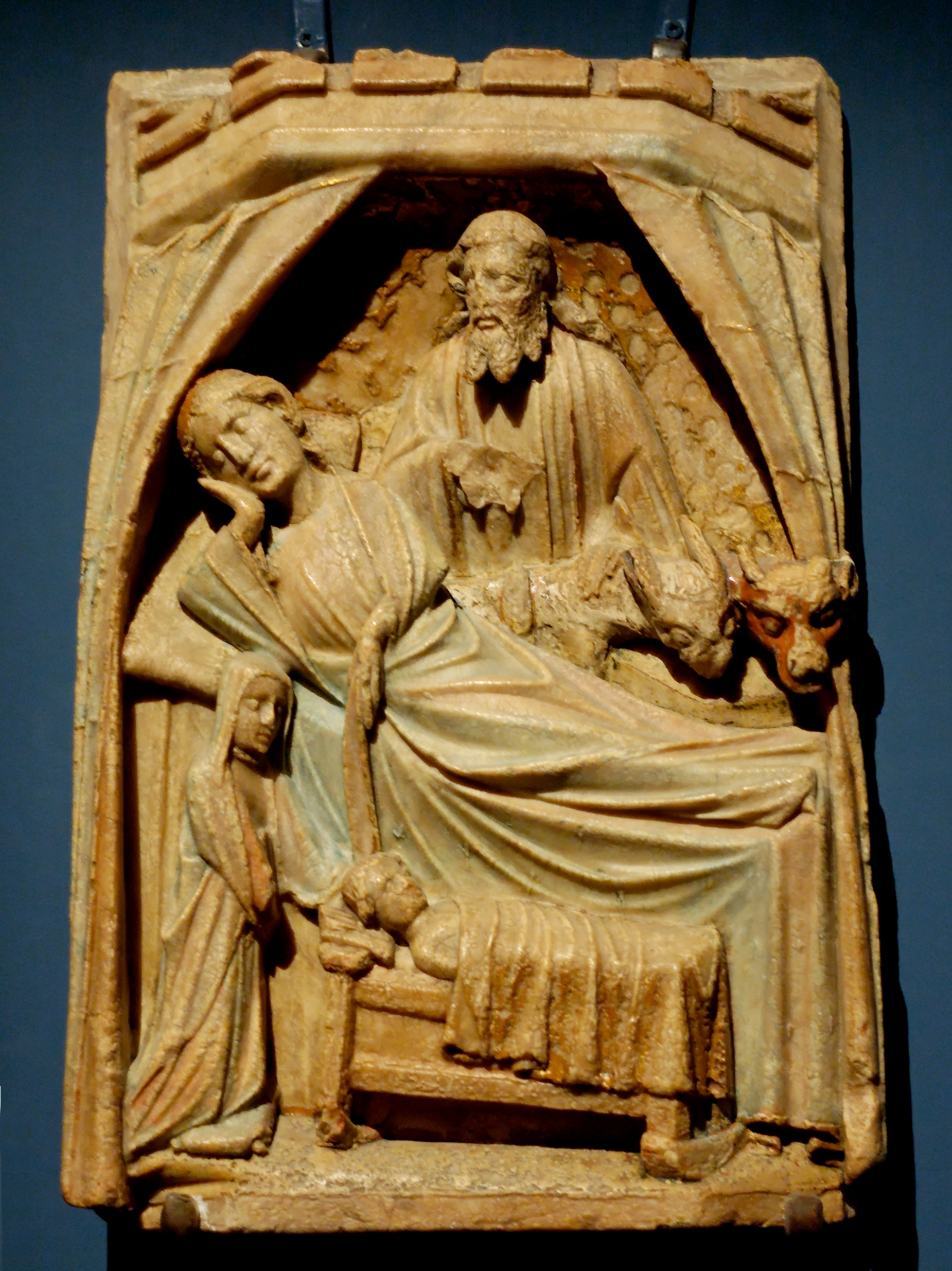
Nativity panel, ca 1400, using a composition previously found in French ivories. H. 37.5 cm (14 3/4 in.), W. 26 cm (10 in.), D. 4.5 cm (1 3/4 in.)

The alabaster used in the industry was quarried largely in the area around South Derbyshire near Tutbury and Chellaston. The craftsmen were known by various names such as alabastermen, kervers, marblers, and image-makers.

The tomb of John of Eltham, Earl of Cornwall, who died in 1334, in Westminster Abbey, is an early example, of very high quality. On 6 June 1371, payment was made to Peter Maceon of Nottingham, "of the balance of 300 marks for a table [altar piece] of alabaster made by him and placed upon the High Altar within the free Chapel of Saint George of Windsor." The execution of this order cost £200 and required 10 carts, 80 horses, and 20 men to transport it to its destination. The journey occupied seventeen days in the autumn of 1367, and the expenses of transport amounted to £30. The church at Tong, Shropshire, contains an especially fine sequence of tombs of the Vernon family spanning the 15th and 16th centuries.

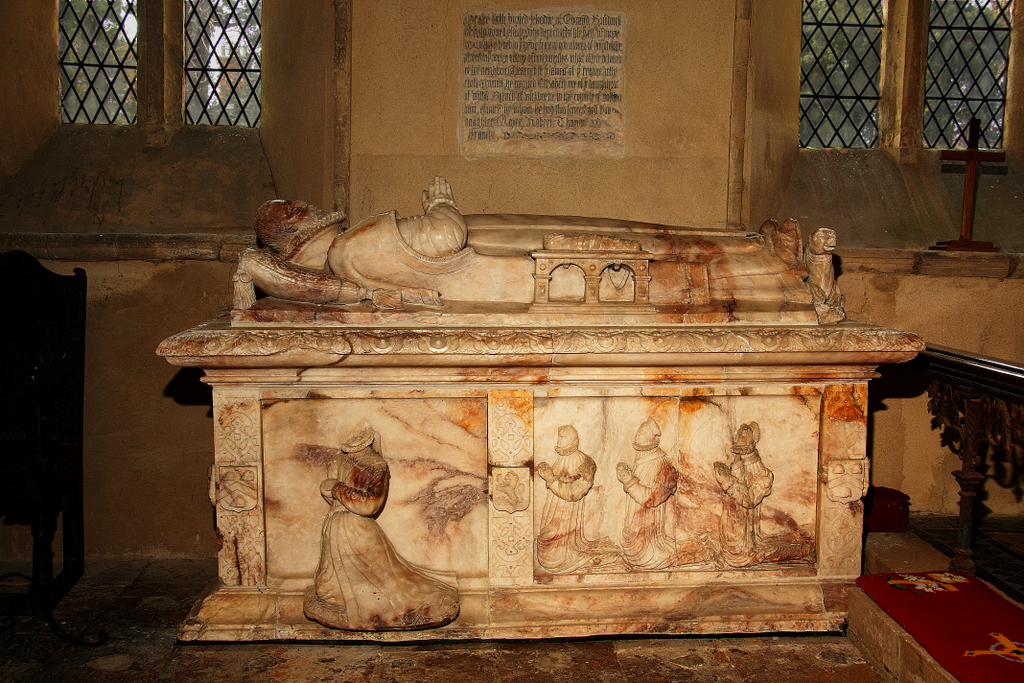
Monument to Edmund Brudenell, d. 1590. After the English Reformation tomb monuments were the mainstay of the industry.

Alabaster religious images in English churches may have survived the Dissolution of the Monasteries in the 1530s, but most did not survive the reign of King Edward VI following the Putting away of Books and Images Act 1549 ordering the destruction of all images. Indeed, eight months after this act, in January 1550 the English ambassador to France reported the arrival of three English ships laden with alabaster images to be sold at Paris, Rouen and elsewhere. Whether these were new images, or ones removed from English churches, is not entirely clear.

From the middle of the sixteenth century, workshops focused instead on sculpting alabaster tombs or church monuments, which were not affected by Protestant aniconism. Indeed, these were becoming larger and more elaborate, and were now taken up by the richer merchant classes as well as the nobility and gentry. Vertical monuments placed against walls generally replaced the older recumbent effigies. There is an elaborate relief panel of Apollo and the Muses, of about 1580, which is probably English, in the Victoria and Albert Museum.

The industry survived on a smaller scale supplying church monuments, increasingly produced by academically trained sculptors, until the falling price of marble and exhaustion of most English quarries made alabaster increasingly rare as a material for English sculptors by the late 18th century.

Spain had the next largest medieval alabaster industry, whose pieces are not always easily distinguished from English work, but pieces were also produced in France, the Low Countries and elsewhere in Europe.

== Forms ==
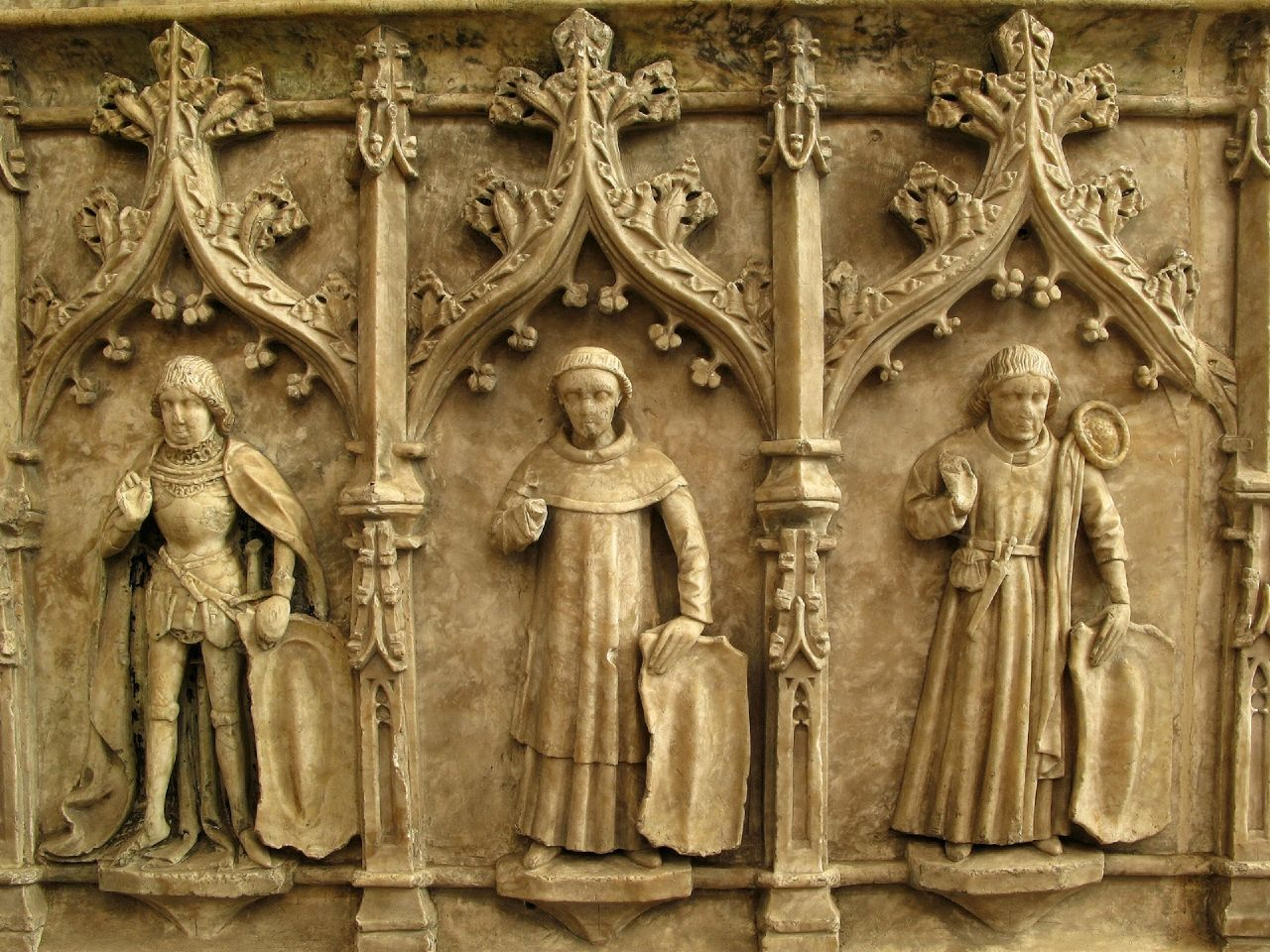
Detail of the tomb of Sir Ralph Fitzherbert, d. 1483, showing some of his children

The sculpture industry evolved to produce two main forms, panels and statues. Thin panels carved in high relief, typically about 40 cm by 25 cm in size, usually come from series covering the Passion or Life of Christ which were mounted in a wooden framework as altarpieces, or used by the wealthy as domestic devotional works, set in a wooden triptych with closeable doors. The 15th-century Nailloux Altarpiece in south-western France is an example of a five-panel set that remains in situ.

Many statues were smaller than this, but there are a number of larger ones. An example of a much larger statue, three feet high and free-standing but flat-backed, is Our Lady of Westminster, now in London but found by the art trade in France. The discovery in 1863 of a headless but stylistically almost identical alabaster image, buried in the churchyard of All Saints, Broughton, Craven, suggests that, as was apparently usually the case, the statue was a standard model repeated several times by the workshop, and probably produced for stock rather than upon receipt of a particular commission. Exports, as of the better documented contemporary export trade in icons of the Cretan school, were usually made in bulk for sale to dealers, who then found buyers locally.

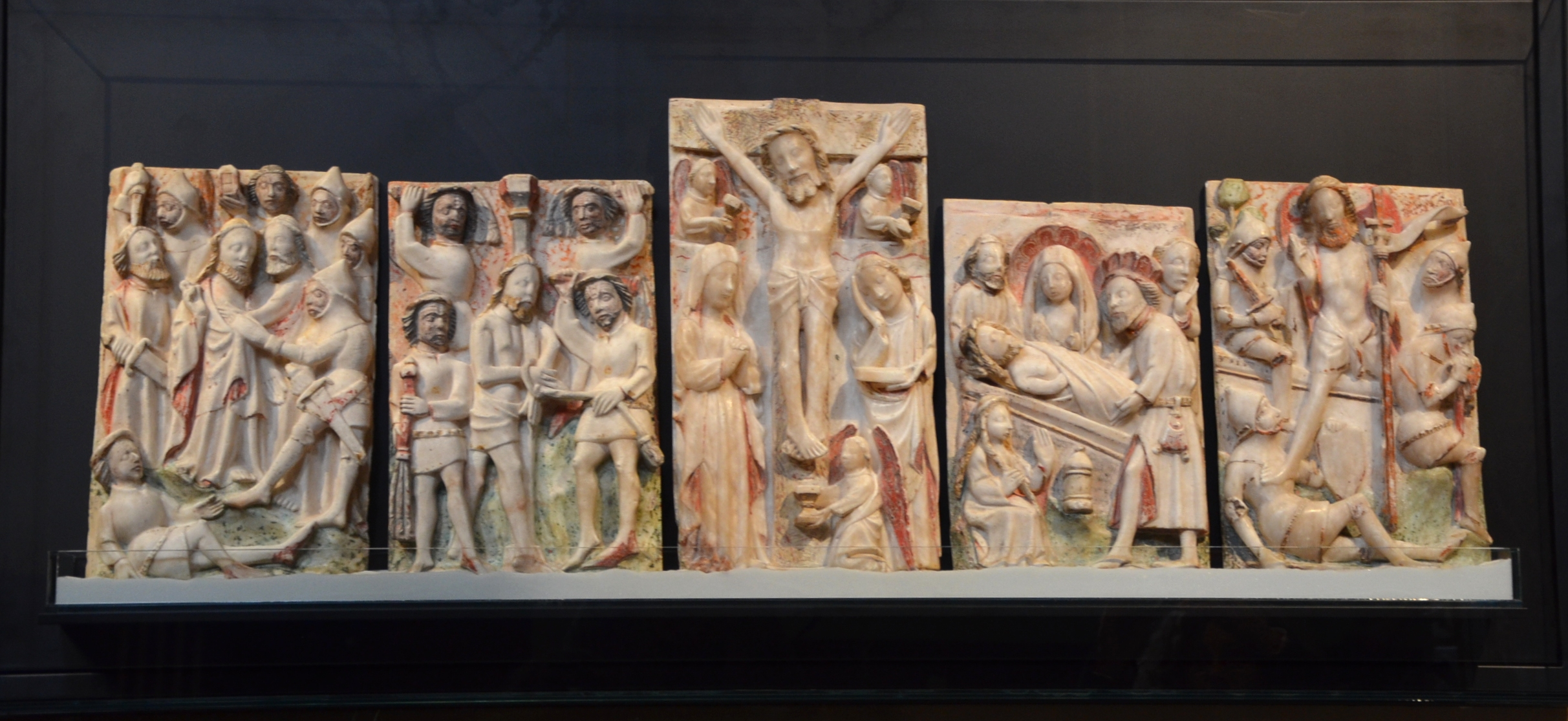
the Nailloux Altarpiece, still in its church, has faint surviving colour. 1450-1500

Most surviving examples have lost much of their paintwork, but the colouring of the carvings was an integral part of the production. Colouring was usually very vivid, with robes being painted in scarlets and blues, hair and accoutrements such as crowns and sceptres were often gilded, and landscapes were decorated with distinctive daisy patterns often against a dark-green ground. Moulded and gilded gesso was also used to give extra richness to the carvings which would need to be brightly coloured, as mostly they would only be seen at a distance by candlelight.

The subjects of the sculptors were the usual content of altarpieces, most often scenes from the Life of Christ or Life of the Virgin. There is a subject apparently unique to English alabasters, the Bosom of Abraham Trinity, a variant of the Throne of Mercy which is more often found, and with the Madonna and Child, is often a larger free-standing statue – such as the Westminster example. Other subjects include saint's lives, including Thomas Becket and, exceptionally, the V&A has a fine detached head of John the Baptist, the subject of a popular devotional cult from the second half of the 15th century right up to the Reformation, which involved fasting on Wednesdays to obtain specific graces.

=== Bosom of Abraham Trinities ===
A rare iconography apparently unique to English alabaster is the "Bosom of Abraham Trinity", where in a composition of the "Throne of Mercy" type, a group of tiny figures are seen in a napkin held or supported between the hands of God the Father. There are five examples of free-standing statues known, in the Burrell Collection Museum in Glasgow, the Museum of Fine Arts, Boston and elsewhere, and nine panels. The theme combines elements of the Western Virgin of Mercy and the Russian Pokrov icons, though these are not necessarily direct influences, and was probably associated with the dedication of All Saints.

=== Scenes from the life of Thomas Beckett ===
There are panels showing scenes from the life of Thomas Beckett:

- The consecration of Thomas Becket as Archbishop
- St. Thomas meeting the Pope at Sens in 1164
- St. Thomas landing at Sandwich
- The Martyrdom of St. Thomas
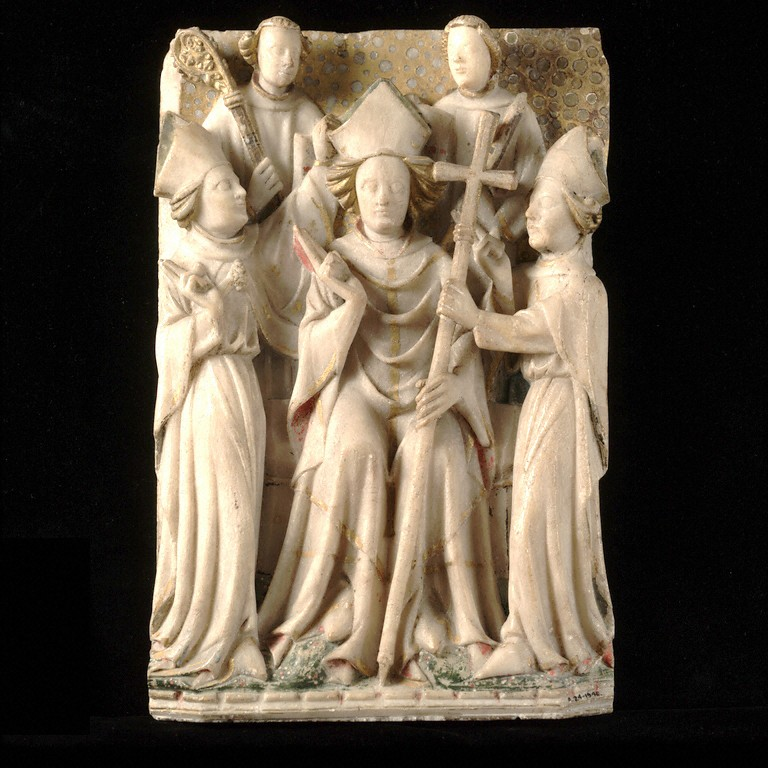
St Thomas Becket enthroned as Archbishop of Canterbury from a Nottingham alabaster in the Victoria & Albert Museum

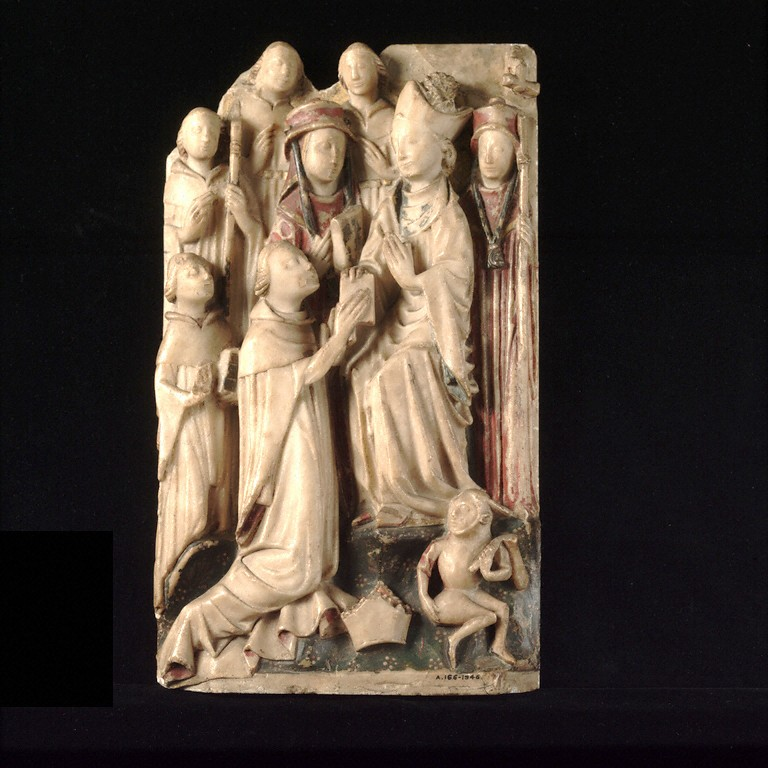
St. Thomas meeting the Pope at Sens

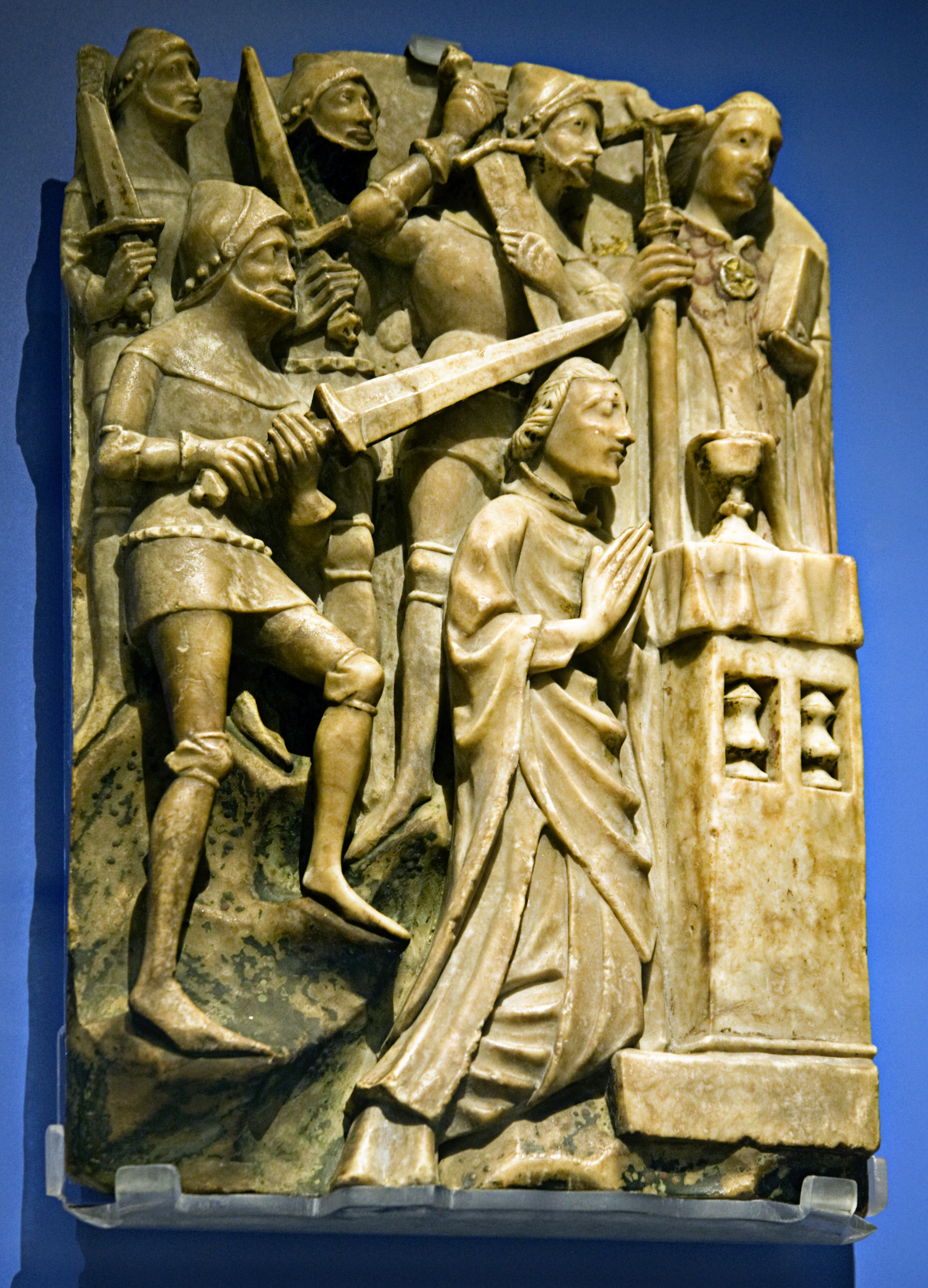
The Martyrdom of St. Thomas from the British Museum

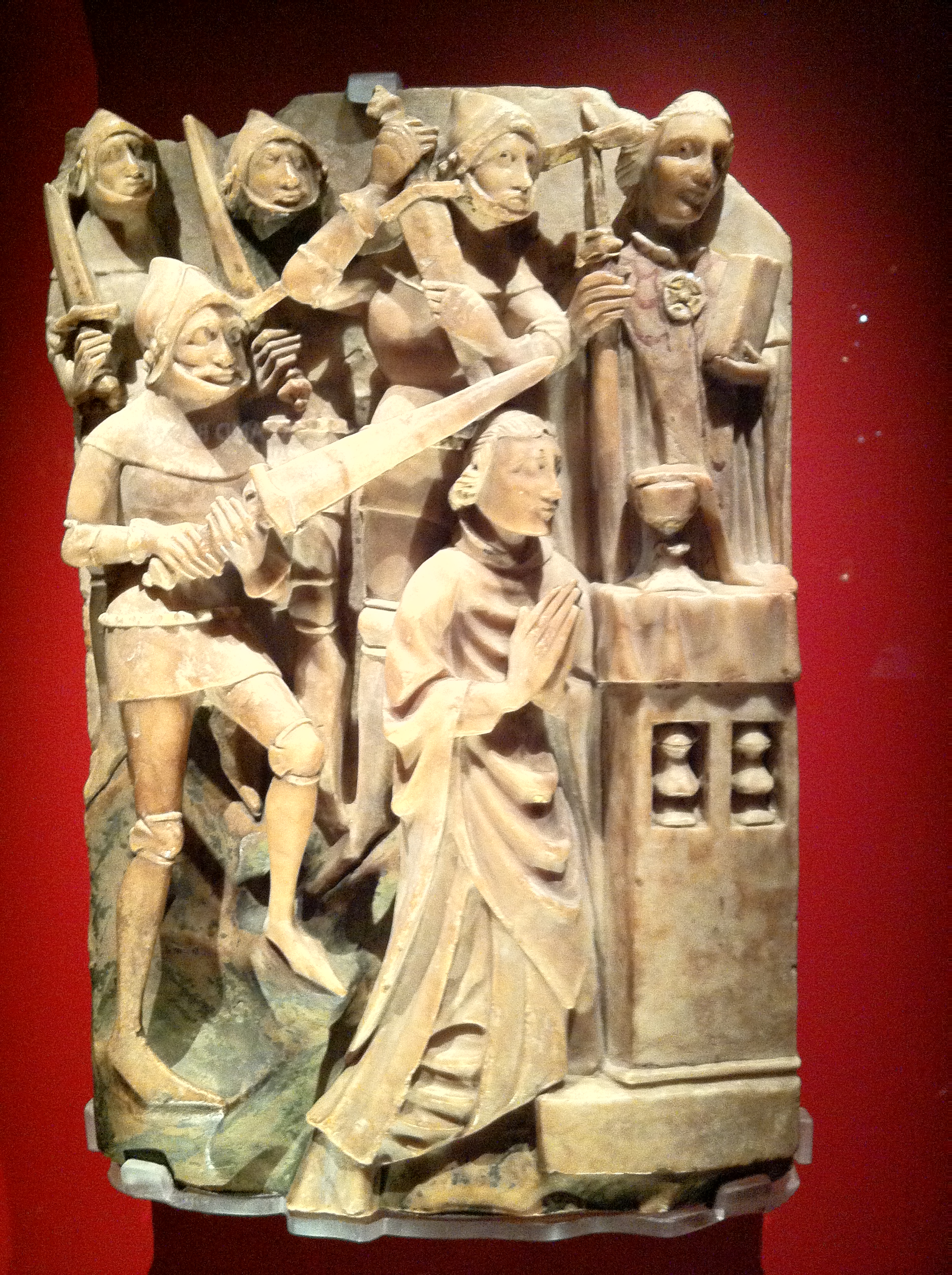
The Martyrdom of St. Thomas

=== Other panels and statues ===
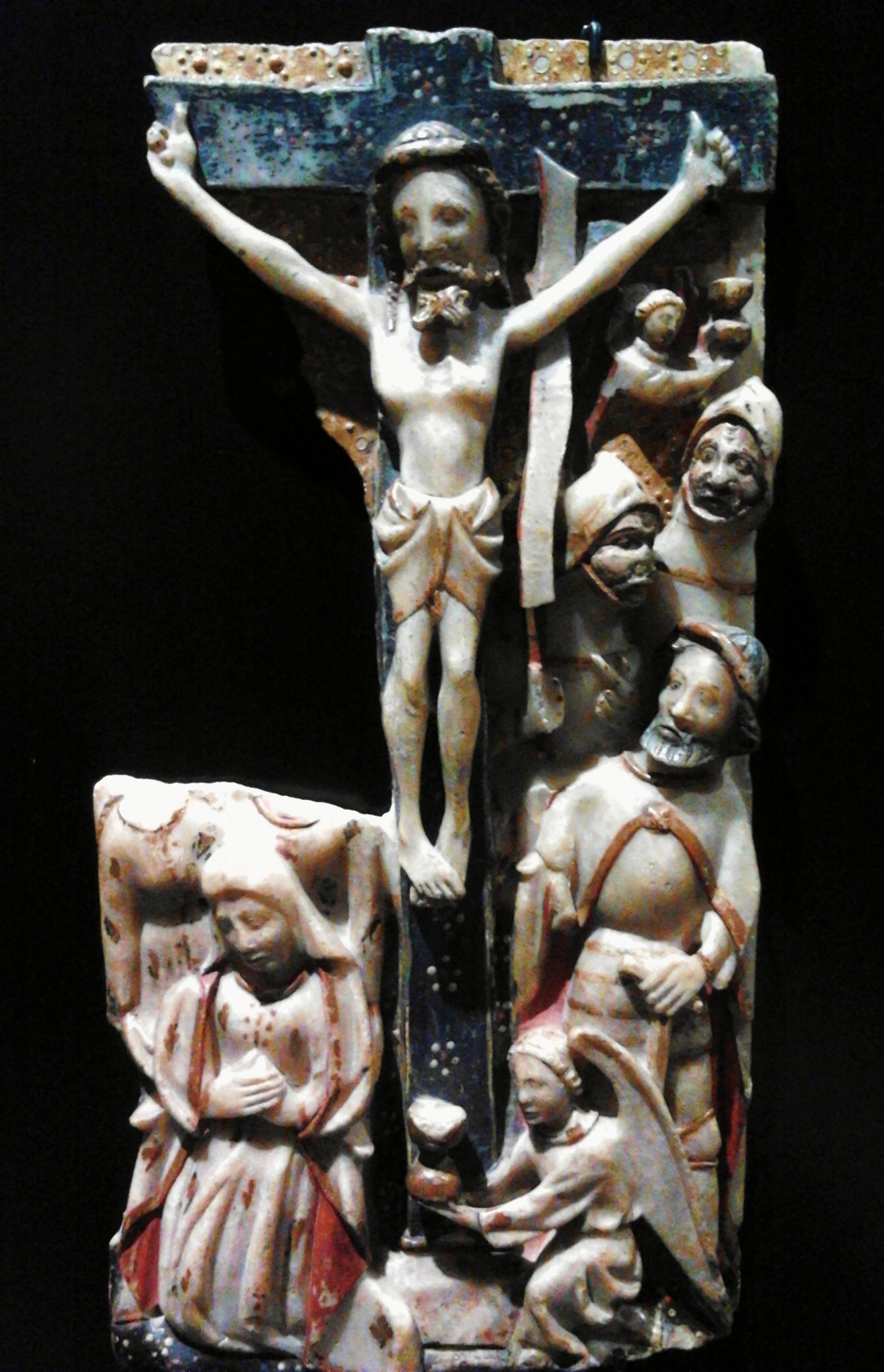
Polychromed Crucifixion, English late 15th century, National Museum in Warsaw

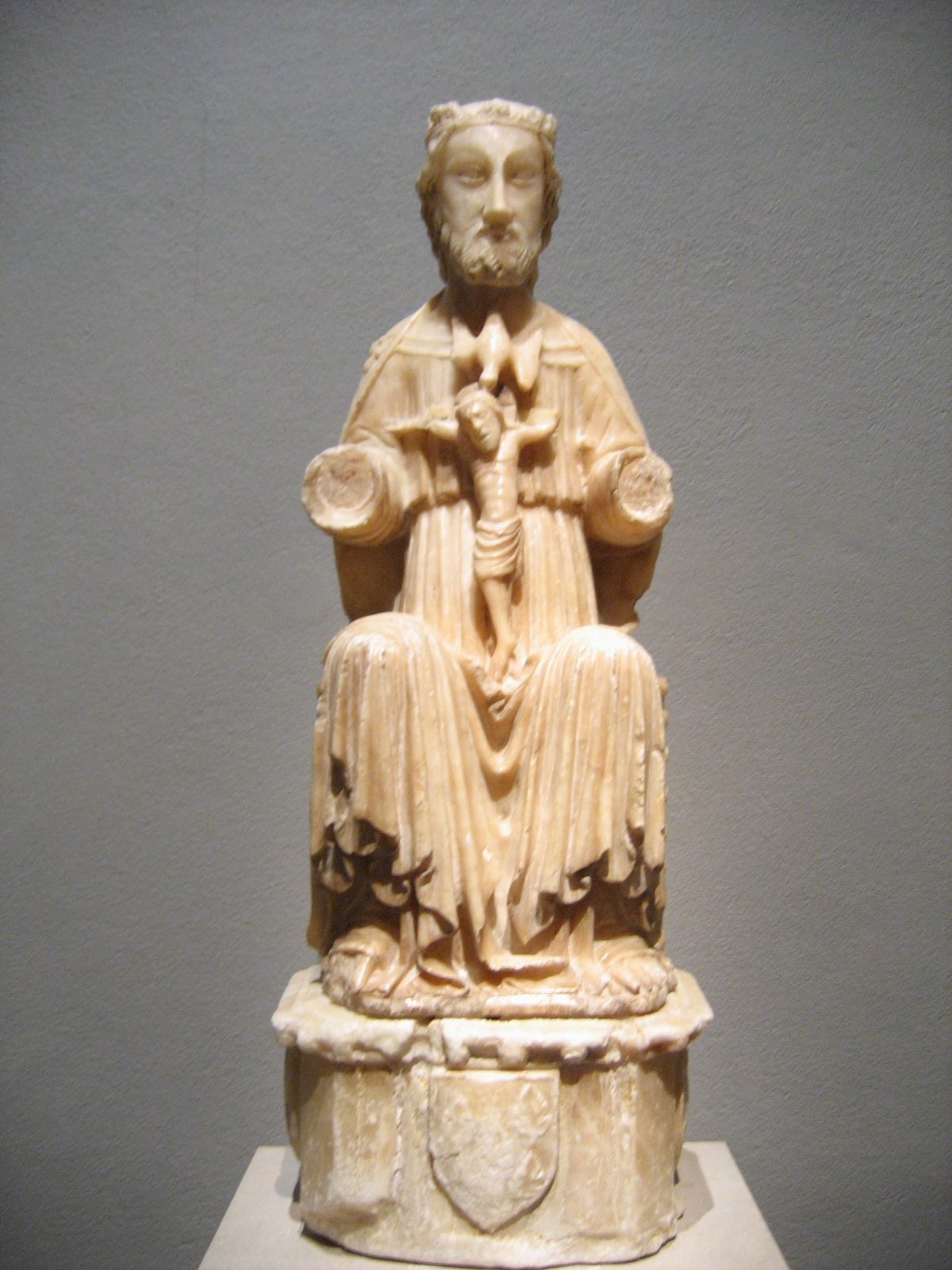
English Trinity.

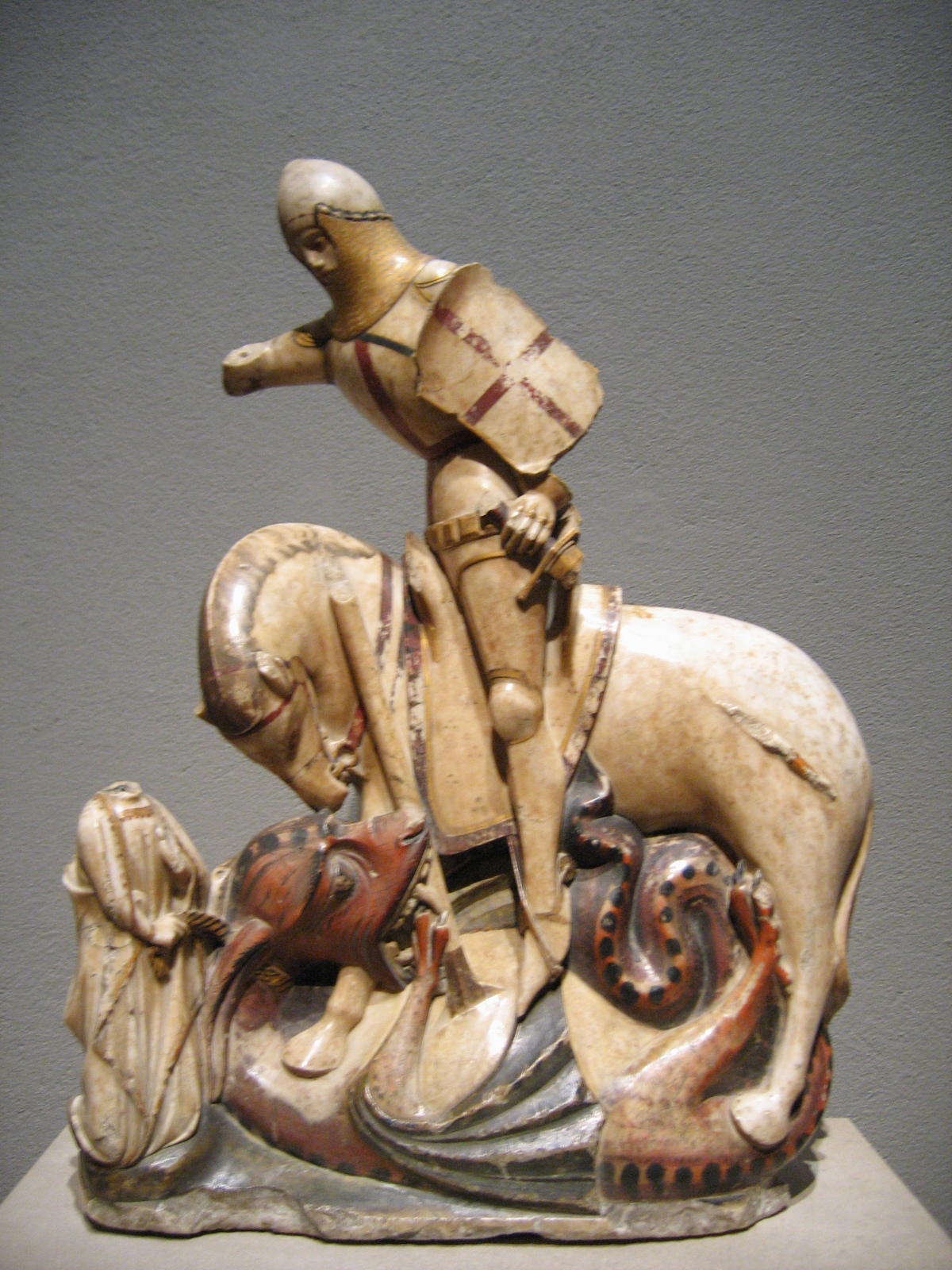
An unusually refined statue of Saint George and the Dragon

== Surviving examples ==
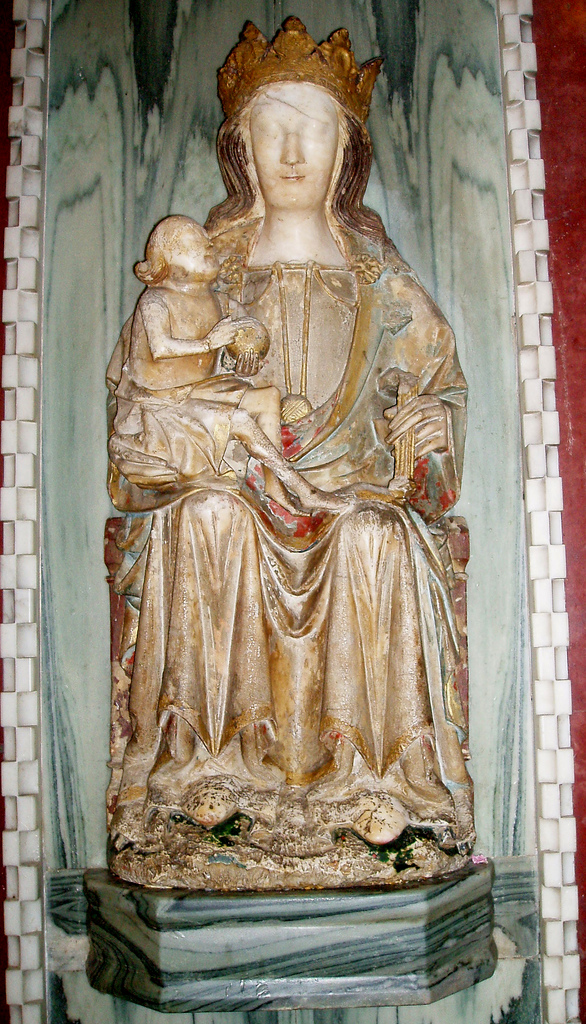
Our Lady of Westminster, Madonna & Child, Westminster Cathedral

The alabaster sculptors were so successful that it developed into an important export trade. Work is still to be found in churches and museums across Europe, and appears in such far flung locations as Croatia, Iceland and Poland.

The Victoria and Albert Museum and Nottingham Castle Museum hold the two principal collections of Nottingham Alabaster in the United Kingdom. The collection in Nottingham includes three alabaster figures, representing The Virgin Mary, St. Peter, and a bishop. These were discovered on the site of St. Peter's Church, Flawford, in 1779. There is a very large single frame piece of the Coronation of the Virgin in the Barber Institute in Birmingham.

Some pieces, such as the Nailloux Altarpiece remain in situ in continental churches. There are complete altarpieces with a series of scenes in the museum of the Cathedral in Santiago de Compostela, and in the Museo di Capodimonte in Naples.

An exceptionally large Virgin & Child (36 in high) known as Our Lady of Westminster, sculpted circa 1450 in Nottingham and exported from there to France, can be found in the Lady Chapel of Westminster Cathedral, London, whence it was installed after being bought at the Paris Exhibition of 1954. This image still carries numerous traces of its original polychromy, such as the characteristic "daisy pattern" against a dark green ground on the base, red and blue in the garment folds and gilding on the crown and mantle fastenings. This image is very similar stylistically to one found buried in the churchyard of Broughton-in-Craven and may have been from the same workshop. Over a dozen English alabaster statues of the Madonna and Child have been traced, mostly recovered from France; the smallest is 16 inches high up to size of the Westminster statue.

== Sources ==
- The Records of the Borough of Nottingham, Nottingham, Thomas Forman & Sons, 1914
- Medieval English Alabaster Carvings in the Castle Museum Nottingham, Francis Cheetham, City of Nottingham art Galleries and Museums Committee, 1973
- English Mediaeval Alabasters: With a catalogue of the collection in the Victoria and Albert Museum, Francis Cheetham, Phaidon Christie's, 1984, ISBN 978-0-7148-8014-3
- The Alabaster Men: Sacred Images From Medieval England, Francis Cheetham, Daniel Katz Ltd 2001
- The Alabaster Images of Medieval England (Museum of London Medieval Finds (1150–1450), Francis Cheetham, The Boydell Press, 2003, ISBN 978-1-84383-028-3
- English Medieval Alabasters: With a Catalogue of the Collection in the Victoria and Albert Museum, Francis Cheetham, Second Edition, The Boydell Press 2005, ISBN 978-1-84383-009-2
- Die englischen Alabastermadonnen des Späten Mittelalters, Karin Land, Düsseldorf University Press 2011, ISBN 978-3-940671-57-8
