= Francis Cheetham =

Francis William Cheetham OBE (5 February 1928 – 8 November 2005) was a leading authority on Nottingham Alabaster and the author of several books and articles on the subject.

== Career ==
Cheetham was born in 1928 and educated at King Edward VII School in Sheffield before taking a degree in Spanish at Sheffield University after the war. After National Service he worked as a teacher in Sheffield and did voluntary work at Sheffield Museum.

He went on to work for Derby Museums Education Service before he moved to take up work at Bolton Museum in 1957. Three years later he returned to the East Midlands to be a deputy art director and curator at Nottingham Castle Museum. After another three years he set up the Norwich Museums Service, based at Norwich Castle.

He was appointed OBE in the 1979 New Year Honours.

== Scholarship ==
His personal study interest was in medieval English alabasters, based on his early work with the Nottingham collection. After retirement he published in 2003 what is now the standard work on the alabasters in the Victoria and Albert Museum.

His work on the Nottingham Alabaster collection was published in 2005. On retirement he lectured extensively for ACE Cultural Tours. Lectures in his name are still given in Norfolk.

== Bibliography ==
- Medieval English Alabaster Carvings in the Castle Museum Nottingham, City of Nottingham art Galleries and Museums Committee, 1973
- English Mediaeval Alabasters: With a catalogue of the collection in the Victoria and Albert Museum, Phaidon Christie's, 1984, ISBN 0-7148-8014-0 (978-0714880143)
- The Alabaster Men: Sacred Images From Medieval England, Daniel Katz Ltd 2001
- The Alabaster Images of Medieval England (Museum of London Medieval Finds 1150 - 1450), The Boydell Press, 2003, ISBN 1-84383-028-0 (978-1843830283)
- English Medieval Alabasters: With a Catalogue of the Collection in the Victoria and Albert Museum, Second Edition, The Boydell Press 2005, ISBN 1-84383-009-4 (978-1843830092)
