= Penitence of Origen =

The Penitence of Origen is a text in the New Testament apocrypha, thought to have been falsely attributed to Origen of Alexandria. Not to be confused with Origen's text Selecta in Threnos (also named Origen on Lamentations), it is a Lamentation purporting to have been cried by Origen himself.

Jodocus Coccius quotes from it (mistakenly attributing it to Selecta in Threnos):

I will begin to throw myself upon my knees, and pray to all the saints to come to my aid; for I do not dare, in consequence of my excess of wickedness, to call upon God. O Saints of God, you I pray with weeping full of grief, that ye would propitiate his mercies for me miserable. Alas me! Father Abraham, pray for me, that I be not driven from thy bosom, which I greatly long for, and yet not worthily, because of the greatness of my sins

The text has an affinity with the prayer used before communion, sometimes known as the Mea Culpa.

The work was declared apocryphal and rejected in the Decretum Gelasianum.
