= Our Lady of Cardigan =

Catholic national shrine of Wales

Coordinates: 52°5′14″N 4°39′9.8″W

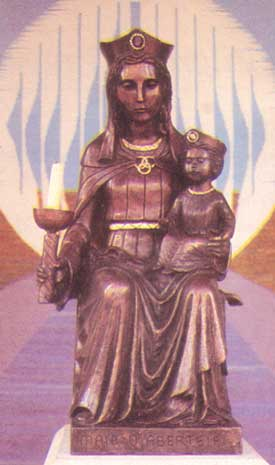
- Our Lady of Cardigan
- Artist: Sr Concordia Scott
- Year: 1986
- Medium: Bronze

Our Lady of Cardigan (Welsh: Mair o Aberteifi), also known as Our Lady of the Taper, the Catholic national shrine of Wales, is a statue of the Blessed Virgin Mary created by Sr Concordia Scott and located in a chapel in Cardigan, Ceredigion, Wales.

== Legend ==
According to Medieval legend, a statue of Our Lady and Child was found beside the River Teifi, in southwest Wales, with a burning taper (candle) in her hand. The statue was taken to the local parish church, although it was moved several times before a church was specially built to house the shrine.

== History ==
The present St Mary's church dates back to around 1158.

The original statue is believed to have been taken to London and destroyed at Chelsea in 1538 along with other Marian images on the orders of Thomas Cromwell, 1st Earl of Essex, chief minister of King Henry VIII.

In 1952, the Bishop of Menevia, John Edward Petit, was informed that Cardigan had once possessed a famous shrine and pilgrimage site, and a new statue was carved based on the description of the original. The new statue was blessed at Westminster Cathedral in London and taken to every parish in the Diocese of Menevia before arriving in Cardigan where it was placed in Our Lady of Sorrows church. Fourteen years later, a new church, Our Lady of the Taper, was consecrated, and the statue was placed in its current home.

== Present ==
A new statue was recast in bronze in 1986 by Sr Concordia Scott and blessed at Cardiff Cathedral before being taken around Wales and then installed before 4,500 pilgrims. A candle blessed by Pope John Paul II in Rome was placed in the statue's hand. The shrine was reinstated by Mgr John Petit and is visited by many pilgrims each year. In September 2010, the statue was transposed to Westminster Cathedral on the occasion of the pastoral visit of Pope Benedict XVI, who personally lit a candle on the statue's hand and blessed a mosaic of Saint David in the cathedral.

Pilgrimages to Our Lady of Cardigan have largely replaced those to Our Lady of Penrhys, in the Rhondda Valley in Glamorgan, documented in Welsh medieval literature but currently difficult to access for crowds.
