= Minster in Thanet Priory =

St Mildred's Priory, Minster-in-Thanet
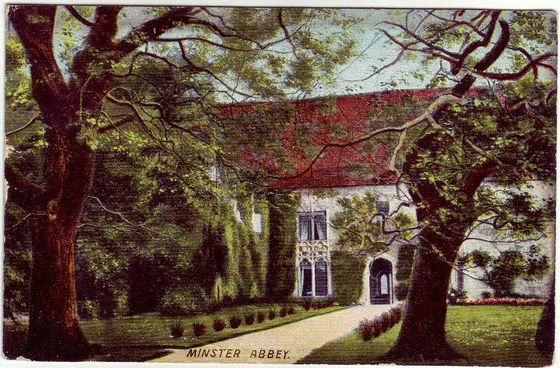
- Minster Abbey on a postcard (ca 1905)

- Location within Kent
- OS grid reference: TR313644
- Civil parish: Minster-in-Thanet
- District: Thanet
- Shire county: Kent
- Region: South East
- Country: England
- Sovereign state: United Kingdom
- Post town: RAMSGATE
- Postcode district: CT12
- Police: Kent
- Fire: Kent
- Ambulance: South East Coast
- List of places UK England Kent 51.3315°N 1.3184°E Thanet with Minster Abbey site marked. Approximate Cursus Cerve (St Mildred’s Lynch)

Minster Abbey is the name of two abbeys in Minster-in-Thanet, Kent, England. The first was a 7th-century foundation which lasted until the Dissolution of the Monasteries. Beside its ruins is St Mildred's Priory, a Benedictine community of women founded in 1937.

== History ==
According to the Kentish Royal Legend, Minster Abbey was a double monastery founded AD 670 by Domne Eafe or Domneva; Eormenburg or Ermenburga is either her original name or that of her sister and all four names are associated with accounts of the early life of the abbey. There has been over a thousand years of potential confusion over the names which is explained in more detail at Domne Eafe and Eormenburg.

=== Cursus Cerve ( St Mildred’s Lynch ) ===
Domne Eafe was the Kentish princess who accepted land for a house of prayer as Weregild for the killing of her brothers Æthelred and Æthelberht. The story is that she was granted as much land as her pet deer could define in a day, whence the deer used to symbolise Minster-in-Thanet. The boundary so defined is shown on mediaeval maps, and has been called the Cursus Cerve or St Mildred’s Lynch.

=== Further history ===
Domne Eafe was succeeded as abbess in about 700 by her daughter Mildrith (Mildred), who was succeeded by Edburga, daughter of King Centwine of the West Saxons. At the end of the eighth century the abbess was Selethryth, sister of King Offa of Mercia, and she was remembered for recovering estates of the abbey which had been seized by Archbishop Wulfred of Canterbury. She was succeeded by Abbess Cwoenthryth.

According to late traditions the abbey was sacked by the Vikings in about 855, but at the end of the ninth century Asser wrote in the present tense that "an excellent minster is established on the island". The boundary of the community is mentioned in Charter S 535 of 948.

At the Reformation the abbeys were dissolved and Minster Abbey became Crown property. It became a private house until in 1937 it was bought by Benedictine nuns from St Walburga's Abbey in Eichstätt, Bavaria as a refuge from persecution and became a dependent Priory.

In 1953 a small relic of St Mildred was returned to Minster from Deventer in the Netherlands.

== Holy Days ==
- 13 July, St Mildred's feast day
- 19 November, St Ermenburga's feast day
- 12 December, St Edburga's feast day

== Visiting ==
Most of the grounds of the abbey are closed to the public, although it is possible to view the outside of the Saxon and Norman wings on guided tours. The abbey's chapel is accessible for private prayer as is the nearby parish church, St Mary the Virgin. Minster railway station is about 350 yards from the abbey.
