= Limbo =

Theological concept

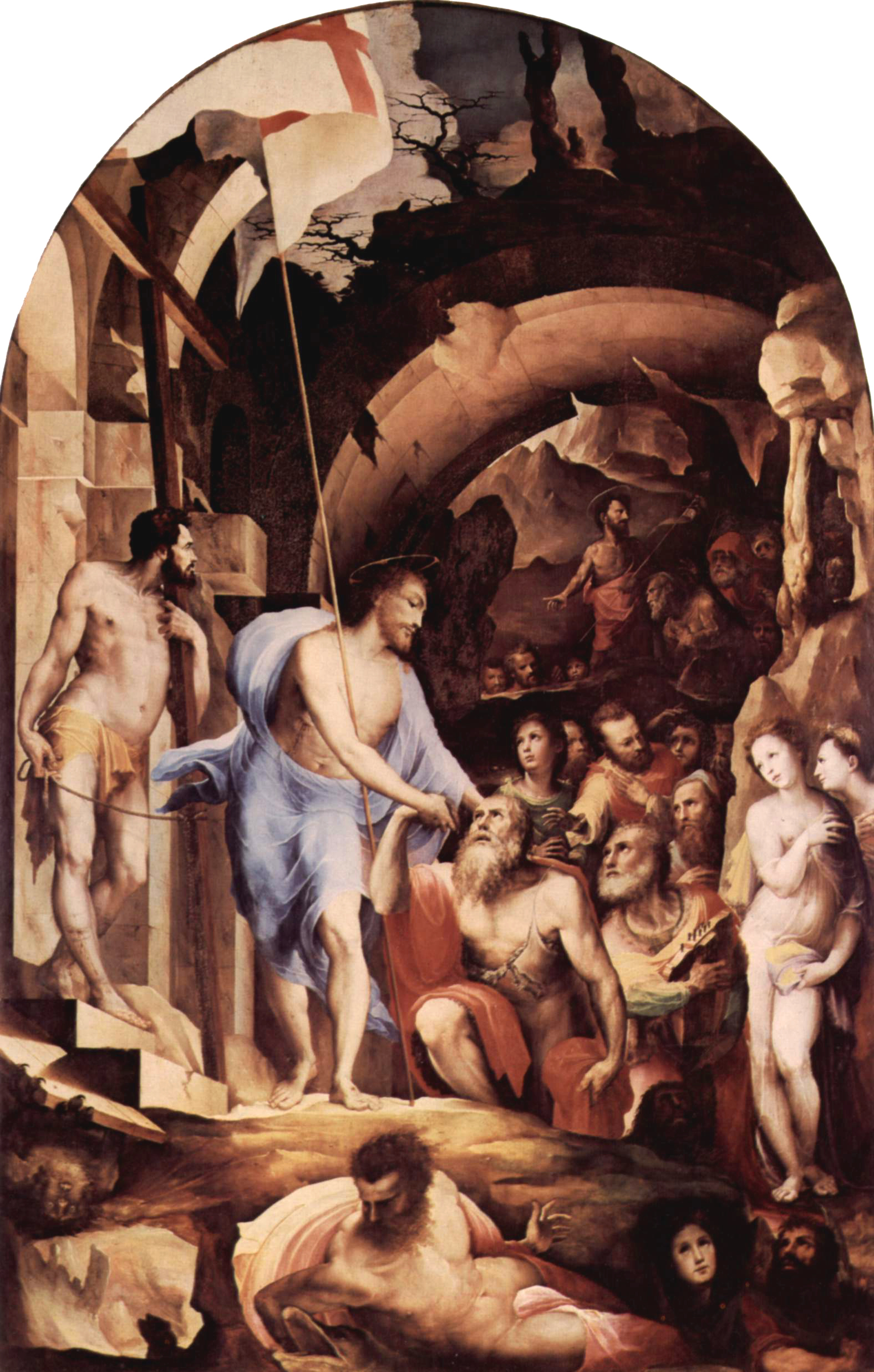
Jesus in Limbo by Domenico Beccafumi

The unofficial term Limbo /ˈlɪmboʊ/ (from Latin limbus 'edge, boundary', referring to the edge of Hell) is the afterlife condition, in medieval Catholic theology, of those who die in original sin without being assigned to the Hell of the Damned.

Some medieval theologians of Western Europe described the underworld ("hell", "hades", "infernum") as divided into three distinct parts: Hell of the Damned, Limbo of the Fathers or Patriarchs, and Limbo of the Infants.

The Limbo of the Fathers is the state or place for people who were friends of God but died before the death of Jesus Christ; when Jesus died he descended into hell and rescued the souls of those who had died before him: this is traditionally known as the Harrowing of Hell.

The Limbo of the Infants was the hope that just because a child died before baptism, it does not mean they deserve punishment (or are developed enough to be cognizant of separation from God), though they cannot have full salvation (or experience the Beatific Vision). The Limbo of the Infants is neither affirmed nor denied by Catholic doctrine.

== Limbo of the Patriarchs ==
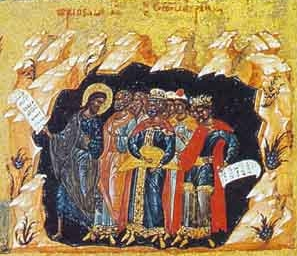
The Old Testament righteous follow Christ from Hades to heaven (Russian icon).

The "Limbo of the Patriarchs" or "Limbo of the Fathers" (Latin limbus patrum) is seen as the temporary state of those who, despite the sins they may have committed, died in the friendship of God but could not enter heaven until redemption by Jesus Christ made it possible. The term Limbo of the Fathers was a medieval name for the part of the underworld (Hades) where the patriarchs of the Old Testament were believed to be kept until Christ's soul descended into it by his death through crucifixion and freed them.

The Catechism of the Catholic Church describes Christ's descent into Hell as meaning primarily that "the crucified one sojourned in the realm of the dead prior to his resurrection. This was the first meaning given in the apostolic preaching to Christ's descent into Hell: that Jesus, like all men, experienced death and in his soul joined the others in the realm of the dead." It adds: "But he descended there as Saviour, proclaiming the Good News to the spirits imprisoned there." It does not use the word Limbo.

This concept of Limbo affirms that admittance to heaven is possible only through the intervention of Jesus Christ, but does not portray Moses, etc. as being punished eternally in Hell. The concept of Limbo of the Patriarchs is not spelled out in Scripture, but is seen by some as implicit in various references:

- Luke 16:22 speaks of the "bosom of Abraham", which both the Roman Catholic Church and the Eastern Orthodox Church, following early Christian writers, understand as a temporary state of souls awaiting entrance into heaven. The end of that state is set either at the Resurrection of the Dead, the most common interpretation in the East, or at the Harrowing of Hell, the most common interpretation in the West, but adopted also by some in the East.
- Jesus told the Good Thief that the two of them would be together "this day" in Paradise (Luke 23:43; see also Matthew 27:38); but on the Sunday of his resurrection he said that he had "not yet ascended to the Father" (John 20:17). At least one Medieval devotional source and a course of Catholic religious instruction dating to or before the early 1900s posit the view that the descent of Jesus Christ to the abode of the dead, his presence among them, turned it into a paradise. It is also possible that the intended text was not "I say to you, This day you will be with me in paradise", but "I say to you this day, You will be with me in paradise". Timothy Radcliffe explained the "today" as a reference to the "Today of eternity".
- Jesus is also described as preaching to "the spirits in prison" (1 Peter 3:19). Medieval drama sometimes portrayed Christ leading a dramatic assault – the Harrowing of Hell – during the three days between the Crucifixion and the resurrection. In this assault, Jesus freed the souls of the just and escorted them triumphantly into heaven. This imagery is still used in the Eastern Orthodox Church's Holy Saturday liturgy (between Good Friday and Pascha) and in Eastern Orthodox icons of the Resurrection of Jesus.
- The doctrine expressed by the term Limbo of the Fathers was taught, for instance, by Clement of Alexandria (c. 150 – c. 215), who maintained: "It is not right that these should be condemned without trial, and that those alone who lived after the coming [of Christ] should have the advantage of the divine righteousness."

According to Saint Thomas Aquinas, unlike Purgatory and Hell, in the Limbo of Patriarchs there was not the penalty of sense (the affliction by fire in which the soul burns after death and also the body after the resurrection of the flesh), but solely the penalty of harm, which is the privation of the beatific vision of God. However, the souls in Limbo of Patriarchs enjoyed the natural knowledge of God and experienced great joy because of the future glory that awaited them in Paradise.

== Limbo of Infants ==
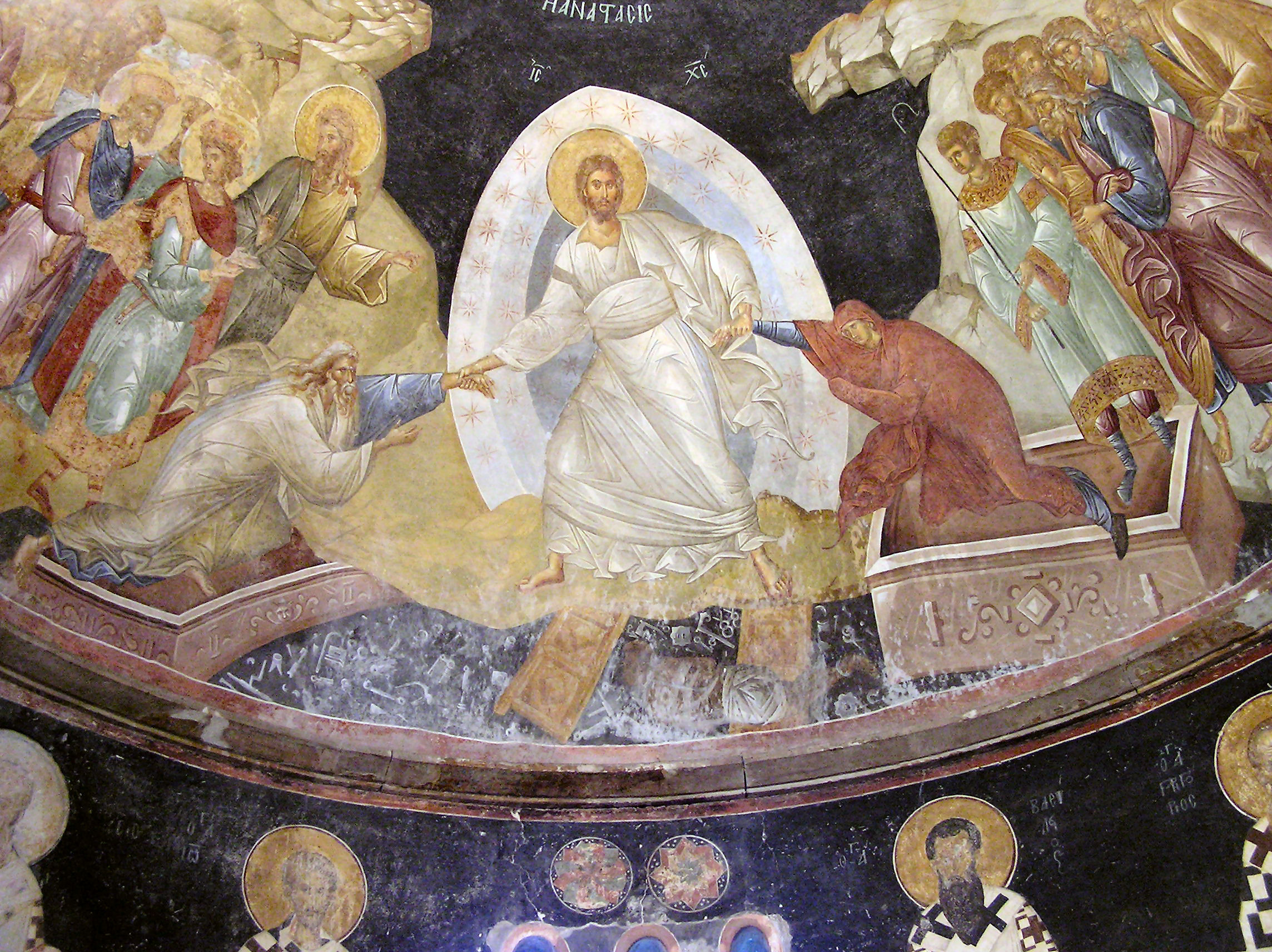
Byzantine depiction in the Church of Chora of the resurrection of Christ, raising Adam and Eve who represent all humankind, with the righteous prophets of the Old Testament observing

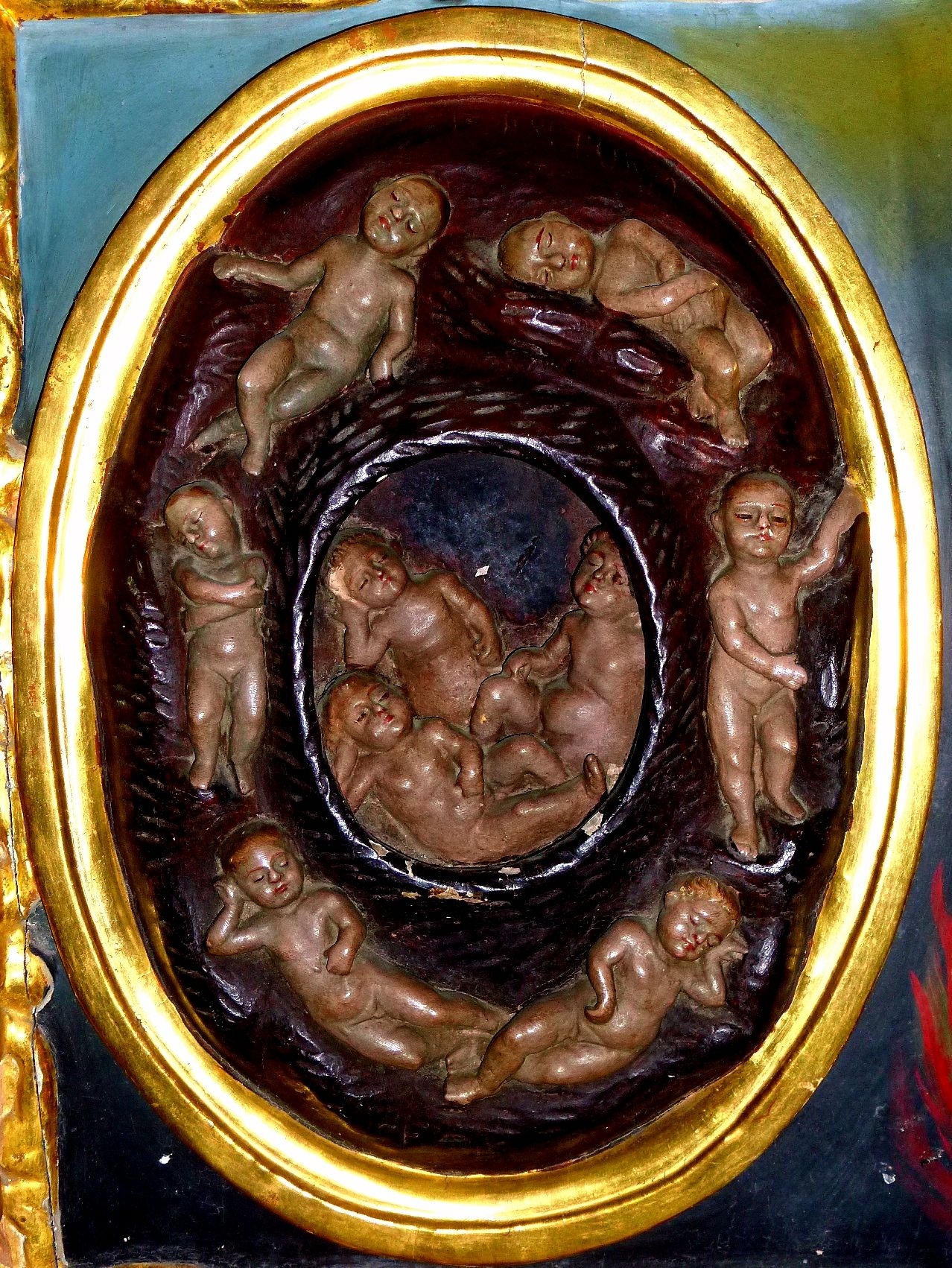
Limbo of Infants in the Cathedral of Tuy (Galicia, Spain)

The Limbo of Infants (Latin limbus infantium or limbus puerorum) is the hypothetical permanent status of the unbaptized who die in infancy, too young to have committed actual sins, but not having been freed from original sin. Recent Catholic theological speculation tends to stress the hope, although not the certainty, that these infants may attain heaven instead of the state of Limbo. Many Catholic priests and prelates say that the souls of unbaptized children must simply be "entrusted to the mercy of God", and whatever their status is cannot be known.

While the Catholic Church has a defined doctrine on original sin, it has none on the eternal fate of unbaptised infants, leaving theologians free to propose different theories, which magisterium is free to accept or reject. Nonetheless, according to Catholic dogma, baptism, or at least the desire for it, along with supernatural faith or at least the "habit of faith", are necessary for salvation. Hence, it is not immediately clear how to reconcile the mercy of God for unbaptized infants with the necessity of baptism and Catholic faith for salvation. Several theories have been proposed. Limbo is one such theory, although the word limbo itself is never mentioned in the Catechism of the Catholic Church. Nonetheless, the theory of limbo has weighty support in the traditional teaching of the Doctors of the Church, such as Saint Thomas Aquinas, Saint Augustine, and Saint Alphonsus Liguori.

=== Latin Fathers ===
In countering Pelagius, who denied original sin, Saint Augustine of Hippo was led to state that because of original sin, "such infants as quit the body without being baptized will be involved in the mildest condemnation of all. That person, therefore, greatly deceives both himself and others, who teaches that they will not be involved in condemnation; whereas the apostle says: 'Judgment from one offence to condemnation' (Romans 5:16), and again a little after: 'By the offence of one upon all persons to condemnation'."

In 418, the Council of Carthage, a synod of North African bishops which included Augustine of Hippo, did not explicitly endorse all aspects of Augustine's stern view about the destiny of infants who die without baptism, but stated in some manuscripts "that there is no intermediate or other happy dwelling place for children who have left this life without Baptism, without which they cannot enter the kingdom of heaven, that is, eternal life". So great was Augustine's influence in the West, however, that the Latin Fathers of the 5th and 6th centuries (e.g., Jerome, Avitus of Vienne, and Gregory the Great) did adopt his position.

=== Medieval theologians ===
In the later Medieval period, some theologians continued to hold Augustine's view. In the 12th century, Peter Abelard (1079–1142) said that these infants suffered no material torment or positive punishment, just the pain of loss at being denied the beatific vision. Others held that unbaptised infants suffered no pain at all: unaware of being deprived of the beatific vision, they enjoyed a state of natural, not supernatural happiness. This theory was associated with but independent of the term "Limbo of Infants", which was coined about the year 1300.

If heaven is a state of supernatural happiness and union with God, and Hell is understood as a state of torture and separation from God then, in this view, the Limbo of Infants, although technically part of hell (the outermost part, limbo meaning 'outer edge' or 'hem') is seen as a sort of intermediate state.

The question of Limbo is not treated in the parts of the Summa Theologica by Thomas Aquinas, but is dealt with in an appendix to the supplement added after his death compiled from his earlier writings. The Limbo of Infants is there described as an eternal state of natural joy, untempered by any sense of loss at how much greater their joy might have been had they been baptised:

Every man who has the use of free-will is adapted to obtain eternal life, because he can prepare himself for grace whereby to merit eternal life; so that if he fails in this, his grief will be very great, since he has lost what he was able to possess. But children were never adapted to possess eternal life, since neither was this due to them by virtue of their natural principles, for it surpasses the entire faculty of nature, nor could they perform acts of their own whereby to obtain so great a good. Hence, they will nowise grieve for being deprived of the divine vision; nay, rather will they rejoice for that they will have a large share of God's goodness and their own natural perfections. Nor can it be said that they were adapted to obtain eternal life, not indeed by their own action, but by the actions of others around them, since they could be baptised by others, like other children of the same condition who have been baptised and obtained eternal life: for this is of superabundant grace that one should be rewarded without any act of one's own. Wherefore the lack of such a grace will not cause sorrow in children who die without Baptism, any more than the lack of many graces accorded to others of the same condition makes a wise man to grieve.

— Summa Theologica, Supplement 1 to the Third Part, article 2

The natural happiness possessed in this place would consist in the perception of God mediated through creatures. As stated in the International Theological Commission's document on the question:

Because children below the age of reason did not commit actual sin, theologians came to the common view that these unbaptized children feel no pain at all or even that they enjoy a full, though only natural, happiness through their mediated union with God in all natural goods (Thomas Aquinas, Duns Scotus).

The afterdeath life cartography that runs through Christian thought from Bernard of Clairvaux to Aquinas is thus composed of five real and physical places: Paradise, Limbo of Patriarchs, Limbo of the Infants, Purgatory and Hell.

=== Modern era ===
In 1442, the Ecumenical Council of Florence spoke of baptism as necessary even for children, and required that they be baptised soon after birth. This had earlier been affirmed at the Council of Carthage in 418. The Council of Florence also stated that those who die in original sin alone go to Hell, but with pains unequal to those suffered by those who had committed actual mortal sins. John Wycliffe's attack on the necessity of infant baptism was condemned by another general council, the Council of Constance. In 1547, the Council of Trent explicitly decreed that baptism (or desire for baptism) is the means by which a person is transferred "from that state wherein man is born a child of the first Adam, to the state of grace, and of the adoption of the sons of God, through the second Adam, Jesus Christ, our Saviour. Pope Pius X taught of Limbo's existence in his Catechism.

However, throughout the 18th and 19th centuries, individual theologians (Bianchi in 1768, H. Klee in 1835, Caron in 1855, H. Schell in 1893) continued to formulate theories of how children who died unbaptised might still be saved. By 1952 a theologian such as Ludwig Ott could, in a widely used and well-regarded manual, openly teach the possibility that children who die unbaptised might be saved for heaven. He also told about Thomas Cajetan, a major 16th-century theologian, that suggested infants dying in the womb before birth, and so before ordinary sacramental baptism could be administered, might be saved through their mother's wish for their baptism. In its 1980 instruction on children's baptism the Congregation for the Doctrine of the Faith stated that "with regard to children who die without having received baptism, the Church can only entrust them to the mercy of God, as indeed she does in the funeral rite established for them", leaving all theories as to their fate, including Limbo, as viable possibilities. In 1984, when Joseph Ratzinger, then Cardinal Prefect of that Congregation, stated that he rejected the claim that children who die unbaptised cannot attain salvation, he was speaking for many academic theologians of his training and background.

The Church's teaching, expressed in the 1992 Catechism of the Catholic Church, is that "Baptism is necessary for salvation for those to whom the Gospel has been proclaimed and who have had the possibility of asking for this sacrament", and that "God has bound salvation to the sacrament of Baptism, but He Himself is not bound by His sacraments". It recalls that, apart from the sacrament, baptism of blood (as in the case of Christian martyrs) and in the case of catechumens who die before receiving the sacrament, explicit desire for baptism, together with Catholic faith, repentance for their sins (specifically perfect contrition, in the case of catechumens) and charity, ensures salvation. It also states that since Christ died for all and all are called to the same divine destiny, "every man who is ignorant of the Gospel of Christ and of his Church, but seeks the truth and does the will of God in accordance with his understanding of it, can be saved", seeing that, if they had known of the necessity of baptism, they would have desired it explicitly. Additionally, at the Council of Trent and in the Vatican's response to Feeneyism in the 1940s, the Church affirmed in every case the necessity of Catholic faith (also called "supernatural faith"), or at least the "habit of faith", for salvation.

It then states:

As regards children who have died without Baptism, the Church can only entrust them to the mercy of God, as she does in her funeral rites for them. Indeed, the great mercy of God who desires that all men should be saved, and Jesus' tenderness toward children which caused him to say: "Let the children come to me, do not hinder them", allow us to hope that there is a way of salvation for children who have died without Baptism. All the more urgent is the Church's call not to prevent little children coming to Christ through the gift of holy Baptism.

Merely stating that one can "hope" in a way of salvation other than baptism, the Church thus urgently reiterates its appeal to baptize infants, the only certain means to "not prevent" their "coming to Christ" for salvation.

On 20 April 2007, the advisory body known as the International Theological Commission released a document, originally commissioned by Pope John Paul II, entitled "The Hope of Salvation for Infants Who Die without Being Baptized." After tracing the history of the various opinions that have been and are held on the eternal fate of unbaptized infants, including that connected with the theory of the Limbo of Infants, and after examining the theological arguments, the document stated its conclusion as follows:

Our conclusion is that the many factors that we have considered above give serious theological and liturgical grounds for hope that unbaptized infants who die will be saved and enjoy the beatific vision. We emphasize that these are reasons for prayerful hope, rather than grounds for sure knowledge. There is much that simply has not been revealed to us. We live by faith and hope in the God of mercy and love who has been revealed to us in Christ, and the Spirit moves us to pray in constant thankfulness and joy.

What has been revealed to us is that the ordinary way of salvation is by the sacrament of baptism. None of the above considerations should be taken as qualifying the necessity of baptism or justifying delay in administering the sacrament. Rather, as we want to reaffirm in conclusion, they provide strong grounds for hope that God will save infants when we have not been able to do for them what we would have wished to do, namely, to baptize them into the faith and life of the Church.

Pope Benedict XVI authorized publication of this document, indicating that he considers it consistent with the Church's teaching, though it is not an official expression of that teaching. Media reports that by the document "the Pope closed Limbo" are thus without foundation. In fact, the document explicitly states that "the theory of limbo [...] never entered into the dogmatic definitions of the Magisterium. Still, that same Magisterium did at times mention the theory in its ordinary teaching up until the Second Vatican Council. It remains therefore a possible theological hypothesis". The document thus allows the limbo hypothesis to be held as one of the existing theories about the fate of children who die without being baptised, a question on which there is "no explicit answer" from Scripture or tradition. The traditional theological alternative to Limbo was not heaven, but rather some degree of suffering in Hell. At any rate, these theories are not the official teaching of the Catholic Church but rather opinions that the Church permits to be held by its members, just as is the theory of possible salvation for infants dying without baptism.

== In other denominations ==
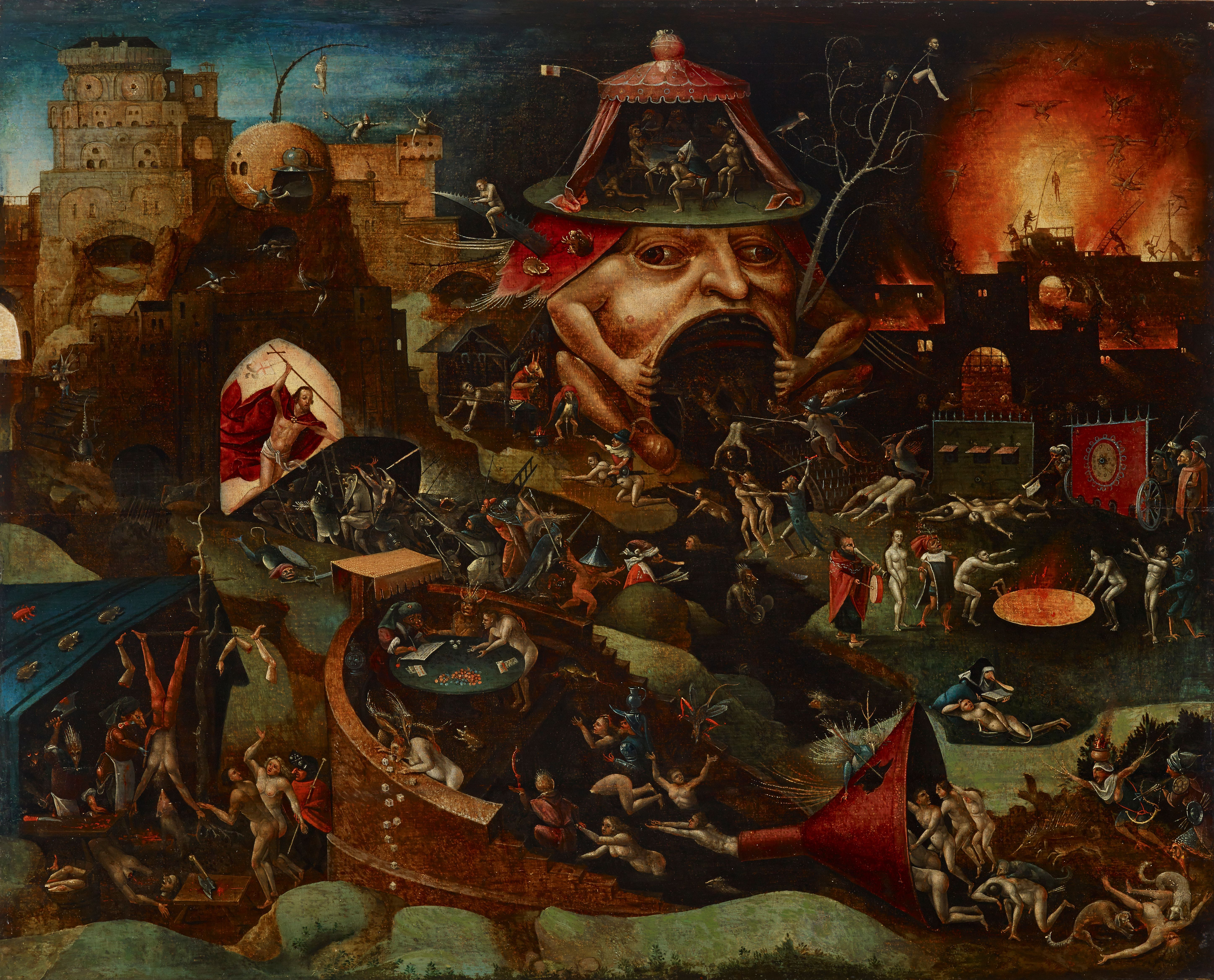
Christ in Limbo (c. 1575) by an anonymous follower of Hieronymus Bosch

=== Protestant and Eastern Orthodox ===
Neither the Eastern Orthodox Church nor Protestantism accepts the concept of a limbo of infants; but, while not using the expression "Limbo of the Patriarchs", the Eastern Orthodox Church lays much stress on the risen Christ's action of liberating Adam and Eve and other righteous figures of the Old Testament, such as Abraham and David, from Hades (see Harrowing of Hell).

Some Protestants have a similar understanding of those who died as believers prior to the crucifixion of Jesus residing in a place that is not Heaven, but not Hell. The doctrine holds that Hades has two "compartments", one an unnamed place of torment, the other named "Abraham's bosom". Luke 16:19–16:26 speaks of a chasm fixed between the two which cannot be crossed. Those in the unnamed "compartment" have no hope, and will ultimately be consigned to hell. Those in Abraham's bosom are those of whom it is written of Jesus, "When He ascended on high, He led captive a host of captives" (Ephesians 4:8), quoting Psalm 68:18). These individuals, the captives, now reside with God in Heaven. Both "Compartments" still exist, but Abraham's bosom is now empty, while the other chamber is not, according to this doctrine.

=== Nontrinitarian ===
Latter-day Saints teach that "there is a space between death and the resurrection of the body [...] a state of the soul in happiness or in misery until the time [...] that the dead shall come forth, and be reunited, both soul and body, and be brought to stand before God, and be judged according to their works." It is also taught that "all who have died without a knowledge of [the] gospel, who would have received it if they had been permitted to tarry, shall be heirs of the celestial kingdom of God.".

Jehovah's Witnesses, Christadelphians, and others have taught that the dead are unconscious (or even nonexistent), awaiting their destiny on Judgment Day.

== Comparative religion ==
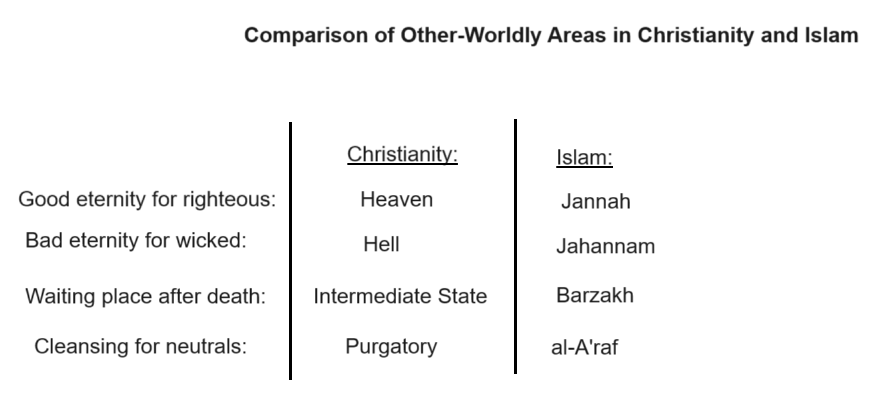
Comparison of Other-wordly places in Christianity and Islam

=== In other Abrahamic religions ===
While Jewish sources are conflicted about what happens to individuals after they die, the concept of limbo does not arise. Furthermore, even the conception of Hell in Judaism is presented as a temporary stage, typically transpiring over a short period of time. According to Talmud, the judgment of the wicked in Gehenna lasts for twelve months. This teaching is attributed to Rabbi Akiva (50-135 AD).

In Islam, which denies the existence of original sin in totality, the concept of Limbo exists as Barzakh, the state that exists after death, prior to the day of resurrection. During this period, sinners are punished and the adequately purified rest in comfort. Children, however, are exempt from this stage, as they are regarded as innocent and are automatically classed as Muslims (despite religious upbringing). After death, they go directly to Heaven, where they are cared for by Abraham. According to Christian Louis Lange, Islam also possesses a al-aʿrāf (cf. Q.7:46) "a residual place or limbo" situated between heaven and hell where there is "neither punishment nor reward".

=== Buddhism ===
In Buddhism, Bardo (Sanskrit: antarabhāva) is sometimes described as similar to limbo. It is an intermediate state in which the recently deceased experiences various phenomena before being reborn in another state, including heaven or hell. According to Mahāyāna Buddhism, the arhat must ultimately embrace the path of the bodhisattva, despite having reached enlightenment. The Laṅkāvatāra Sūtra states that an arhat obtains a samādhikāya ('rapture-body') and is reborn in a lotus in a transitory state of existence, unable to awaken for a whole eon. This is likened to a person intoxicated who must spend a certain period of time before becoming sober.

=== Greek mythology ===
In Classical Greek mythology, the section of Hades known as the Fields of Asphodel was a realm much resembling Limbo, to which the vast majority of people who were held to have deserved neither the Elysian Fields (Heaven) nor Tartarus (Hell) were consigned for eternity.

=== Zoroastrianism ===
The Zoroastrian concept of hamistagan is similar to Limbo. Hamistagan is a neutral state in which a soul that was neither good nor evil awaits their judgement in Frashokereti.

== See also ==
- First circle of hell
- Intermediate state
- Matarta in Mandaeism
- Shatrin in Mandaeism
- Spirit world (Latter Day Saints)
- Spirits in prison
