= List of fictional towns in animation =

This is a list of animated fictional towns, villages, settlements and cities. This list should include only well-referenced, notable examples of fictional settlements that are integral to a work of fiction and substantively depicted therein. Fictionalized versions of actual towns (such as Raytown, Missouri in Mama's Family or Bayonne, New Jersey in The Adventures of Pete & Pete) are not included. Animated adaptations of comics, books, films and video games should only be listed if the animated version is notably different from the original work.

Town name	Origin	Network or company	Notes
A
Aberdale, Arizona	Clarence	Cartoon Network	A fictional town located in Arizona.
Acme Acres, USA	Tiny Toon Adventures	Kids WB	The main location of the show, and the characters live here and graduate at a famous university known as Acme Looniversity. It is commonly placed as being in southern California, but has also been depicted as being in Missouri, northwest Arkansas, or between New York City and Philadelphia (due to being ~1,000 mi. from Ft. Lauderdale, Florida along Interstate 95).
Adventure Bay	PAW Patrol	Nickelodeon	A fictional city and the main setting of the series.
Amity Park	Danny Phantom	Nickelodeon	Amity Park is a fictional city and is the main setting for Danny Phantom. It has a school (Casper High School), and some other buildings. It resides somewhere in the continental US, excluding California, Colorado, Florida, Michigan, Nevada, and Wisconsin.
Animville	Oggy and the Cockroaches	Xilam	
Aozora City	Tropical-Rouge! Pretty Cure	TV Asahi	The main location of the series, and where the five main Cures live
Arlen, Texas	King of the Hill	FOX	Arlen is a small fictional town in Texas approximately 96 miles outside of Dallas and has an area code of 409 that includes Beaumont and Galveston.
Aron City, Washington	Johnny Bravo	Cartoon Network	Aron City is a fictional town in Washington and the main setting of Johnny Bravo.
Ayanagi City, Toyama	Persona -trinity soul-	Tokyo MX, BS11, MBS, Animax, Chiba TV, CBC, TV Saitama and tvk	Located in the Toyama Prefecture, Chūbu region (in Honshu island, Japan), this is the main setting of Persona -trinity soul- and the hometown of Shin Kanzato (the protagonist of Persona -trinity soul-)
B
Ba Sing Se	Avatar: The Last Airbender	Nickelodeon	Ba Sing Se is the fictional capital of the Earth Kingdom and the largest city in the Avatar Universe. Its name means Impenetrable City, due to its massive walls surrounding the municipality.
Balsa City	Scaredy Squirrel	YTV	Balsa City is a fictional town and the main setting of Scaredy Squirrel.
Bathsville City	Rubbadubbers	Nick Jr. Channel	Bathsville City is the major setting of the show.
Beach City, Delmarva	Steven Universe	Cartoon Network	Beach City is a town located in the fictional American state of Delmarva, which is based on the real-world Delmarva Peninsula.
Beanotown, UK	Dennis & Gnasher: Unleashed!	CBBC	A fictional town in England where Dennis and Gnasher live.
Bedrock	The Flintstones	ABC	Bedrock is the fictional prehistoric city, which is home to the characters of the animated television series The Flintstones (1960). The population of the town is 2,500.
Beika	Detective Conan (Case Closed)	Yomiuri TV, TMS Entertainment	Capital city based on Tokyo, main setting for both manga and anime series.
Bellwood, USA	Ben 10	Cartoon Network	Bellwood is the hometown of Ben Tennyson (the main protagonist of Ben 10) and his family.
Berlint, Ostania	Spy × Family	Wit Studio Cloverworks	Berlint is the capital city of Ostania It is located in the Berlin of Ostania.
Big City	Big City Greens	Disney Channel	Big City is a megalopolis where the main setting for the show and where the Greens live.
Bigg City	TUGS	CITV	Bigg City is a fictional town and the main setting of TUGS.
Bikini Bottom, Pacific Ocean	SpongeBob SquarePants	Nickelodeon	Bikini Bottom is a fictional underwater city located beneath the real-life Bikini Atoll and the main setting of SpongeBob SquarePants.
Bluffington, USA	Doug	Nickelodeon, Disney Channel	Bluffington is a small city based on Richmond, Virginia. Doug and his friends live in one of its suburbs.
Blytonbury	Little Witch Academia	Netflix	A big city located in Japan, and is located near Glastonbury.
Bobsville	Bob the Builder	CBeebies	Bobsville is a town that serves as the main setting for the first nine seasons. It was founded by and named after Bob's father, Robert.
Bonesborough	The Owl House	Disney Channel	A major, medieval-style town in the Boiling Isles
Boopelite City	Pig Goat Banana Cricket	Nickelodeon	The main setting of the show
Boxwood Terrace	Ready Jet Go!	PBS Kids	A fictional town located in Washington, and where Jet and his friends live.
Brooms Town	Robocar Poli	EBS	A fictional town of anthropomorphic cars and humans.
Bubbletucky	Bubble Guppies	Nick Jr. Channel	The seven little mermaids live in this town and the main location of the series.
Bubble Town	Cubix	4Kids	A town where live the robots with humans.
Bumblescum, Alabama	Family Guy	Fox	Bumblescum is a town in the Deep South and the main setting of episode To Love and Die in Dixie. The population of the town is 48.
Bumblyburg	VeggieTales and Larryboy: The Cartoon Adventures	Big Idea Entertainment	The main setting for the LarryBoy episodes and TV series.
Bums City, Schwanzas	Boschwanza & Puffalo Bill	Amor Film	A city in the wild west.
Burrillville, Rhode Island	Family Guy	Fox	The main setting of the episode "Road to the North Pole".
C
Camberwick Green, Trumptonshire	Camberwick Green	BBC 1	Camberwick Green is an English town in the fictional county of Trumptonshire that serves as the setting for the eponymous 1966 series. Camberwick Green is a short distance from the equally fictional villages of Trumpton and Chigley.
Camp Wawanakwa, Ontario	Total Drama	Fresh TV	A rundown summer camp located somewhere in Muskoka, Ontario that served as the main setting for Total Drama Island, Total Drama: Revenge of the Island, and Total Drama All-Stars.
Canterlot, Capital Region	My Little Pony: Friendship Is Magic	Discovery Family	The ancient capital of the nation of Equestria, built on the mountains in the center of the country. The city was the original hometown of main protagonist Twilight Sparkle and her family.
Canterlot, Capital Region	My Little Pony: Equestria Girls	Discovery Family	An alternate dimension counterpart of Equestria and the main location of the spin-off franchise.
Canyon Valley, USA	Wylde Pak	Nickelodeon	A fictional city and the main setting of the series.
Cape Suzette	TaleSpin	Disney Channel	The main setting of the series.
Capital Ville	Captain Biceps	Futurikon	Capital Ville is a fictional town and the main setting of Captain Biceps.
Cappy Town, Dream Land	Kirby: Right Back at Ya!	4Kids	A village where Cappies live.
Care-a-Lot	Care Bears (all versions)	MoonScoop Group	The magical land of the Care Bears, made of clouds in the sky.
Célesteville	Babar	Nelvana	The capital of Babar's Kingdom where the titular elephant lives.
Cheesebridge, Norvenia	The Boxtrolls	Laika	Cheesebridge is a fictional hill-top Victorian era town, located in the fictional European country of Norvenia, and the main setting of the film.
Chestervale	Henry's World	Family	A fictional town where Henry Wiggins lives. Probably located in Ontario.
Chigley, Trumptonshire	Chigley	BBC 1	Chigley is a quiet English village in the fictional county of Trumptonshire that serves as the setting for the eponymous 1969 series. Chigley is a short distance from the equally fictional villages of Camberwick Green and Trumpton.
Christmastown, North Pole	Rudolph the Red-Nosed Reindeer	CBS	The main setting of the TV special where Rudolph, Hermey, Yukon Cornelius and Clarice live.
Chuggington	Chuggington	Disney Junior	The main setting of the show where Wilson, Koko, and Brewster live.
City Base	Les Petites Sorcières	Millésime Productions, TF1, D'Ocon Films Productions	The fictional town where the little witches live.
Circus Town	JoJo's Circus	Disney Junior	Main setting of the show.
City, California.	Regular Show	Cartoon Network	City is a fictional city located in California and the main setting of Regular Show. It is heavily based on Los Angeles.
Clamburg	Making Friends	Nickelodeon	Clamburg is a fictional town and the main setting of Making Friends. It is implied to be a fishing village that serves as a tourist destination.
Cloudsdale, Capital Region	My Little Pony: Friendship Is Magic	Discovery Family	An Equestrian city populated by pegasi, built in the clouds with Greco-Roman architecture. Contains a colosseum for air shows and a large factory and work force responsible for producing and managing the country's weather. It is the original home of two main characters, Rainbow Dash and Fluttershy.
Coolsville, Ohio	Scooby-Doo	ABC	An American town where Scooby-Doo and the members of Mystery Inc. live. It was unnamed in the original Scooby-Doo, Where Are You! television series, occasionally referred to as the "County", but was given the name Coolsville starting with A Pup Named Scooby-Doo, and has since been integrated into later properties of the franchise including its comics as well as the second live-action film Scooby-Doo 2: Monsters Unleashed, where it places the town in the state of Ohio.
Cornbury, Canada	Supernoobs	Cartoon Network, Teletoon	Cornbury is a fictional town and the main setting of the Supernoobs.
Crazytown, USA	Crazytown	Paramount Pictures	
Crystal Cove, California	Scooby-Doo! Mystery Incorporated	Cartoon Network	The main setting of the show.
Crystal Tokyo	Sailor Moon Crystal	Viz Media	Crystal Tokyo is a fictional city presumably located in Japan in Sailor Moon Crystal and replaces Azabu-Jūban in the future.
Crushington Park	Bigfoot Presents: Meteor and the Mighty Monster Trucks	Discovery Family	Crushington Park is a fictional town and the main setting of Bigfoot Presents: Meteor and the Mighty Monster Trucks. Everyone living in Crushington Park is a monster truck.
Cubic Pink Planet	Mini Mani	minika ÇOCUK	Two siblings passionate about learning new things - Mini, a girl and Mani, a boy - live on a cube-shaped planet. As the duo travels in outer space, their ship breaks down and they force-land on Earth, on the backyard of the house Neşe, a girl of seven, lives with her family. This accidental landing turns out be quite a blessings for them since Neşe - whose father is an astrophysicist and mother, a teacher - is a kid of great intelligence and learning. It is thus that Mini and Mani gradually become familiar with our planet in a manner as entertaining as educational, thanks to Neşe's responses to their questions about the Earth.
D
Danville, USA	Phineas and Ferb and Milo Murphy's Law	Disney Channel	Danville is a fictional town located in Jefferson County, Tri-State Area, and is the main setting of the two series.
Danger City	Kangoo	TF1	A fictional city in the Kangoo stories.
Deepinaharta, Texas	Wacky Races and Super-Rabbit	CBS and Warner Bros. Pictures	Located in the state of Texas, it is the finish line of the race for the episode "Scout Scatter". Its name is based on popular country song about Texas, "Deep in the Heart of Texas". Deepinaharta also appears in Super-Rabbit, as the birthplace of Cottontail Smith (the main villain of Super-Rabbit).
Deika City, Aichi	My Hero Academia	MBS TV and ytv	Located in Aichi Prefecture, Chūbu region. Base of operations for the Meta Liberation Army and later the Paranormal Liberation Front after the Army merged with the League of Villains. The name of the city is a reference to D'Qar, a fictional planet in Star Wars: The Force Awakens
Dillydale	The Mr. Men Show	Chorion, Renegade Animation	The city where Mr. Men and Little Miss reside.
Dimmadelphia, Indiana	The Fairly OddParents: A New Wish	Nickelodeon	The fictional town of Dimmadelphia is home to the main cast in The Fairly OddParents sequel A New Wish, including the Wells family and several former Dimmesdale residents.
Dimmsdale, California	The Fairly OddParents	Nickelodeon	The fictional town of Dimmsdale is located in Northern California and is home to the main cast of The Fairly OddParents, including the Turners.
Ding-a-Ling Springs	Numb Chucks	YTV	Ding-a-Ling Springs is a fictional town and also the main setting of Numb Chucks.
Dinkletown	Veggietales	Big Idea Entertainment	Dinkletown is one of the settings in the episode The Toy that Saved Christmas
Dog City	Dog City	FOX / Teletoon	Dog City is a fictional city populated by anthropomoprhic dogs and the main setting of the show of same name.
Dolphin City, Australia	H₂O: Mermaid Adventures	ZDF Enterprises	An Australian city where the main trio of girls live.
Downtown City	Littlest Pet Shop	Hasbro	A fictional city similar to New York, and Blythe Baxter's hometown.
Drake City	Mysticons	Nickelodeon, Nicktoons, YTV	A city where four young girls who are mysticons live.
Duckburg, Calisota	DuckTales (1987) and DuckTales (2017)	Disney Channel (and Disney XD for the 2017 series)	Duckburg is a large coastal city in the fictional state of Calisota that serves as the home of Donald Duck, Scrooge McDuck, Huey, Dewey, and Louie, Daisy Duck, and most of their supporting cast. Duckburg was first mentioned in Walt Disney's Comics and Stories #49 in 1944, and was created by Carl Barks.
Duckhurst	Fetch the Vet	CITV	Duckhurst is a town of Fetch the Vet
Duck Town, Pondgea	Breadwinners	Nickelodeon	Duck Town is a large town which resembles a city, and a town where SwaySway and Buhdeuce deliver a lot of their bread to. Everybody living in Duck Town is a photorealistic duck. Duck Town is said to contain a bad area called the "Lower Yeast Side", a spoof of New York City's Lower East Side.
Ducktown	Sitting Ducks	Cartoon Network	Ducktown is a town populated by anthropomorphic ducks where Bill lives. There is also the neighboring town of Swampwood that is populated by anthropomorphic alligators where Aldo lives.
E
East Gackle	What's with Andy?	Teletoon	East Gackle is a fictional town where Andy Larkin and his friend Danny Pickett lives.
Echo Creek, California	Star vs. the Forces of Evil	Disney XD	A fictional Los Angeles community where the main characters reside when they are not involved in their inter-dimensional adventures.
El Dorado	The Road to El Dorado	DreamWorks Animation	El Dorado is the legendary city of gold believed to be in the New World. It is portrayed as a utopian civilization that combines facets of the Aztecs, Maya, Incas, and Atlantis, and located in Ecuador or El Salvador.
Endsville, USA	The Grim Adventures of Billy & Mandy	Cartoon Network	Endsville is a fictional city and the main setting of The Grim Adventures of Billy & Mandy. In FusionFall, it is stated that the city is near Mexico and within 300 miles of the settings of Ed, Edd n Eddy (Peach Creek) and Codename: Kids Next Door (Sector V).
Element City	Elemental	Walt Disney Pictures and Pixar	Element City is a fictional city and the main setting of Elemental. It was inspired by New York City (and other US cities), Amsterdam, and several Chinese cities such as Hong Kong.
Elkford, British Columbia	Braceface	YTV	Elkford is a fictional town and the main setting of Braceface.
Elmore, California	The Amazing World of Gumball	Cartoon Network	The main setting of the show, largely based on Vallejo, Solano County, California.
Elwood City, USA	Arthur	PBS	Elwood City is a town that serves as the main setting of Arthur.
Esuha City, Kansai	My Hero Academia	MBS TV and ytv	Located in the Kansai region (in the Honshu island, Japan), Esuha City is inspired by Osaka, Japan, the most populous city of the Kansai region. The name of the city may be a reference to Mos Espa, a Tatooine spaceport in the Star Wars saga.
Exclamation, USA	Clone High	MTV	Located somewhere in the United States, the city of Exclamation is home to a secret experiment of the United States Army in which they created teenage clones of famous historical figures.
F
Fair City	WordGirl	PBS	The main location of the series.
Farbaro	The Problem Solverz	Cartoon Network	The main setting of the show.
Fizz City	Mr. Magoo	Xilam	A town where Mr. Magoo lives.
Friendly Falls, Canada	Ned's Newt	Teletoon	The main setting of the show. It is located somewhere in Canada according to the flag at Ned's school.
Friendly Falls	Sunny Day	Nickelodeon	The main setting of the show and the hometown of Sunny, Rox and Blair.
Frostbite Falls, Minnesota	The Rocky and Bullwinkle Show	ABC	Located in the state of Minnesota, this city is the hometown of Rocky and Bullwinkle and has a population of only 48 inhabitants.
Frowntown	Unikitty!	Cartoon Network	Master Frown's hometown and is right next to the Unikingdom.
Fish City	Fish Police	Hanna-Barbera	A fictional city in the ocean.
Furfuri Nagar	Motu Patlu	Nickelodeon India	A fictional Indian town, which was once a dense forest, a desert, a village, an empire, a junkyard, a market square, a city of Muslims, a British state, and a place where military training was given. Now it is a small town with 1336 residents, among them, 600 are educated. In the future it will be a tech city full of cars. Before that, cars will extinct humans as shown in the episode Ajab Furfuri Nagar Ki Gazab Kahani. It is the town where the protagonists Motu and Patlu reside.
G
Galaxy Hills	Fanboy & Chum Chum	Nickelodeon	The fictional hometown of Fanboy and Chum Chum, and the main setting of the show. It is home to a school, a comic book/collectible shop, and Fanboy and Chum Chum's favorite convenience store, the Frosty Mart.
Galloping Grove	Corn & Peg	Nick Jr. Channel	The hometown of Corn and Peg.
Gardenia	Winx Club	RAI / Nickelodeon / Rainbow S.r.l.	A fictional town where Bloom and her foster parents live.
Genius Grove	Dexter's Laboratory	CN	Genius Grove is a fictional town and the main setting of Dexter's Labroatory.
Gimmelshtump, Drusselstein	Phineas and Ferb	Disney Channel	It is the Eastern European location in which Dr. Doofenshmirtz was born.
Glickersville	Rated A for Awesome	YTV, Disney XD	Glickersville is a fictional town where Lester, Noam, Lars, Thera and Twitchy live.
Gloomsville	Ruby Gloom	YTV	Gloomsville is a fictional town and the main setting of Ruby Gloom.
Granville	The Littles	ABC Entertainment, DIC Audiovisuel	A fictional town where Henry Big and the Littles live.
Gravesfield, Connecticut	The Owl House	Disney Channel	It is the hometown of series protagonist Luz Noceda.
Gravity Falls, Oregon	Gravity Falls	Disney Channel, Disney XD	The titular fictional town of Roadkill County, Oregon in which the series takes place.
Greasegun, Texas	Wacky Races	CBS	It is the city of the finish line of the race of the episode "Oils Well That Ends Well". It is portrayed as a typical Texas city, mainly because it is shown to be a city with a strong oil industry.
Great Big City	Pinky Dinky Doo	Noggin	The main setting of the show.
Great Lakes City	The Casagrandes	Nickelodeon	
Greendale, England	Postman Pat	BBC1 and Children's BBC	Greendale is a village in Cumbria.
Greenville, California	The Goode Family	ABC	A fictional town in California in which the series takes place.
Griffin Rock	Transformers: Rescue Bots	Hasbro	Griffin Rock is the series' primary setting.
H
Handsprings, Wyoming	Wacky Races	CBS	Located somewhere unknown in Wyoming, Handsprings is a city known for its warm and desert climate. It's also the birthplace of Chief Crazy Buffalo, a notorious Native American chief.
Happy Palms	George and Martha	HBO / YTV	A fictional town where the main characters live. Probably based on Southern Florida.
Harvey Street, Oklahoma	Harvey Street Kids	Netflix	A fictional town in Oklahoma in which the series takes place.
Hasetsu, Saga	Yuri!!! on Ice	TV Asahi	Located in Saga Prefecture (in Kyushu region, Japan), is the Yuuri Katsuki's (the protagonist of Yuri!!! on Ice) hometown
Hawkins, Indiana	Stranger Things	Netflix	A small midwestern town in Roane County, Indiana.
Hazelnut, USA	Pepper Ann	ABC	Hazelnut is a fictional town where Pepper Ann Pearson lives with her family and friends.
Heatherfield	W.I.T.C.H.	Jetix	Heatherfield is a fictional town and the main setting of W.I.T.C.H..
Heartlake City	Lego Friends	Netflix	Heartlake City is the main setting of the Lego Friends theme created by Lego, named after its main body of water, a heart-shaped lake. Heartlake City is 200 years old, as depicted in the episode "Emma's Dilemma".
Herkleton Oaks, Maryland	Craig of the Creek	Cartoon Network	Herkleton Oaks is a fictional town and the main setting of Craig of the Creek. It is bordered by Herkleton Mills to the north.
Hiddenville	The Thundermans	Nickelodeon	
Highland, Texas	Beavis and Butt-head	MTV	Fictional small town said to take place in Texas.
Higglytown	Higglytown Heroes	Disney Junior	The main location of the show.
Hillwood, Washington	Hey Arnold!	Nickelodeon	The main setting of the series. Inspired by Portland, Oregon, Brooklyn, New York City, New York, and Craig Bartlett's hometown Seattle, Washington.
Hosu City, Tokyo	My Hero Academia	MBS TV and ytv	A fictional ward of the Tokyo Metropolis. The name of the city is a reference to Hoth, a fictional planet in the Star Wars saga
I
Imp City, Pride Ring	Helluva Boss	SpindleHorse Toons	Imp City is an urban city in the first circle of Hell with a sizeable population of imps. The Immediate Murder Professionals, an assassination business, is based within the city. The primary setting of the Hazbin Hotel spin-off series.
Ingledale, England	Postman Pat	BBC1 and Children's BBC	Ingledale is a town in Cumbria. The name Ingledale is based on Ingleton.
Inner City, Pennsylvania	Fat Albert	CBS	Fictional small town said to take place in Pennsylvania.
J
Jellystone	Jellystone!	HBO Max	Based on the Hanna-Barbera Yogi Bear series, and the main location of the series.
Jollywood, California	Wacky Races	CBS	Considered the main focus of the racers in the race of the episode "Speeding for Smogland", Jollywood, California is the original Wacky Races parody/version of Hollywood, California
Jollywood	The 7D	Disney XD	The main setting of the show.
Juban, Tokyo	Sailor Moon	Toonami	A fictional city located in Tokyo, and is the main location of the series. Usagi and Chibiusa live in this location.
Jump City, California	Teen Titans and Teen Titans Go!	Cartoon Network / Kids' WB	Jump City is a fictional city where the Teen Titans operate.
Junctionville, New York	'Twas the Night Before Christmas	Rankin/Bass	Junctionville is a fictional town and the main setting of 'Twas the Night Before Christmas.
Junkyardville	The Adventures of Bottle Top Bill and His Best Friend Corky	ABC	
K
Kamino Ward, Kanagawa	My Hero Academia	MBS TV and ytv	A fictional ward of Yokohama, Kanagawa Prefecture, Kantō region. Comprised from parts of the real Minami and Naka wards. The name of the city is a reference to Kamino, a fictional planet in the Star Wars saga.
Kittydale	SuperKitties	Disney Junior	A fictional city where humans and sentient animals reside. It is the home of the feline superhero team known as the SuperKitties.
Knapford	Thomas & Friends	ITV	Knapford is a town on the fictional Island of Sodor, which lies between the Isle of Man and England, and is the main setting of the Railway Series and Thomas and Friends. Knapford railway station is the main station in the TV series.
Kokaua Town, Hawai’i	Lilo & Stitch	The Walt Disney Company	Named by Lilo & Stitch: The Series, Kokaua Town is a small town located in southern Kauai. It is the main setting of the main continuity of the Lilo & Stitch franchise, which consists of four animated films, an animated short film, and the aforementioned TV series. The town is based on Hanapepe, Hawai’i, a real census-designated place in Kauai.
Konohagakure, Land of Fire	Naruto	TV Tokyo	Literally Village Hidden by Tree Leaves. A fictional village where kids learned to be ninjas, and instead of a president, mayor, etc., there is a hokage.
Kuoh Town	High School DxD	AT-X	The semi-main location of the anime series.
L
Lake Hoohaw	PB&J Otter	Playhouse Disney	A fictional town located on a lake which has buildings that are made out of boats, and includes fellow residents like Peanut, Baby Butter and Jelly Otter, the main characters of the series.
Landmark City	A.T.O.M.	Jetix	Landmark City is a metropolitan area with quite a few futuristic elements to it, given the design of various buildings, skyscrapers, infrastructure, transportation, and other presented technology.
Langley Falls, Virginia	American Dad!	FOX, TBS	Langley Falls, Virginia is the fictional community of The Smiths. Its location is in the Washington, D.C. metropolitan area. The town name is a composite of Langley and Great Falls, two unincorporated communities located in Fairfax County, Virginia.
Latchkey Gardens	Stickin' Around	YTV	The main setting of the show.
Lazy Town	Scrub Me Mama with a Boogie Beat	Universal Pictures	Lazy Town is a southern town in the cartoon Scrub Me Mama with a Boogie Beat the population of the town is 1,231.
LazyTown		Nick Jr.	The name of the city is the same as of the show.
Lawndale, USA	Daria	MTV	A suburb of a major city somewhere along the east coast of the United States.
Lemon Twist, Nevada	Wacky Races	CBS	A ghost city located somewhere in the deserts of Nevada, United States.
Littlebark Grove	Harvey Beaks	Nickelodeon	The main setting of the show.
Littleton	Polly Pocket	Mattel, DHX Studios Vancouver	A fictional town where the girls live.
Lizard Gizzard Gulch	The Woody Woodpecker Show	ABC, NBC and Syndication	Located somewhere in the Wild West, this town of 246 people is so violent that it lost 12 sheriffs in 12 days (one sheriff killed per day) and per minute, 2 people are killed per day (When Woody Woodpecker arrived in this city before becoming sheriff of this city, the population that was 246 inhabitants dropped to 244 inhabitants, since 2 inhabitants had been assassinated at once because of the violence of the Wild West).
Limoeiro, Southeast Region	Monica's Gang	GLOBO, Cartoon Network (Latin America)	The fictional neighborhood of Monica's Gang, and the main setting of the show. It was located in the city of São Paulo, Southeast Region, Brazil. A real city named Limoeiro exists in Pernambuco state, near capital city, Recife.
Lundgren	Sanjay and Craig	Nickelodeon	The fictional town and the main setting of Sanjay and Craig.
M
Manehattan, Celestial Coast	My Little Pony: Friendship Is Magic	Discovery Family	A large metropolitan city in the nation of Equestria. A parody of Manhattan, New York City, New York.
Maple Town	Maple Town	Toei Animation	Fictional town with anthropomorphic animal townspeople.
Mariland	My Melody & Kuromi	Netflix	A fictional city and the main setting of the series.
Marzipan City	Chowder	CN	Marzipan City is a fictional food-themed town. Marzipan City sits upon an orphaned chunk of earth which is held up by a giant deity known as Hunk, a parody of Atlas.
Megadale	SheZow	TEN	Megadale is a fictional town and the main setting of SheZow.
Meow City	44 Cats	Rai YoYo	
Mercado, Mexico	Be Cool, Scooby-Doo!	Cartoon Network / Boomerang	Located somewhere in the interior of Mexico, Mercado is a small Mexican town that hides a treasure filled with gold that was stolen by an infamous outlaw known as El Bandito.
Meridian	W.I.T.C.H.	ABC Family, France 3, Jetix	The main city where the Guardians operate.
Metro Town	League of Super Evil	YTV	Metro Town is a fictional town and the main setting of League of Super Evil.
Metro City	Inspector Gadget	DIC	Metro City is a fictional city and the main setting of Inspector Gadget. In the live-action films, Metro City is named Riverton, Michigan.
Middleton, USA	Kim Possible	Disney Channel	Fictional US town where the titular protagonist lives. It is one of the three cities in the Tri-City Area, the other two being Upperton and Lowerton.
Middlington	Growing Up Creepie	Discovery Family	Middlington is a fictional town and the main setting of Growing Up Creepie.
Miracle City	El Tigre: The Adventures of Manny Rivera	Nickelodeon	The main setting of the show, based after Mexico City.
Misora	Ojamajo Doremi	TV Asahi	Misora is the name of the city, you can know that by the school being called Misora Elementaru School.
Mission Hill	Mission Hill	The WB	Mission Hill is a fictional town and the main setting for the show of the same name.
Mitakihara City	Puella Magi Madoka Magica	Shaft	The primary setting of the series
Mixopolis	Mixels	Cartoon Network	The second main setting of the series.
Monsterland	Happy Monster Band	Playhouse Disney	The main location of the series.
Monte Macabre	Victor and Valentino	Cartoon Network	Monte Macabre is a fictional town that serves as the main setting of Victor and Valentino.
Moose Jaw Heights, Saskatchewan	Atomic Betty	TT	Moose Jaw Heights is a fictional neighborhood of the real life city of Moose Jaw, Saskatchewan in Canada, and serves as the main setting of Atomic Betty.
Mordhaus	Metalocalypse	Adult Swim	Morhaus is a fictional town that serves as the setting of Metalocalypse.
Morioh, M Prefecture	JoJo's Bizarre Adventure	TMX	Morioh is a fictional coastal town located in the fictional S City, M Prefecture, Japan from the JoJo's Bizarre Adventure manga series. Both the fourth and eighth part of these series (Diamond is Unbreakable and JoJolion, respectively) take place here. Morioh is based on creator Hirohiko Araki's hometown of Sendai.
Mossy Bottom Farm	Shaun the Sheep	CBBC	Mossy Bottom Farm is the fictional farm that serves as the setting of the series. It is part of a city hardly seen in the series. However, it is featured in the films: in Shaun the Sheep Movie (2015), it is simply "The Big City"; in A Shaun the Sheep Movie: Farmageddon, (2019) it is known as "Mossingham".
Mösen City, New Mösico	Boschwanza & Puffalo Bill	Amor Film	A city in the wild west.
Muckledunk	Bunsen Is a Beast	Nickelodeon	Muckledunk is the series' primary setting.
Mustard Spread, Arkansas	Wacky Races	CBS	Mustard Spread, Arkansas is the location of first race ever of Wacky Races.
Musutafu, Shizuoka	My Hero Academia	MBS TV and ytv	Located near Tokyo, Japan, Musutafu is the main setting of My Hero Academia franchise and where Izuku Midoriya (the main protagonist of My Hero Academia) resides in and goes to school at. The name of the city is a reference to Mustafar, a fictional planet in the Star Wars saga
N
Nanairogaoka	Smile PreCure!	TV Asahi	Known as Rainbow Hills in Glitter Force, and is the hometown of the five main Cures
Nearburg	CatDog	Nickelodeon	Nearburg is a fictional city and the main setting of CatDog.
Neo City	Secret of Cerulean Sand	Telecom Animation Film, TMS Entertainment	A town where living a tyrant named Mr. Harry who are got the real identity William.
New Ficka, Kalifummeln	Boschwanza & Puffalo Bill	Amor Film	
New New York, New York	Futurama	Fox, Comedy Central	The City of New New York has been built over the ruins of present-day New York City, referred to as "Old New York". Various devices and architecture are similar to the Populuxe style. Global warming, inflexible bureaucracy, and substance abuse are a few of the subjects given a 31st-century exaggeration in a world where the problems have become both more extreme and more common.
New Salem	Monster High	Mattel	New Salem is a fictional town that serves as the main setting of Monster High.
Ninjago City, Ninjago	Ninjago	WILFilm, Erik Wilstrup	Ninjago City is the capital of Ninjago Island and serves as the main setting of the Ninjago series.
Noahs, Arkansas	Wacky Races	CBS	Located in a secret place in Arkansas, this city is home to one of the United States Army's fictional bases.
Norrisville	Randy Cunningham: 9th Grade Ninja	Disney XD	Norrisville is a fictional town based on Bartlesville, Oklahoma and the main setting of the show. According to the show's tumblr post, "Norrisville is west of Flackville and just north of East Speezleton."
Nowhere, Kansas	Courage the Cowardly Dog	Cartoon Network	The city of Nowhere consists of almost nothing, the only landmark shown is the Bagge household. It is located in the state of Kansas.
O
Ocean Palisades, California	Totally Spies	YTV	Ocean Palisades is a seaside town in the episode The O.P..
Ocean Shores, California	Rocket Power	Nickelodeon	Ocean Shores is a fictional Southern Californian beachside town where the main characters live. Its landmarks include a pier with an amusement park and the Shore Shack restaurant, Rocket Beach, the main beach in town, and Madtown, a popular local skatepark.
Orbit City	The Jetsons	ABC	Orbit City is a fictional futuristic city in the Earth's atmosphere and the main setting of The Jetsons.
Orchid Bay City	The Life and Times of Juniper Lee	Cartoon Network	The main setting of the series. It is inspired by San Francisco, California, where series creator Judd Winick lives.
Oogai Town	DokiDoki! PreCure	TV Asahi	The main setting of the series. It is known as Seashell Bay in the series' English dub, Glitter Force Doki Doki.
O-Town	Rocko's Modern Life	Nickelodeon	O-Town is a fictional city populated by anthropomorphic animals and the main setting of Rocko's Modern Life. It is most likely based on Chicago, Illinois, as the city is located close to the Illinois-Wisconsin border.
Ouigee Falls	Moville Mysteries	YTV	Ouigee Falls is a town that is home to frequent paranormal activity and phenomena where the main characters live.
P
PaRappa Town	PaRappa the Rapper	Fuji TV	The main setting where PaRappa, Sunny, PJ, Katy, Matt and Paula live.
Peaceville	Grojband	Cartoon Network, Teletoon	Peaceville is a fictional town and the main setting of Grojband.
Peach Creek	Ed, Edd n Eddy	Cartoon Network	A fictional town located somewhere in North America where much of the series takes place.
Pencaster, England	Postman Pat	BBC1 and Children's BBC	Pencaster is a town in Cumbria. It is based on the town of Lancaster.
Pentagram City, Pride Ring	Hazbin Hotel	SpindleHorse Toons, A24	Pentagram City (or The Pentagram) is a massive urbanized city in the center of the first circle of Hell inhabited by demons both native to Hell and those formerly human. The main roadways are laid in the shape of a pentagram, and common establishments are casinos, nightclubs, adult film studios, brothels, restaurants, television stations, and hotels. The primary setting of the series.
Petropolis, California	T.U.F.F. Puppy	NICK	The city was populated by anthropomorphic animals, where the T.U.F.F. agents live. It is located in the state of California. Some buildings in the city have a shape resembling common animals.
Pineville	Jingle All the Way	HC	A fictional town that serves as the main setting of Jingle All the Way.
Pleasant Hills	The Replacements	Disney Channel	A typical American town and the show's main location where Riley, Todd, and their parents live there.
Polyneux, Delaware	Whatever Happened to... Robot Jones?	CN	The main setting of the series, located in Delaware in the 1980s.
Pontypandy, Wales	Fireman Sam	HIT Entertainment	A fictional town located in Wales that serves as the main setting of Fireman Sam.
Ponyville, Capital Region	My Little Pony: Friendship Is Magic	DF	Ponyville is a small town in Equestria, populated by all kinds of ponies. It is the main setting of the show, and where the main characters live. The town's look and style was inspired by medieval towns. It is the hometown of many characters, including main characters Applejack and Rarity.
Popples City	Popples	Netflix	The fictional city of the popples.
Porkbelly	Johnny Test	Cartoon Network	Porkbelly is a fictional town and also the main setting of Johnny Test. It is alternately located in Ontario, British Columbia, or California, depending on the flag displayed at Johnny's school.
Prickly Pines	Camp Lazlo	Cartoon Network	The town where Camp Kidney and Acorn Flats are located.
Q
Qing Qing City, China	My Hero Academia	MBS TV and ytv	Chinese: 中国 軽慶市. Qing Qing City was the site of the first known Quirk (superpower), with a baby there being born with the ability to glow.
Quahog, Rhode Island	Family Guy	FOX	The town is modeled after Cranston, Rhode Island.
R
Radiator Springs, USA	Cars	Walt Disney Pictures, Pixar	Radiator Springs is a composite of multiple places in various states on U.S. Route 66. In Cars its geographic position (in "Carburetor County" as displayed on a map during a flashback) resembles that of Peach Springs, Arizona.
Republic City	The Legend of Korra	Nickelodeon	Republic City is the capital of the United Republic of Nations, founded following the events of Avatar: The Last Airbender. Much of The Legend of Korra is set in this city.
Rescue Rangers Headquarters	Chip 'n Dale: Rescue Rangers	Disney Channel (Season 1)	The main setting of the series.
Retroville, Texas	Jimmy Neutron: Boy Genius and The Adventures of Jimmy Neutron: Boy Genius	Nickelodeon	Retroville is a fictional city and is the main setting for the film Jimmy Neutron: Boy Genius and its subsequent TV series The Adventures of Jimmy Neutron: Boy Genius. It has a school, the amusement park Retroland, and some other buildings.
Rhyboflaven	Mighty Magiswords	Cartoon Network	Rhyboflaven is the main setting of Mighty Magiswords, and is located in the land of Lyvsheria. The land resembles medieval England and other ancient places, with some elements from role-playing games such as The Legend of Zelda, and some more modern attributes such as the fast-food restaurant, Slugburger. The land is named after riboflavin, aka Vitamin B2, which is found in broccoli, the signature food in Castle Rhyboflavin.
Rich-and-fancy-ville	Boy Girl Dog Cat Mouse Cheese	Cloudco Entertainment, WatchNext Media, Kavaleer Productions	A fictional town where Lady Fancydarling lives.
Rigor Mortis, Arizona	The Woody Woodpecker Show	ABC, NBC and Syndication	Known as "The Original One Hearse Town", this small town in the state of Arizona is one of the most violent cities in the Wild West, due to the fact that Buzz Buzzard (one of the most dangerous outlaws in the Wild West) killed all 273 verifies that this small town ever had.
Rintis Island	Boboiboy	TV3	Boboiboy and friends' hometown.
Roarsville	Henry Hugglemonster	Disney Junior	Roarsville is a town which is the main setting of Henry Hugglemonster. Everyone living in Roarsville is a monster.
Rock Springs, Wyoming	Wacky Races	CBS	A fictional town in the state of Wyoming, Rock Springs is the host of third Grand Prix of the original Wacky Races.
Rocky Road, Rhode Island	Wacky Races	CBS	Located near the capital of Rhode Island, Providence, Rocky Road has an urban environment and a very difficult racing circuit.
Royal Woods, Michigan	The Loud House	Nickelodeon	A fictional town located in Michigan. It is based on Royal Oak, Michigan, birthplace of series creator Chris Savino.
S
Saint Canard	Darkwing Duck	Disney Channel	Saint Canard is the fictional city that serves as the home of Darkwing Duck, the titular hero of his show. It is in the same continuity as Duckburg above and likely in the same fictional state of Calisota; Launchpad had moved there prior to the opening episodes of Darkwing Duck, and Duckburg hero Gizmoduck made guest star appearances. The city sits on Audubon Bay, with Darkwing's secret lair atop a catenary tower of the Audubon Bay Bridge, and features an exaggerated central skyline of large skyscrapers. The city's name "Canard" is the French word for duck.
Saint Martin	Belle and Sebastian		
San Angel, Mexico	The Book of Life	20th Century Studios	This fictional little town located in Mexico is the main setting of the 2014 animated film "The Book of Life"
Santa Cecilia, Mexico	Cars 3 and Coco	Walt Disney Pictures and Pixar	This Mexican city was inspired by Oaxaca City, Oaxaca, Mexico and first appeared in Cars 3 as the birthplace of Gabriel, one of the secondary characters of this film, and is the main setting of 2017 film Coco.
Seaside by the Seashore, New York	Arlo the Alligator Boy and I Heart Arlo	Netflix and Titmouse, Inc.	A seaside neighborhood in Brooklyn and the main setting of the TV series, having been restored by Arlo and his gang. It is inspired by Coney Island.
Sheetrock Hills	Handy Manny	Disney Junior	The main location of the show, in which Manny Garcia, his tools, his assistant Kelly, and his neighbor Mr. Lopart live.
Shelbyville, USA	The Simpsons	FOX	Shelbyville is a town next to, and somewhat similar to, Springfield.
Sheltered Shrubs	As Told by Ginger	Klasky-Csupo, Nickelodeon	A fictional town where Ginger Foutley and her friends live.
Shuggazoom City	Super Robot Monkey Team Hyperforce Go!	Jetix	A city where the SRMTHFG characters are from. (Descriptions and networks from are likely not needed.)
Singletown	Monster Buster Club	Jetix	A fictional town that serves as the main setting for Monster Buster Club.
Slipover	Wacky Races	CBS	Located in New Jersey, it is a city known for its amusement parks, including its most famous and popular amusement park, Holiday Park.
Sombertown	Santa Claus Is Comin' to Town	ABC	A gloomy city run by the dictatorial Burgermeister Meisterburger.
Sooga Village	Pucca	Disney XD	Sooga Village is a town that is the main setting of Pucca.
South Park, Colorado	South Park	Comedy Central	A fictional small town of South Park, located within the real life South Park basin in the Rocky Mountains of central Colorado. The town is also home to an assortment of frequent characters such as students, families, elementary school staff, and other various residents, who tend to regard South Park as a bland and quiet place to live. South Park's art and visual style was heavily inspired by the town Fairplay in Colorado.
Splittsboro	Sidekick	YTV	Splittsboro is a fictional town and the main setting of Sidekick.
Springdale	Yo-kai Watch	Disney XD	Japanese: さくらニュータウン Sakura Nyū Taun. The hometown of Nate. The location of the town is inconsistent: located in somewhere in the Chūgoku, Kansai, Kantō, or Shikoku regions in original Japanese media; and in either Georgia or the New England area in English localizations.
Springfield, USA	The Simpsons	FOX	Springfield is the fictional town in which the American animated sitcom The Simpsons is set. A mid-sized town in a comedically undetermined state of the United States, Springfield acts as a complete universe in which characters can explore the issues faced by modern society. The geography of the town and its surroundings are flexible, changing to address whatever an episode's plot calls for. Springfield's location is impossible to determine; the series is deliberately evasive on the subject, providing contradictory clues and impossible information about an actual geographic location.
Stickyfeet	The Buzz on Maggie	Disney Channel	The main location of the series.
Stormalong	The Marvelous Misadventures of Flapjack	Cartoon Network	The main location of the series.
Sunset Beach, British Columbia	Stoked	YTV	Sunset Beach is a resort town located in British Columbia where Reef, Fin, and Emma arrive to do jobs for the first time alongside locals Broseph, Lo, and Johnny.
Sunny Bay	LoliRock	Marathon Média	A fictional town, where live the trio of girls who protect the planet earth.
Stoolbend, Virginia	The Cleveland Show	FOX	A fictional town in Virginia and Cleveland Brown's hometown. Serves as the main setting of the spin-off series.
Storybrook Village	Super Why!	PBS	A village where Whyatt Beanstalk/Super Why, Princess Pea/Princess Presto, Red/Wonder Red and Pig/Alpha Pig live.
Stylesville	Bratz	4Kids TV	Stylesville is the fictional city in Bratz where the magazine Bratz headquarters is located along with their revivals Your Thing. Not to be confused with the city Stilesville in Indiana, the city is sometimes spelled Stilesville. Bratz and Your Thing go to school at Stiles High School (also known as Stiles High).
Summerfield	Enigma	Millésime Productions, M6, D'Ocon Films Productions	The hero girl lives in this town.
Surfside, California	Maxie's World	DIC	A fictional town where Maxie lives.
Swallow Falls	Cloudy with a Chance of Meatballs	Cartoon Network	
Swamp City, USA	Milo Murphy's Law	Disney XD	A fictional town located near Danville (the main setting of Phineas and Ferb) where this series takes place.
Swellview	Henry Danger	Nickelodeon	Is a name pun on Bellevue from Washington state.
T
Table Town	Kiff	Disney Channel	The main location for the show. It is located somewhere in South Africa.
Tarrytown	Jay Jay the Jet Plane	PBS	The main location for the show, known for its Tarrytown Airport.
Titten Town, Fikxas	Boschwanza & Puffalo Bill	Amor Film	A town in the wild west.
ToddWorld	ToddWorld	Mike Young Productions	A fictional town where Todd, Benny, Sophie, Stella, and Pickle live.
Tolucaville	The Tom and Jerry Show	Warner Bros. Animation	A main fictitious setting that only appears in "The Cat and Mouse Detectives" segment.
Townsville	The Powerpuff Girls	CN	Townsville is a fictional major city complete with its own Little Tokyo. Located at the coordinates 32°N by 212°W, an implausible coordinate in reality. (Note: The closest approximation, 32°N by 148°E, would place Townsville in the Pacific Ocean, several hundred kilometers southeast of Japan.)
Toyland	Noddy	Enid Blyton	A world of toys.
Tremorton	My Life as a Teenage Robot	Nickelodeon	A fictional futuristic town, a parody of Trenton, New Jersey. Likely named after the apparent earthquakes that happened in the area, as the city maintains its first Richter scale as a historic artifact.
Trulliland	Trulli Tales	Nick Jr.	The main setting of the show that is based on the real world city of Alberobello.
Trumpton, Trumptonshire	Trumpton	BBC 1	Trumpton is an English market town in the fictional county of Trumptonshire that serves as the setting for the eponymous 1967 series. Trumpton a short distance from the equally fictional villages of Camberwick Green and Chigley.
U
Umi City	Team Umizoomi	Nick Jr.	Main setting of the series.
Undertown	Ben 10: Omniverse	Cartoon Network	An underground city beneath Bellwood inhabited by a variety of aliens.
Underworld	The Baskervilles	Teletoon	The darkness town controlled by the governor Nicolas Lucifer III.
Unicity	The Dog and Pony Show	Treehouse TV	
W
Wayouttatown, Oregon	The Angry Beavers	Nickelodeon	A fictional town located in Oregon.
Wheelford	Ricky Zoom	Nick Jr. Channel	The main setting of the show.
Wilson Way	Foster's Home for Imaginary Friends	Cartoon Network	Wilson Way is a fictional town where the titular Foster's Home for Imaginary Friends is located and set. It is also the hometown of both Young Man Rivers, and his grandfather, Old Man Rivers.
Woodcrest, Maryland	The Boondocks	AS	A fictional town located in Maryland (specified to be a suburb of Baltimore in the original comic strip).
Wuzzleburg	Wow! Wow! Wubbzy!	Nick Jr. Channel	Main setting of the series.
Y
Yardley	Mighty Bug Five	Nick Jr.	
Yergöğü	Sagun	TRT Çocuk	
Z
Zahramay Falls	Shimmer and Shine	Nick Jr. Channel	The main location for the second season and a minor location in the first season. Shimmer, Shine, Leah, Zac, Zeta, Nazboo and the other characters live there.
Zippy, Mississippi	Wacky Races	CBS	Located on the banks of the Mississippi River, Zippy, Mississippi is the main setting for the episode "The Zippy Mississippi Race". It is the location of the finish line of the episode's race and is where Colonel Cornpone (a typical southern colonel) resides.
Zootopia	Zootopia	Walt Disney Pictures	The titular location of the film. Renamed Zootropolis in some regions.
Z Şehri	Z Takımı	TRT Çocuk	3 teenagers (Arda, Efe & Ela) protect the city from Bay B (Mr. B), the villain of this cartoon.
