= P81 =

P81 may refer to:

- Consolidated Vultee XP-81, an American experimental fighter aircraft
- HMAS Acute (P 81), a patrol boat of the Royal Australian Navy
- HMS Varne (P81), a submarine of the Royal Navy
- INS Katchall (P81), a corvette of the Indian Navy
- Papyrus 81, an early copy of the New Testament in Greek
- P81, a state regional road in Latvia
