= Spirit prison =

Spirit prison may refer to:

- Spirits in prison, a recurrent minor subject in the writings of Christianity
- a concept in the spirit world according to the Latter Day Saint movement
