= First circle of hell =

As depicted in Dante's Inferno

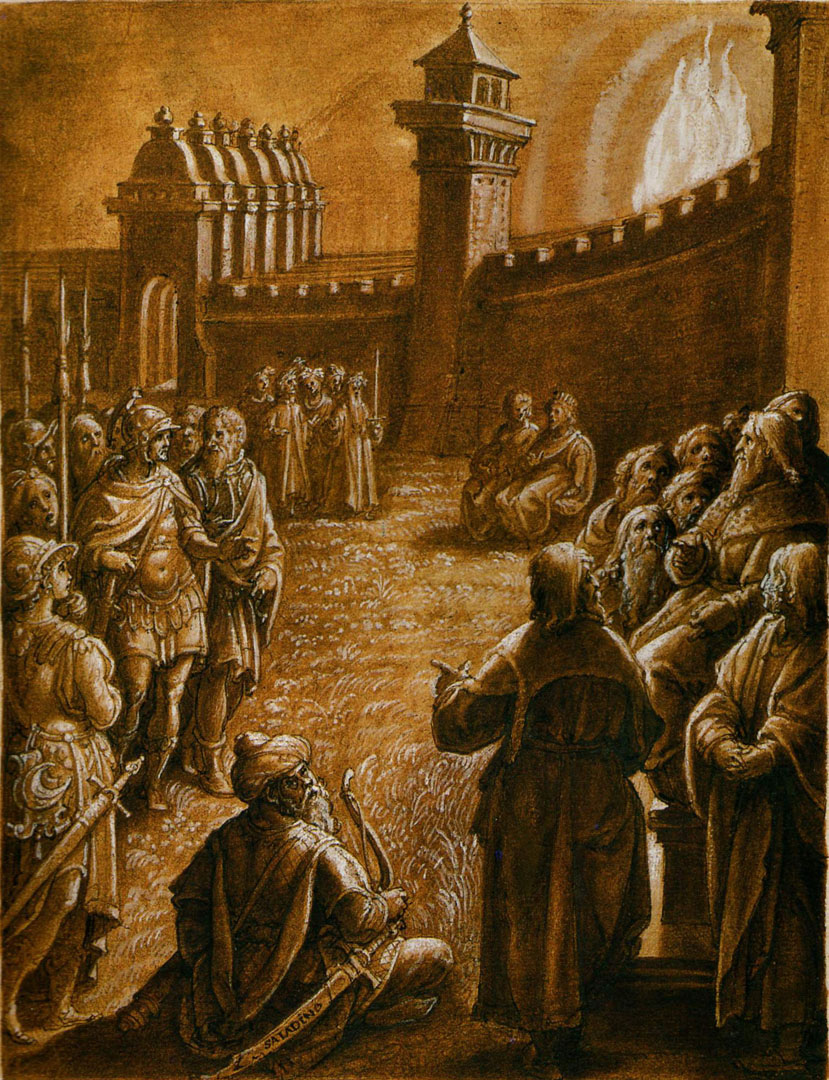
The castle in the first circle of hell, as illustrated by Stradanus

The first circle of hell is depicted in Dante Alighieri's 14th-century poem Inferno, the first part of the Divine Comedy. Inferno tells the story of Dante's journey through a vision of hell ordered into nine circles corresponding to classifications of sin. The first circle is Limbo, the space reserved for those souls who died before baptism and for those who hail from non-Christian cultures. They live eternally in a castle set on a verdant landscape, but forever removed from heaven.

Dante's depiction of Limbo is influenced by contemporary scholastic teachings on two kinds of Limbo—the Limbo of Infants for the unbaptised and the Limbo of the Patriarchs for the virtuous Jews of the Old Testament; the addition of Islamic, Greek, and Roman historical figures to the poem is an invention of Dante's, which has received criticism both in his own time and from a modern perspective. Dante also uses his depiction of Limbo to discuss the Harrowing of Hell, using the motif to explore the concept of predestination.

== Synopsis ==
Here, as mine ear could note, no plaint was heard
except of sighs, that made the eternal air
tremble, not caused by tortures, but from grief
felt by those multitudes, many and vast,
of men, women, and infants.

— Canto IV, lines 24–28

Inferno is the first section of Dante Alighieri's three-part poem Commedia, often known as the Divine Comedy. Written in the early 14th century, the work's three sections depict Dante being guided through the Christian concepts of hell (Inferno), purgatory (Purgatorio), and heaven (Paradiso). Inferno depicts a vision of hell divided into nine concentric circles, each home to souls guilty of a particular class of sin.

Led by his guide, the Roman poet Virgil, Dante enters the first circle of hell in Inferno's Canto IV. The first circle is Limbo, the resting place of souls who "never sinned" but whose "merit falls far short". Here Dante meets the souls of the unbaptised, of virtuous pagans and those who lived before the time of Christ; Hellenistic and Roman figures including Homer, Horace, Hector, and Lucius Junius Brutus, as well as Islamic scholars and nobility such as Saladin, Avicenna, and Averroes. Within Limbo is a great castle surrounded by seven walls; Dante passes through its seven gates to reach the verdant meadows where the first circle's souls dwell.

The souls in Limbo are not punished directly, but are condemned to "suffer harm through living in desire"; their punishment is to be left desirous of salvation. Upon hearing of this, Dante inquires of Virgil whether anyone has ever attained such salvation; Virgil recounts the Harrowing of Hell, the story of Jesus descending after his death to recover the souls of biblical figures who had foretold his coming, such as Abraham, David, and Jacob. Dante then begins to recount the names of scholars and philosophers he sees among the noble pagans, but is cut short by their numbers, and is pressed by Virgil to continue into the second circle.

== Background ==
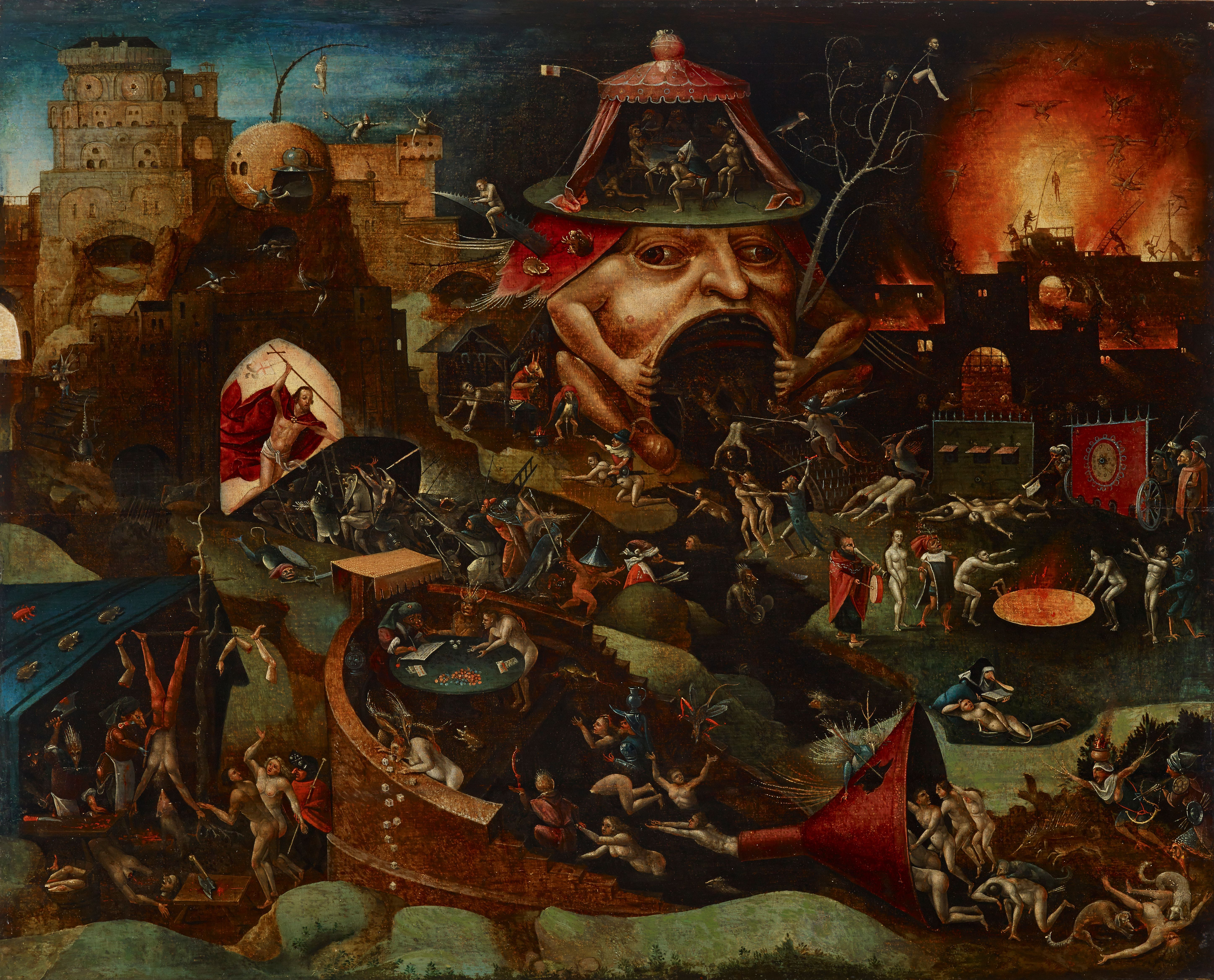
A 16th-century depiction of the Harrowing of Hell by a follower of Hieronymus Bosch

Dante's Limbo is modelled after the Ancient Greek concept of Elysium, the part of the Greek underworld reserved for those in classical mythology who had lived good lives. Scholastic philosophy in Dante's time held two distinct theories of Limbo—the Limbo of Infants for the unbaptised and the Limbo of the Patriarchs for the virtuous Jews of the Old Testament; the latter of which has been equated to the biblical Bosom of Abraham. Dante's depiction melds both of these notions of Limbo into one realm. The placement of the unbaptised in hell dates back to Augustine of Hippo's 5th-century Enchiridion on Faith, Hope and Love, who believed that they would be punished for the original sin. By Dante's lifetime, Alexander of Hales had taught that they would not be tormented in hell, but would be excluded from heaven. Dante makes specific mention of several figures already placed in hell in the writings of Thomas Aquinas—Greek philosophers Socrates and Plato, who here are likewise in hell but not among the ranks of the damned.

Prominently discussed within the canto is the concept of the Harrowing of Hell, or the descent of Jesus Christ into Limbo to free the souls of the Patriarchs, prominent Jewish figures of the Old Testament. This event is not explicitly described in the bible, but had been confirmed as Catholic doctrine in the century before Dante's writing, first in the Fourth Council of the Lateran (1215) and again in the Second Council of Lyon (1274). The Harrowing had been a popular motif in European drama and art during the Middle Ages, its imagery derived from the apocryphal 5th-century Gospel of Nicodemus.

== Analysis ==
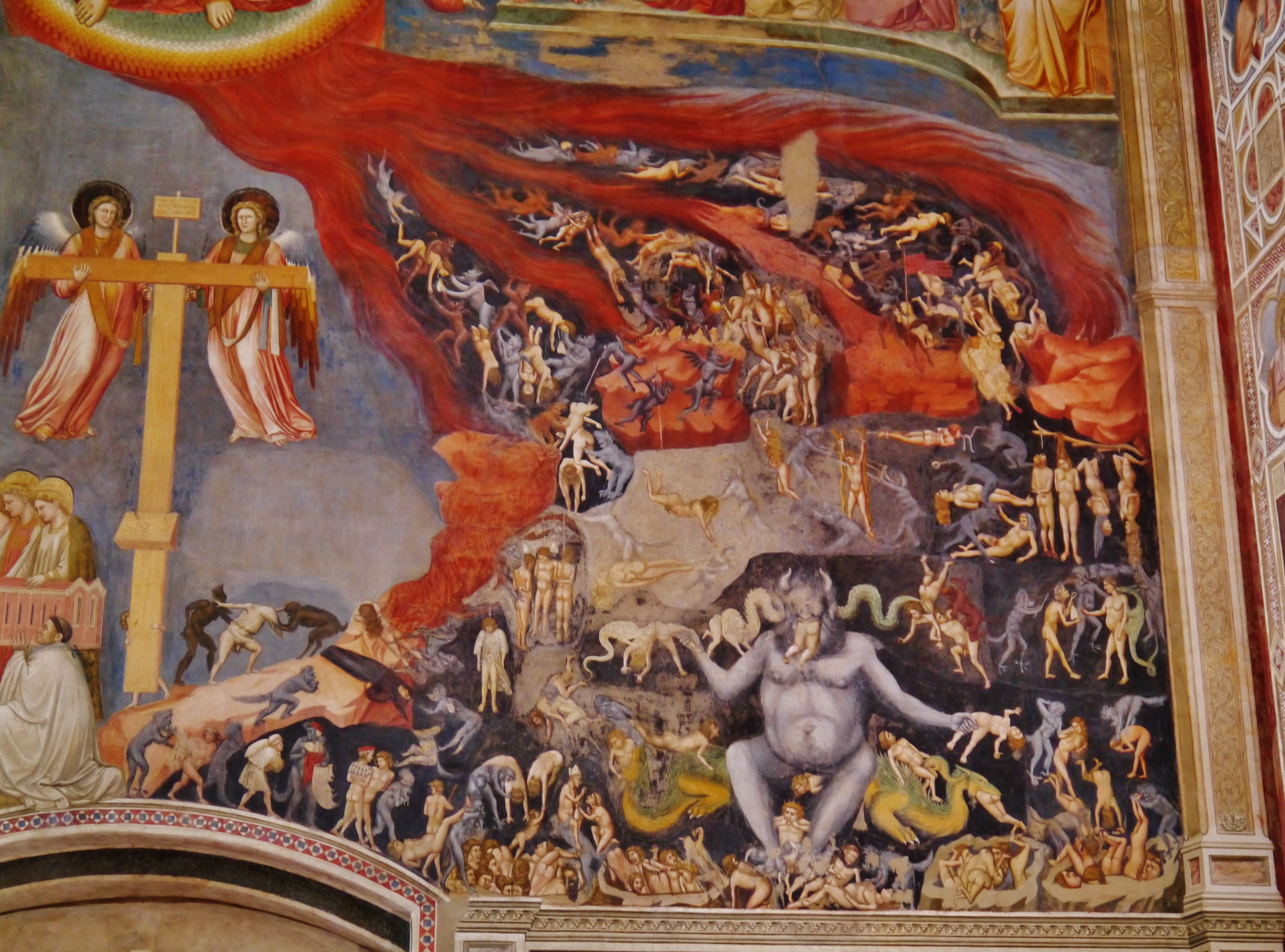
Dante's orderly vision of hell is in contrast to disorderly, chaotic depictions such as this contemporary fresco by Giotto.

Dante's depiction of hell is one of order, unlike contemporary representations which, according to scholar Robin Kirkpatrick, were "pictured as chaos, violence and ugliness". Kirkpatrick draws a contrast between Dante's poetry and the frescoes of Giotto in Padua's Scrovegni Chapel. Dante's orderly hell is a representation of the structured universe created by God, one which forces its sinners to use "intelligence and understanding" to contemplate their purpose. The nine-fold subdivision of hell is influenced by the Ptolemaic model of cosmology, which similarly divided the universe into nine concentric spheres.

Although Dante's views on sin are heavily influenced by Aristotle's Nicomachean Ethics, the first circle of hell, as an eternal home to the unbaptised and pagans, represents a uniquely Christian addition to Aristotle's classification of ethics, which Dante otherwise mirrors. Scholar Wallace Fowlie also remarked upon Limbo being disconnected from the rest of Dante's hell, writing that "Dante the poet and Dante the man are in conflict here [...] he is content to draw pictures as best he can of a dignified scene". Fowlie believed that the depiction of the first circle was Dante's attempt to "rescue [...] from ignominy" non-Christian figures who could not be placed in heaven by theology, including influential philosophers and poets who informed Dante's own work. Dante's depiction of Limbo later informed Alexander Solzhenitsyn's 1968 novel In the First Circle; Solzhenitsyn draws a parallel between the virtuous pagans and the inhabitants of the gulag system as both having committed no sin.

Contemporary reaction to this treatment of pagan figures was not positive; 14th-century commentators on Dante such as Guido da Pisa and Francesco da Bruti were critical of it, and even Giovanni Boccaccio, a follower of Dante, was unwilling to defend it without caveats. Modern interpretation of Dante's Limbo sees it as an examination of predestination; Amilcare A. Iannucci contrasts the specific mention of the Harrowing, which rescued only biblical figures from the first circle, to the "noble castle" left behind in Limbo, populated by figures from Greco-Roman antiquity who Dante believes "would certainly have been Christians" had they not predated Christianity. The effect of this contrasting imagery, Iannucci writes, is to turn the traditionally jubilant image of salvation associated with the Harrowing legend into one of pity and compassion for those denied it by predestination. Dante's treatment of Islamic figures was discussed by Syrian academic Samar al-'Aṭṭār in the 2018 paper "Divided Mediterranean, Divided World: The Influence of Arabic on Medieval Italian Poetry", in which she drew attention to the paradoxical placement of Muslims within the Divine Comedy. Later in Inferno, the Islamic prophet Muhammad and his son-in-law Ali are depicted among the lowest bounds of hell, while Paradiso sees Christian participants in the largely unsuccessful Second Crusade against Islam placed in heaven. Despite this, Saladin, the commander who recaptured the Crusader States from Christendom, is depicted as a virtuous soul in Limbo, as is the philosopher Averroes, who had been denounced by Thomas Aquinas in the 13th century. Aṭṭār sees this as evidence that Dante "may have detested everything about Arabs and Muslims. But at the same time, he seems to have admired everything about them."

== Footnotes ==
=== References ===
- Alighieri, Dante (1998). Albertini, Stefano (ed.). Inferno. Translated by Cary, Henry Francis. Wordsworth Editions. ISBN 978-1-853-26787-1.
- Alighieri, Dante (2013). Kirkpatrick, Robin (ed.). Inferno. Penguin Classics. ISBN 978-0-141-39354-4.
- Attar, Samar (Summer 2018). "Divided Mediterranean, Divided World: The Influence of Arabic on Medieval Italian Poetry". Arab Studies Quarterly. 40 (3). Pluto Journals: 197–212. doi:10.13169/arabstudquar.40.3.0197. JSTOR 10.13169/arabstudquar.40.3.0197.
- Fowlie, Wallace (1981). A Reading of Dante's Inferno. University of Chicago Press. ISBN 978-0-226-25888-1.
- Iannucci, Amilcare A. (1995). "Dante's Inferno, Canto IV". Dante's Inferno: The Indiana Critical Edition. pp. 299–309. in Musa (1995)
- Marenbon, John (2015). "Virtuous Pagans, Hopeless Desire and Unjust Justice". Vertical Readings in Dante's Comedy. pp. 77–95. in Corbett & Webb (2015)
- Corbett, George; Webb, Heather Mariah, eds. (2015). Vertical Readings in Dante's Comedy. Open Book Publishers. ISBN 978-1-78374-172-4.
- Musa, Mark, ed. (1995). Dante's Inferno: The Indiana Critical Edition. Indiana University Press. ISBN 978-0-253-01240-1.
