= First Epistle of Peter =

Book of the New Testament

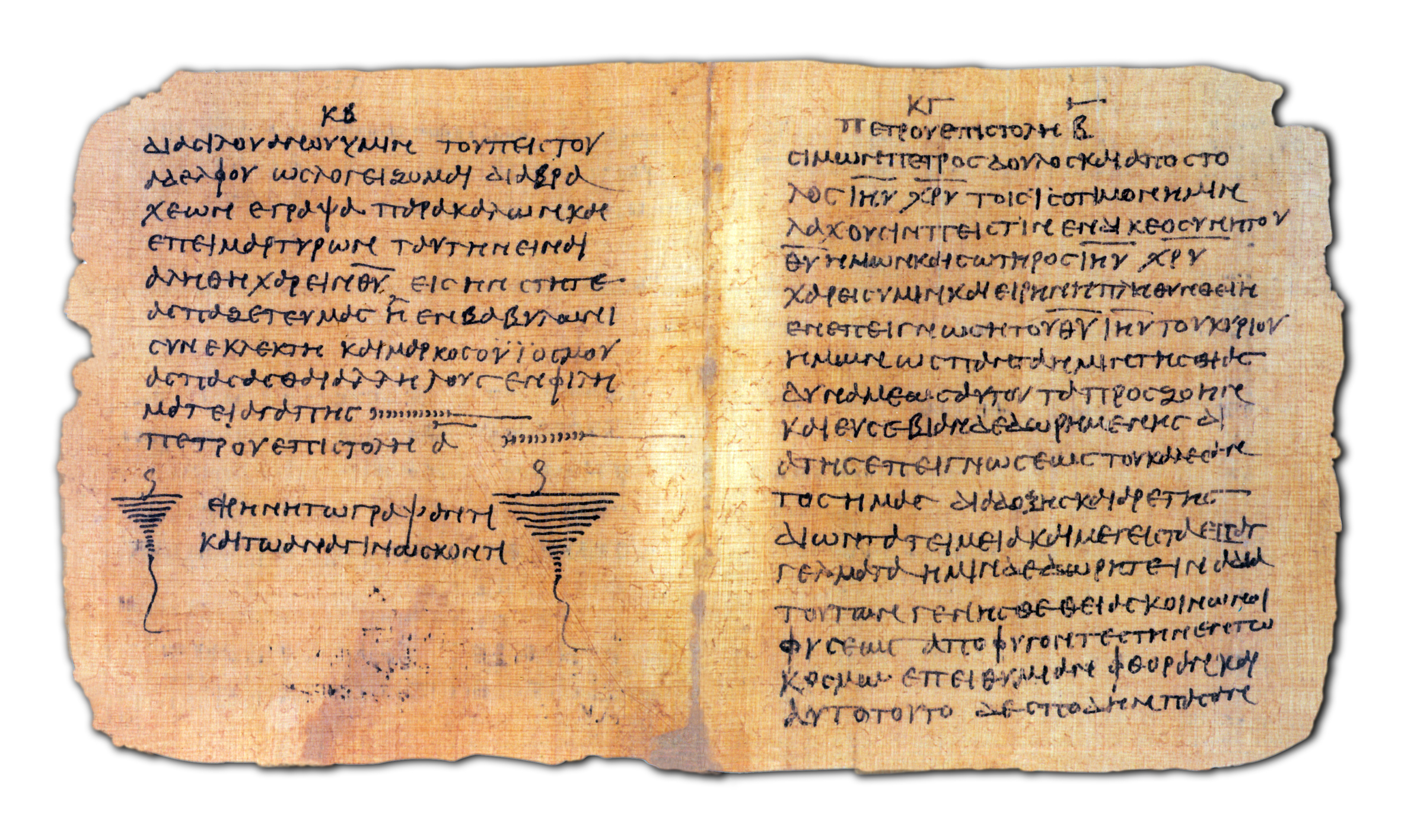
1 Peter 5:11–14, continuing on to 2 Peter on Papyrus 72 (c. AD 300)

The First Epistle of Peter (Note: The book is sometimes called the First Letter of Peter, or simply 1 Peter. It is most commonly abbreviated as "1 Pet.") is a book of the New Testament. The author presents himself as Peter the Apostle. The ending of the letter includes a statement that implies that it was written from "Babylon", which may be a reference to Rome. The letter is addressed to the "chosen pilgrims of the diaspora" in Asia Minor suffering religious persecution.

Although both the text and tradition identifies Peter as its author, most scholars conclude that the epistle is an expression of the Christian tradition at Rome associated with Peter rather than the apostle himself. Scholars debate whether its persecution refers to social discrimination or official Roman oppression. The letter also discusses the “Harrowing of Hell” and instructions for wives to submit to their husbands, alongside exhortations for husbands to treat their wives with respect.

== Authorship ==
The authorship of 1 Peter has traditionally been attributed to the Apostle Peter because it bears his name and identifies him as its author (1:1). Although the text identifies Peter as its author, most scholars conclude that the epistle is an expression of the Christian tradition at Rome associated with Peter rather than the apostle himself. Many scholars argue that Peter was not the author of the letter because its writer appears to have had a formal education in rhetoric and philosophy, and an advanced knowledge of the Greek language, none of which would be usual for a Galilean fisherman.

New Testament scholar Graham Stanton rejects Petrine authorship because 1 Peter was most likely written during the reign of Domitian in AD 81, which is when he believes widespread Christian persecution began, which is long after the death of Peter. More recent scholars such as Travis Williams say that the persecution described does not appear to be describing official Roman persecutions after Peter's death, thus not directly ruling out an early date for the composition of the epistle.

Another dating issue is the reference to "Babylon" in chapter 5 verse 13, generally agreed to be a claim the letter was written from Rome. It is believed that the identification of Rome with Babylon, the ancient enemy of the Jews, only came after the destruction of the Temple in AD 70. Other scholars doubt Petrine authorship because they are convinced that 1 Peter is dependent on the Pauline epistles and thus was written after Paul the Apostle's ministry because it shares many of the same motifs espoused in Ephesians, Colossians, and the Pastoral Epistles.

Others argue that it makes little sense to ascribe the work to Peter when it could have been ascribed to Paul. Alternatively, one theory supporting legitimate Petrine authorship of 1 Peter is the "secretarial hypothesis", which suggests that 1 Peter was dictated by Peter and was written in Greek by his secretary, Silvanus (5:12). John Elliott disagrees, suggesting that the notion of Silvanus as secretary or author or drafter of 1 Peter introduces more problems than it solves, and claims that the Greek rendition of 5:12 suggests that Silvanus was not the secretary, but the courier/bearer of 1 Peter. Like English translations generally, the more recent NRSVue (2021) translation of this verse from the Greek does not exclude understanding Silvanus as secretary: "Through Silvanus, whom I consider a faithful brother, I have written this short letter to encourage you and to testify that this is the true grace of God. Stand fast in it." Some see Mark as a contributive amanuensis in the composition and writing of the work.

On the one hand, some scholars such as Bart D. Ehrman are convinced that the language, dating, literary style, and structure of this text makes it implausible to conclude that 1 Peter was written by Peter. According to these scholars,1 Peter provides a positive example of early Christian pseudonymity practices.

On the other hand, some scholars argue that there is enough evidence to conclude that Peter did, in fact, write 1 Peter. For instance, there are similarities between 1 Peter and Peter's speeches in the Biblical book of Acts, allusions to several historical sayings of Jesus indicative of eyewitness testimony (e.g., compare Luke 12:35 with 1 Peter 1:13, Matthew 5:16 with 1 Peter 2:12, and Matthew 5:10 with 1 Peter 3:14), and early attestation of Peter's authorship found in 2 Peter (AD 60–160) and the letters of Clement (AD 70–140), all supporting genuine Petrine origin. Scholar Richard Carrier claims that the Epistle dates to the 60s AD and that it may be authentic: he asserts as possible that Peter being an illiterate fisherman was a later invention of the evangelists, and that the historical Peter (attested in the authentic Pauline epistles, which never mention Peter's economic status and education) was actually a learned Hellenized Jew. Karen Jobes recognises the difficulties in suggesting a pseudonymous authorship and ultimately leans towards Peter as the author: 'In the midst of all the debate about authorship, we must remember that the simplest explanation might be the likeliest: that the apostle Peter is the author, with amanuensis assistance a possible but not necessary explanatory factor'. Ultimately, the authorship of 1 Peter remains contested.

== Oldest surviving manuscripts ==
The original manuscript of this letter is lost, as are several centuries of copies. The text of the surviving manuscripts varies. The oldest surviving manuscripts that contain some or all of this book include:

In Coptic

- Crosby–Schøyen Codex MS 193 (3rd century)

In Greek

- Papyrus 72 (3rd/4th century)
- Papyrus 125 (3rd/4th century)
- Papyrus 81 (4th century)
- Codex Vaticanus (325–350)
- Codex Sinaiticus (330–360)
- Codex Alexandrinus (400–440)
- Codex Ephraemi Rescriptus (ca. 450)
- Papyrus 74 (7th century)

In Latin

- León palimpsest (7th century)

== Audience ==
1 Peter is addressed to the "elect resident aliens" scattered throughout Pontus, Galatia, Cappadocia, Asia, and Bithynia. The five areas listed in 1:1 as the geographical location of the first readers were Roman provinces in Asia Minor. The order in which the provinces are listed may reflect the route to be taken by the messenger who delivered the circular letter. The recipients of this letter are referred to in 1:1 as "exiles of the Dispersion". In 1:17, they are urged to "live in reverent fear during the time of your exile". The social makeup of the addressees of 1 Peter is debatable because some scholars interpret "strangers" (1:1) as Christians longing for their home in heaven, some interpret it as literal "strangers", or as an Old Testament adaptation applied to Christian believers.

While the new Christians have encountered oppression and hostility from locals, Peter advises them to maintain loyalty both to their religion and the Roman Empire (1 Peter 2:17).

The author counsels (1) to steadfastness and perseverance under persecution (1–2:10); (2) to the practical duties of a holy life (2:11–3:13); (3) he adduces the example of Christ and other motives to patience and holiness (3:14–4:19); and (4) concludes with counsels to pastors and people (chap. 5).

== Outline ==
David Bartlett uses the following outline to structure the literary divisions of 1 Peter:

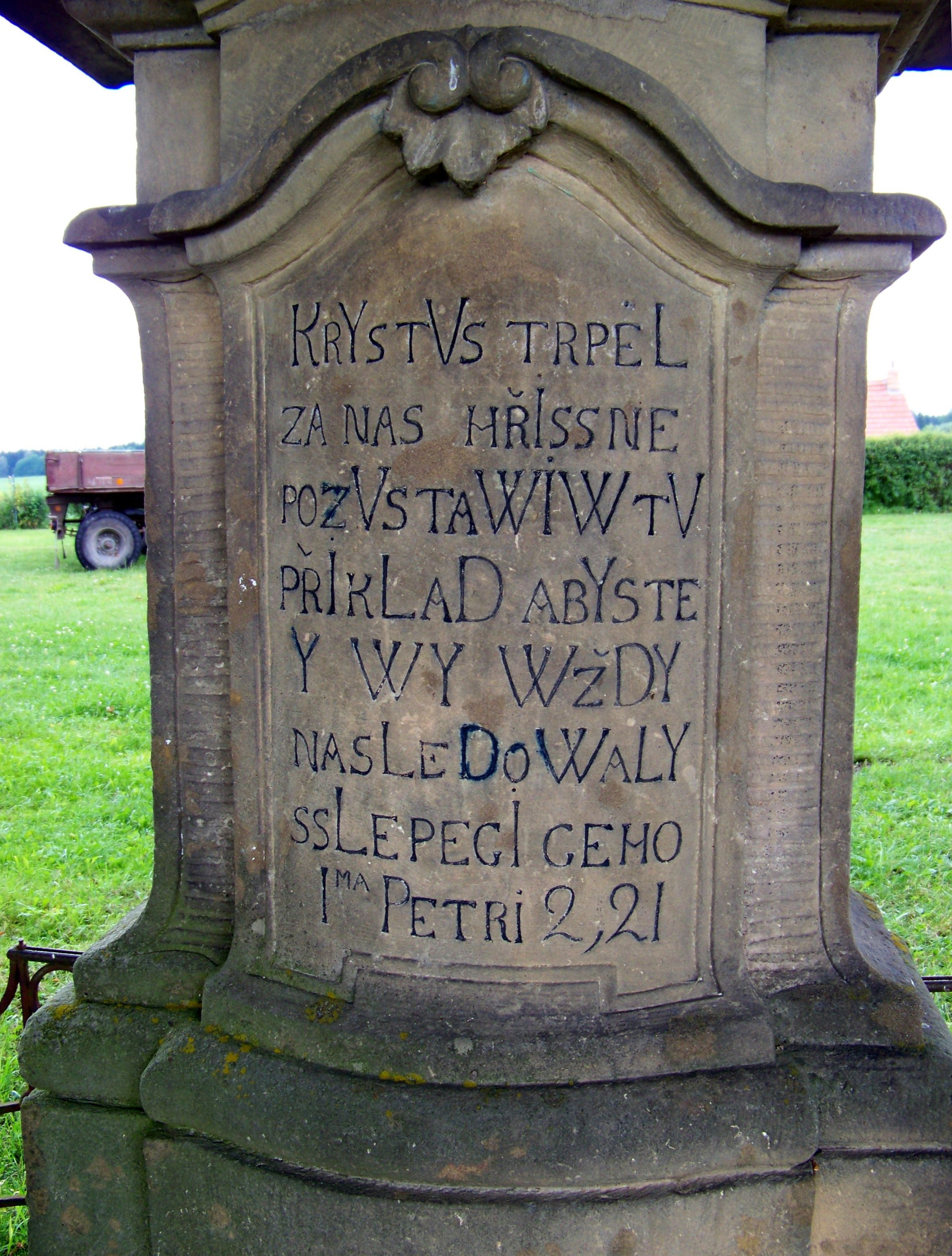
Gravestone in the Czech Republic quoting 1 Peter 2:21 — "To this you were called, because Christ suffered for you, leaving you an example, that you should follow in his steps."

- Greeting (1:1–2)
- Praise to God (1:3–12)
- God's Holy People (1:13–2:10)
- Life in Exile (2:11–4:11)
- Steadfast in Faith (4:12–5:11)
- Final Greeting (5:12–14)

== Context ==
The Petrine author writes of his addressees undergoing "various trials" (1 Peter 1:6), being "tested by fire" (which is not a physical reference but a metaphor for spiritual warfare; 1:7), maligned "as evildoers" (2:12) and suffering "for doing good" (3:17). Based on such internal evidence, biblical scholar John Elliott summarizes the addressees' situation as one marked by undeserved suffering. Verse 3:19, "Spirits in prison", is a continuing theme in Christianity, and one considered by most theologians to be enigmatic and difficult to interpret.

A number of verses in the epistle contain possible clues about the reasons Christians experienced opposition. Exhortations to live blameless lives (2:15; 3:9, 13, 16) may suggest that the Christian addressees were accused of immoral behavior, and exhortations to civil obedience (2:13–17) perhaps imply that they were accused of disloyalty to governing powers.

However, scholars differ on the nature of persecution inflicted on the addressees of 1 Peter. Some read the epistle to be describing persecution in the form of social discrimination, while some read them to be official persecution.

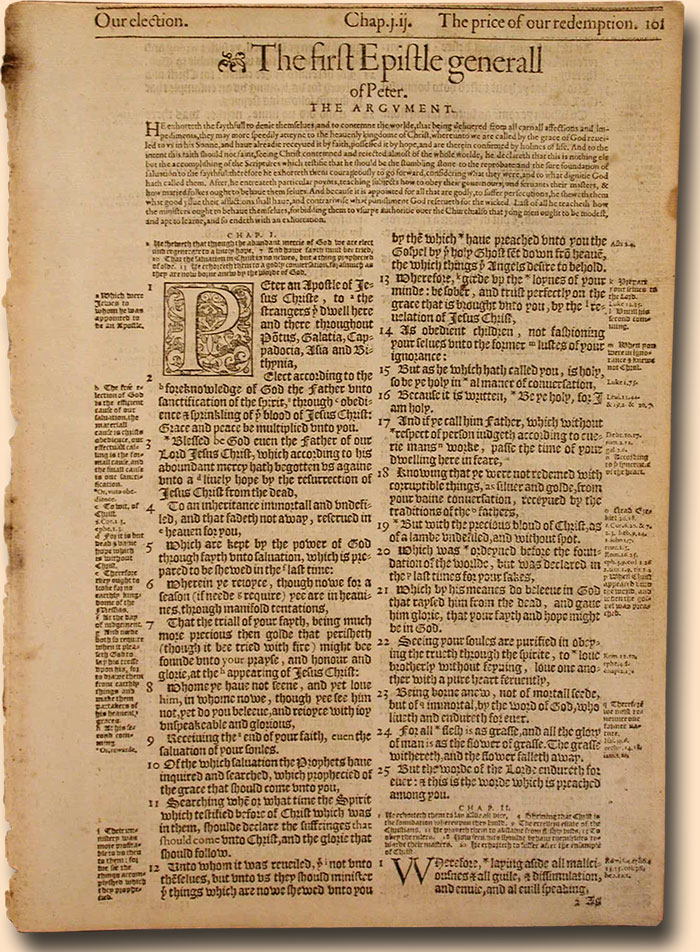
English translation of 1 Peter from the 1578 Geneva Bible

=== Social discrimination of Christians ===
Some scholars believe that the sufferings the epistle's addressees were experiencing were social in nature, specifically in the form of verbal derision. Internal evidence for this includes the use of words like "malign" (2:12; 3:16), and "reviled" (4:14). Biblical scholar John Elliott notes that the author explicitly urges the addressees to respect authority (2:13) and even honor the emperor (2:17), strongly suggesting that they were unlikely to be suffering from official Roman persecution. It is significant to him that the author notes that "your brothers and sisters in all the world are undergoing the same kinds of suffering" (5:9), indicating suffering that is empire-wide in scope. Elliott sees this as grounds to reject the idea that the epistle refers to official persecution, because the first empire-wide persecution of Christians officially meted by Rome did not occur until the persecution initiated by Decius in AD 250.

=== Official persecution of Christians ===
On the other hand, scholars who support the official persecution theory take the exhortation to defend one's faith (3:15) as a reference to official court proceedings. They believe that these persecutions involved court trials before Roman authorities, and even executions.

One common supposition is that 1 Peter was written during the reign of Domitian (AD 81–96). Domitian's aggressive claim to divinity would have been rejected and resisted by Christians. Biblical scholar Paul Achtemeier believes that persecution of Christians by Domitian would have been in character, but points out that there is no evidence of official policy targeted specifically at Christians. If Christians were persecuted, it is likely to have been part of Domitian's larger policy suppressing all opposition to his self-proclaimed divinity. There are other scholars who explicitly dispute the idea of contextualizing 1 Peter within Domitian's reign. Duane Warden believes that Domitian's unpopularity even among Romans renders it highly unlikely that his actions would have great influence in the provinces, especially those under the direct supervision of the senate such as Asia (one of the provinces 1 Peter is addressed to).

Also often advanced as a possible context for 1 Peter is the trials and executions of Christians in the Roman province of Bithynia-Pontus under Pliny the Younger. Scholars who support this theory believe that a famous letter from Pliny to Emperor Trajan concerning the delation of Christians reflects the situation faced by the addressees of this epistle. In Pliny's letter, written in AD 112, he asks Trajan if the accused Christians brought before him should be punished based on the name 'Christian' alone, or for crimes associated with the name. For biblical scholar John Knox, the use of the word "name" in 4:14–16 is the "crucial point of contact" with that in Pliny's letter. In addition, many scholars in support of this theory believe that there is content within 1 Peter that directly mirrors the situation as portrayed in Pliny's letter. For instance, they interpret the exhortation to defend one's faith "with gentleness and reverence" in 3:15–16 as a response to Pliny executing Christians for the obstinate manner in which they professed to be Christians. Generally, this theory is rejected mainly by scholars who read the suffering in 1 Peter to be caused by social, rather than official, discrimination.

== The Harrowing of Hell ==
The author refers to Jesus, after his death, proclaiming to spirits in prison (3:19). This passage, and a few others (such as Matthew 27:52 and Luke 23:43), are the basis of the traditional Christian belief in the descent of Christ into hell, or the harrowing of hell. Though interpretations vary, some theologians see this passage as referring to Jesus, after his death, going to a place (neither heaven nor hell in the ultimate sense) where the souls of pre-Christian people waited for the Gospel. The first creeds to mention the harrowing of hell were Arian formularies of Sirmium (359), Nike (360), and Constantinople (360). It spread through the West and later appeared in the Apostles' Creed.

== Submissiveness of women ==
1 Peter 3:1 instructs women to submit to their husbands, "so that, even if some of them do not obey the Word, they may be won over without a word by their wives' conduct, when they see the purity and reverence of your lives." (NRSV) The author also instructs husbands to "show consideration for your wives in your life together" and pay honor to them, "since they too are also heirs of the gracious gift of life—so that nothing may hinder your prayers."

Similar instructions are repeated in Ephesians 5:21–28, starting with "being subject to one another out of reverence for Christ." (NRSVue), which biblical scholar Craig S. Keener argues as a call to mutual submission.

== See also ==
- Second Epistle of Peter
- Textual variants in the First Epistle of Peter
- Spirits in prison, 3:19.

== Bibliography ==
- Elliott, John (2000), 1 Peter: a new translation with introduction and commentary, Yale University Press.
- Stanton, Graham (2003), Eerdmans Commentary of the Bible, Wm.B. Eerdmans.
- Williams, Travis B. (1 November 2012), Persecution in 1 Peter: Differentiating and Contextualizing Early Christian Suffering, Brill, ISBN 978-90-04-24189-3.

First Epistle of Peter General Epistle
| Preceded by James | New Testament; Books of the Bible | Succeeded by Second Peter |
