= Samar al-'Aṭṭār =

Syrian writer

- Born: 1945 (age 80–81); Damascus
- Occupations: Writer, novelist and translator

Samar al-'Aṭṭār (born 1945) is a Syrian writer, novelist and translator.

== Biography ==
She was born in Damascus and studied at the University of Damascus, earning a BA in Arabic literature and an MA in English, and then received a second MA in English from Dalhousie University. In 1973, she received a PhD from the State University of New York at Binghamton. She taught Arabic and English in Canada, the United States, Algeria and Germany. She later taught Arabic studies at the University of Sydney.

She published her first novel Lina: A Portrait of Damascene girl in 1982. It was followed by The House on Arnus Square in 1988. She translated these two novels into English herself. She has also published scholarly essays, textbooks on teaching Arabic and translations of Arabic poetry.

== Selected works ==
- Attar, Samar (2007). The Vital Roots of European Enlightenment: Ibn Tufayl's Influence on Modern Western Thought. Lexington Books. ISBN 978-0739119891.
