= Spirits in prison =

Recurrent subject in the writings of Christianity

The spirits in prison is a recurrent but minor subject in the writings of Christianity. The concept has its origins in Platonism, and it is introduced in the Phædrus with the idea that the soul is imprisoned within the body.

== Greek philosophy ==
In Plato's Phædrus, Socrates likens the soul of the body to be as imprisoned as an oyster is bound to its shell during the discourse on metempsychosis with Phaedrus.

== Christianity ==
=== First Epistle of Peter ===
The subject takes its starting point from chapter 3 of the First Epistle of Peter:

^{19} εν ω και τοις εν φυλακη πνευμασιν πορευθεις εκηρυξεν ^{20} απειθησασιν ποτε οτε απεξεδεχετο η του θεου μακροθυμια εν ημεραις νωε κατασκευαζομενης κιβωτου εις ην ολιγοι τουτ εστιν οκτω ψυχαι διεσωθησαν δι υδατος
^{19} By which also he (Christ) went and preached unto the spirits in prison; ^{20} Which sometime were disobedient, when once the longsuffering of God waited in the days of Noah, while the ark was a preparing, wherein few, that is, eight souls were saved by water.

However, the Greek word ψυχαι (psyche), used in 1 Peter 3:20, may also be translated as "person" and not as "soul". The latter represents both the inner self and its status after corporal death, whereas in this verse it is used as a synonym of the Jewish word nephesh, in a holistic sense and without any metaphysical dualism. The word psyche is applied by St. Peter uniquely to humans and not for animals.

=== Early Christian interpretations ===
According to Augustine of Hippo the spirits are the unbelieving contemporaries of Noah, to whom the spirit of Christ in Noah preached, or to whom the pre-existent Christ himself preached.

=== Enlightenment views ===
Unitarians such as Thomas Belsham consider that the spirits in prison were simply gentiles in the prison of ignorance to whom Christ preached through his apostles.

=== Modern Christian interpretations ===
Wayne Grudem (1988) identifies five commonly held views on the interpretation of this verse:

- "View 1: When Noah was building the ark, Christ 'in spirit' was in Noah preaching repentance and righteousness through him to unbelievers who were on the earth then but are now 'spirits in prison' (people in Hell)."
- "View 2: After Christ died, he went and preached to people in Hell, offering them a second chance of salvation."
- "View 3: After Christ died, he went and preached to people in Hell, proclaiming to them that he had triumphed over them and their condemnation was final."
- "View 4: After Christ died, he proclaimed release to people who had repented just before they died in the flood, and led them out of their imprisonment (in Purgatory) into Heaven."
- "View 5: After Christ died (or: after he rose but before he ascended into Heaven), he travelled to Hell and proclaimed triumph over the fallen angels who had sinned by marrying human women before the flood."

These views revolve around the identity of the spirits in prison, the time in which the preaching took place, and the content of the preaching:

==== View 1. Augustinian interpretation ====
This is also found in Thomas Aquinas' Summa Theologica (3,52,2). A variant of this view is the view of the Rev. Archibald Currie (1871) that Christ through Noah preached to "the spirits in prison", meaning the eight persons interned in the Ark as in a place of protection.

==== View 2. Harrowing of Hell ====
The Anglican Edward Hayes Plumptre, Dean of Wells, in The Spirits in Prison starting from the verse in Peter argued for revival in the belief in the harrowing of Hell and the spirit of Christ preaching to the souls of the dead in Hades while his body was in the grave.

==== View 3. Proclaiming triumph ====
This is a variant of the harrowing of Hell idea, except that Christ only proclaims triumph.

==== View 4. Release from purgatory ====
This view originates with Robert Bellarmine (1586) and has been followed by some Catholic Church commentators in relation to a belief in Purgatory.

==== View 5. The spirits in prison are angels ====
- Jesus proclaimed triumph over the fallen angels

Support for the understanding that the spirits in prison are angelic beings and not people is thought to be confirmed by II Peter 2:4–5 and Jude 6, which refer to rebellious angels punished by God with imprisonment. Just like I Pet. 3, II Pet. 2 also refers to the time of Noah's flood, including the number of people saved in the ark. However, the text in 2 Peter uses a different word for the location of the angels than I Peter does. in 2 Peter 2, the word used is tartaroo, otherwise known as Tartarus. In I Peter 3:19, the word is phylake (which can also be anglicised as Phylace), meaning prison.

- Angels and the Book of Enoch

Friedrich Spitta (1890), Joachim Jeremias and others suggested that Peter was making a first reference to Enochic traditions, such as found again in the Second Epistle of Peter chapter 2 and the Epistle of Jude. Stanley E. Porter considers that the broad influence of this interpretation today is due to the support of Edward Selwyn (1946).

=== Human souls ===
The concept that the dead await a general resurrection and judgment either in blessed rest or in suffering after a particular judgement at death was a common first century Jewish belief (see Lazarus and Dives and bosom of Abraham). A similar concept is taught in the Eastern Orthodox churches and is reflected in some Early Church Fathers, and was championed by John Calvin (who vigorously opposed Luther's doctrine of soul sleep).

== Other religious traditions ==
In The Church of Jesus Christ of Latter-day Saints, this verse is used in conjunction with 1 Peter 4:6 to support the belief that in the three days between Christ's death and resurrection, he visited the spirit world and set in motion the work of teaching the gospel to those who did not receive it during mortality, providing them the opportunity to repent and accept saving ordinances performed on their behalf in Latter-day Saint temples.

In Islamic tradition, a place called Sijjin is known to be the prison of unbelieving souls. It is also the place of Satan and his fellow devils. Quran exegete Tabari (839–923 CE) commented on sijjin: "it is the seventh and lowest earth (underworld), in which Satan (Iblis) is chained, and in it are the souls (arwah) of the infidels (kufar), while Suyuti (c. 1445–1505 CE) describes it as place of Iblis and his soldiers (Iblis wa junudihi) with the infidels imprisoned.

== See also ==
- Christian views on hell
- Gehenna
- Limbo
- Outer darkness
- Prayer for the dead
- Purgatory
