= Papyrus 81 =

Papyrus 𝔓^{81}
- New Testament manuscript
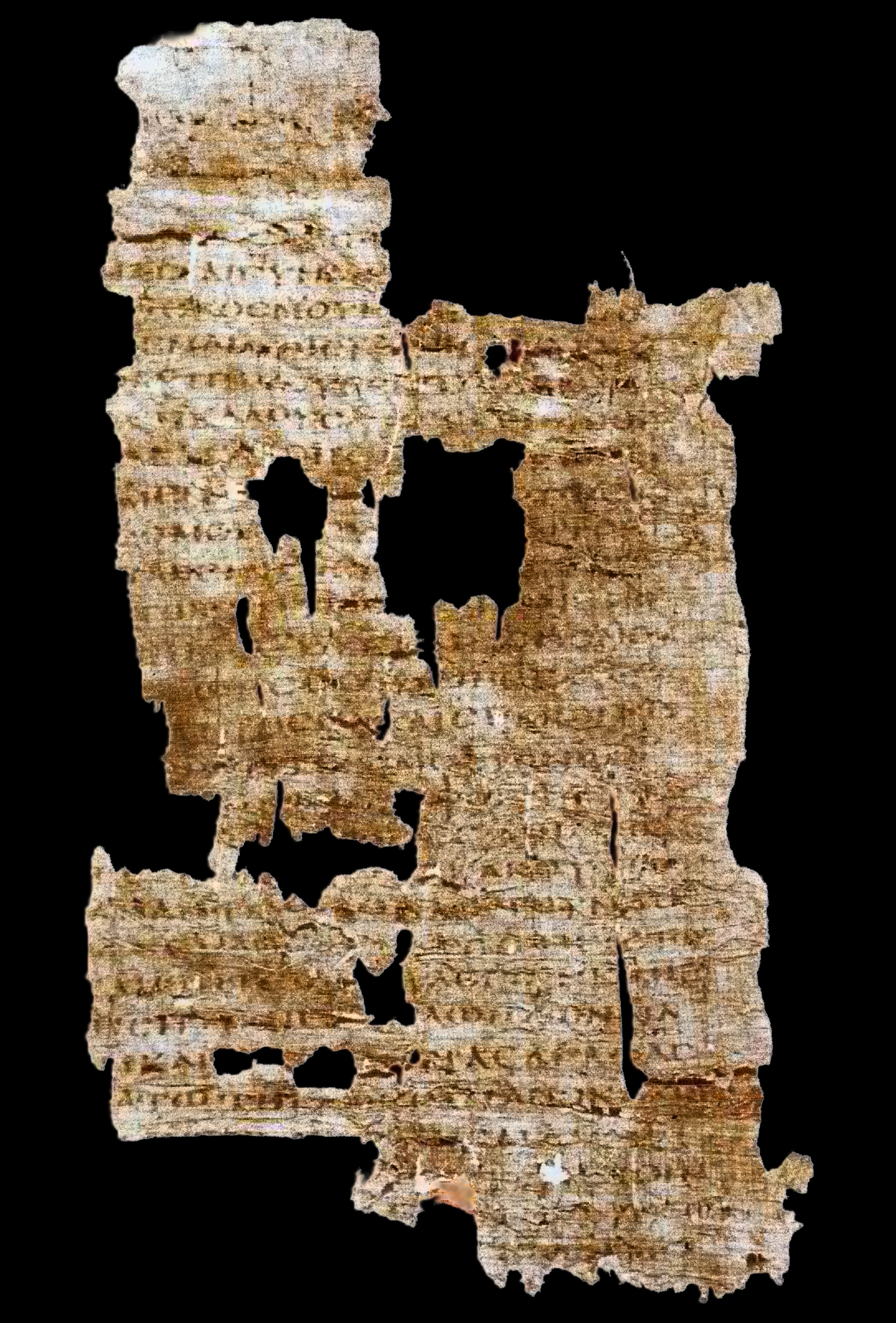
- Recto, 1 Peter 3:4-12
- Text: First Epistle of Peter 2-3 †
- Date: 4th century
- Script: Greek
- Found: Egypt
- Now at: Property S. Daris
- Cite: S. Daris, Un nuovo frammento della prima lettera di Pietro, (Barcelona: 1967), pp. 11-37.
- Size: 22 cm x 12.5 cm
- Type: Alexandrian text-type
- Category: II

Papyrus 81 (in the Gregory-Aland numbering), designated by 𝔓^{81}, is an early copy of the New Testament in Greek. It is a papyrus manuscript of the First Epistle of Peter. The surviving texts of 1 Peter are verses 2:20-3:1,4-12. The manuscript paleographically has been assigned to the 4th century.

Text

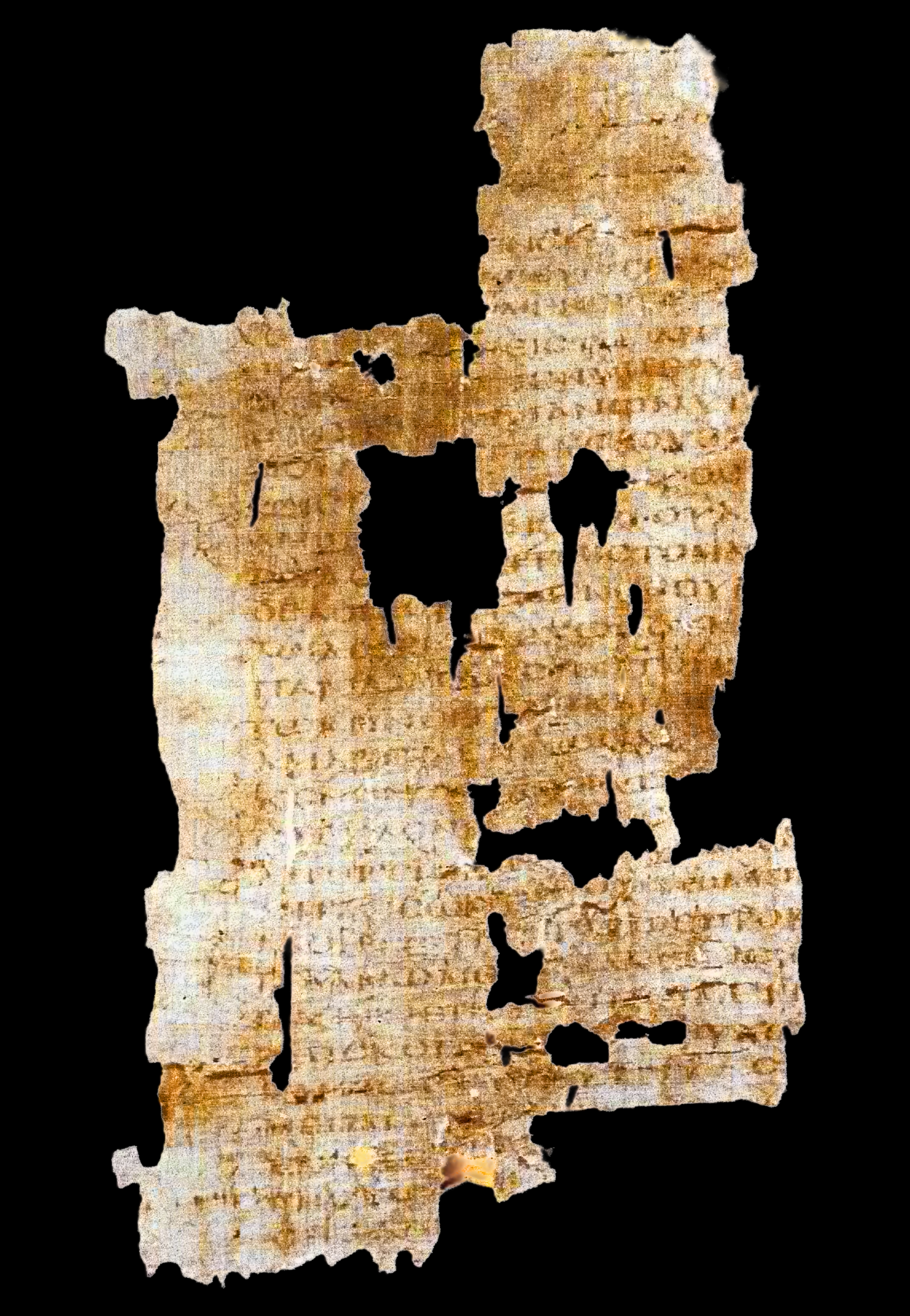
Verso, 1 Peter 2:20-3:1

The Greek text of this codex probably is a representative of the Alexandrian text-type. Aland placed it in Category II.

Location

It is currently housed at the Property S. Daris (No. 20) in Trieste.

== See also ==
- List of New Testament papyri
