= List of county routes in Wyoming County, New York =

County routes in Wyoming County, New York, serve as connections between major routes in the county. Wyoming County does not use the Manual on Uniform Traffic Control Devices-standard yellow-on-blue pentagonal route marker to sign its county routes; however, most county route numbers are listed on street blade signs.

== Routes 1–30 ==
Route	Length (mi)	Length (km)	From	Via	To	Notes
CR 1	9.86	15.87	NY 19 in Warsaw	Buffalo Street and Dale, West Middlebury, and Skates Hill roads	Genesee County line in Middlebury (becomes CR 15A)	
CR 2	6.52	10.49	NY 19 in Gainesville	Broughton and East Lake roads	NY 39 in Castile	Discontinuous at NY 19A
CR 3	8.25	13.28	NY 39 in Castile	Park, Weaver, West Lake, and Suckerbrook roads	US 20A in Perry	
CR 4	6.60	10.62	NY 78 in Wethersfield	Hermitage Road	US 20A / NY 238 in Orangeville	
CR 5	4.76	7.66	NY 77	Church Road in Bennington	Genesee County line (becomes CR 36)	
CR 6	8.60	13.84	NY 39 in Castile	View and Middle Reservation roads	NY 39 in Perry	
CR 7	8.44	13.58	NY 19 in Warsaw	Saltvale Road, Main Street, and East Bethany Road	Genesee County line in Middlebury (becomes CR 35)	
CR 9	6.50	10.46	NY 78 in Sheldon	Perry Road	NY 98 / CR 32 in Java	
CR 10	5.36	8.63	NY 39 in Pike	Hardys Road	NY 78 in Wethersfield	
CR 11	6.43	10.35	NY 98 in Arcade	East Arcade Road	NY 78 in Java	Former routing of NY 98
CR 12	5.79	9.32	CR 7 in Middlebury	LaGrange Road	CR 13 in Perry	
CR 13	8.62	13.87	US 20A in Perry	Simmons and Old State roads	NY 19 in Covington	
CR 14	4.16	6.69	CR 4 in Orangeville	Liberty Street Road	US 20A in Warsaw	
CR 15	1.65	2.66	Erie County line (becomes CR 394)	Holland Road in Java	NY 78	
CR 16	1.38	2.22	CR 13	Old State and Peoria roads in Covington	NY 63	
CR 17	1.48	2.38	CR 46	Centerville Road in Eagle	NY 39	
CR 18	2.12	3.41	CR 6	Schenk Road in Castile	Letchworth State Park	
CR 19	6.95	11.18	NY 238 in Attica	East Main and Vernal roads	CR 1 in Middlebury	
CR 20	4.81	7.74	CR 4	Quakertown and Orangeville Center roads in Orangeville	US 20A / CR 31	
CR 21	3.09	4.97	Allegany County line in Eagle (becomes CR 36)	DeWitt Road	NY 19 / CR 46 in Pike	
CR 22	0.63	1.01	Perry village line	Silver Lake Road in Perry	CR 30	
CR 23	1.48	2.38	NY 19A in Gainesville	Barber Road	CR 3 in Castile	
CR 24	2.84	4.57	NY 19	East Koy Road in Pike	CR 29 / CR 33	
CR 25	1.56	2.51	NY 39	Simmons Road in Perry	US 20A	
CR 26	0.88	1.42	Erie County line (becomes CR 330)	Bullis Road in Bennington	NY 354	
CR 27	4.79	7.71	Erie County line in Arcade (becomes CR 404)	Chaffee Road	NY 98 in Java	
CR 28	8.16	13.13	US 20A in Warsaw	Fisher and Burke Hill roads	CR 13 in Perry	
CR 29	9.54	15.35	Allegany County line in Genesee Falls (becomes CR 27)	Wiscoy, East Koy, and Lamont roads	NY 19 in Gainesville	
CR 30	7.57	12.18	US 20A in Warsaw	Merchant and Oatka roads	NY 246 in Perry	

== Routes 31 and up ==
Route	Length (mi)	Length (km)	From	Via	To	Notes
CR 31	8.76	14.10	US 20A / CR 20 in Orangeville	Orangeville Center and Buffalo roads and Exchange Street	NY 238 in Attica	
CR 32	11.15	17.94	NY 98 in Java	Wethersfield Road	NY 19 in Gainesville	
CR 33	0.65	1.05	Clute Road	Overholt and Graham roads in Pike	CR 24 / CR 29	
CR 34	2.84	4.57	CR 35	Centerline Road in Sheldon	NY 77	
CR 35	9.61	15.47	NY 78 in Sheldon	Dutch Hollow and Folsomdale roads	NY 354 in Bennington	
CR 36	3.06	4.92	CR 3	Castile Center Road in Castile	CR 6	
CR 37	4.04	6.50	NY 39 in Eagle	South and East Hillside roads	CR 10 in Pike	
CR 38	3.79	6.10	NY 39 in Pike	Denton Corners Road	Letchworth State Park entrance in Genesee Falls	Part west of NY 19A overlaps with NY 436
CR 39	1.53	2.46	CR 31	Cascade Road in Attica	CR 42	
CR 40	2.47	3.98	CR 29	School Road in Gainesville	NY 19A	
CR 41			Bennion Road	DeGoyler Road in Castile	CR 6	Number removed mid-1990s; now serves as entrance to Letchworth State Park
CR 42	2.76	4.44	NY 238	Attica Gulf Road in Attica	NY 238	
CR 43	3.84	6.18	CR 2 in Silver Springs	Silver Springs Road	CR 30 in Warsaw	
CR 44	8.81	14.18	NY 98 in Arcade	Curriers Road	NY 78 in Java	
CR 45	4.59	7.39	US 20A in Warsaw	Blackhouse Road	CR 1 in Middlebury	
CR 46	4.70	7.56	CR 17 in Eagle	Telegraph Road	CR 21 in Pike	
CR 47	2.48	3.99	CR 1	West Middlebury Road in Middlebury	CR 7	
CR 48	1.47	2.37	Weber Road	Almeter Road in Orangeville	CR 20	CR 48 was proposed to extend south on Weber Road to CR 32
CR 50	0.84	1.35	NY 19	Water Street in Pike	NY 39	
CR 52			CR 7	West Middlebury Road in Middlebury	Transit Road	Proposed route as of 1998
CR 53	1.78	2.86	NY 19	Starr Road in Covington	Genesee County line (becomes CR 39)	
CR 54			NY 98	Chaffee Road in Java	NY 78	Proposed extension of CR 27 as of 1998
CR 55	0.51	0.82	CR 38	Glen Iris Road in Genesee Falls	Castile town line	Designated as part of NY 357 from c. 1933 to early 1940s; (Note: NY 357 continued south to the Letchworth State Park boundary and north to NY 39 in the village of Castile.) once proposed to extend into the village of Castile
CR 56			CR 29	East Koy Road in Genesee Falls	NY 19A	Proposed number
CR 57	4.30	6.92	NY 78	Poplar Tree and Mote roads in Wethersfield	CR 4	
CR 58	0.18	0.29	School Street	Main Street in Eagle	NY 362	
CR 59	1.00	1.61	Cattaraugus County line (becomes CR 90)	Bixby Hill Road in Arcade	NY 39 Main Street	
CR 60	2.64	4.25	CR 7 in Middlebury	Wyoming Road	NY 19 in Covington	
CR 62	4.54	7.31	US 20A in Sheldon	French Road	NY 354 in Bennington	

== See also ==
- County routes in New York
- List of former state routes in New York (301–400)
