= New York State Route 39 =

State highway in western New York, US

New York State Route 39
- Map of western New York with NY 39 highlighted in red

Route information
- Maintained by NYSDOT and the village of Geneseo
- Length: 98.89 mi (159.15 km)
- Existed: 1930–present

Major junctions
- West end: US 20 in Sheridan
- US 62 in Gowanda and Collins; US 219 in Springville; US 20A in Leicester and Geneseo
- East end: US 20 / NY 5 in Avon

Location
- Country: United States
- State: New York
- Counties: Chautauqua, Cattaraugus, Erie, Wyoming, Livingston

Highway system
- New York Highways; Interstate; US; State; Reference; Parkways
← NY 39	→ NY 40
← NY 20C	NY 20D	→ NY 20N

New York State Route 39 (NY 39) is an east–west state highway in the western portion of New York in the United States. It begins and ends at intersections with U.S. Route 20 (US 20) 98.89 miles (159.15 km) apart. The western terminus of NY 39 is east of Fredonia in the Chautauqua County town of Sheridan, while the eastern terminus is in the Livingston County village of Avon. At its east end, NY 39 also ends at NY 5, which is concurrent to US 20 at this point. NY 39 serves several villages, including Gowanda and Geneseo, and intersects a handful of major north–south highways, such as US 219 in Springville and NY 19 near Pike. Most of the route is a two-lane highway that passes through rural, undeveloped areas.

NY 39 was assigned as part of the 1930 renumbering of state highways in New York to an alignment extending from Dunkirk in the west to Geneva in the east via Pike, Dansville, and Naples. From Pike eastward, NY 39 used large parts of modern NY 436 and NY 245. At the time, what is now NY 39 northeast of Pike was part of then-NY 245 from Pike to Perry and US 20 from outside of Leicester to Avon. US 20 was realigned between Geneseo and East Avon c. 1931 to follow a more easterly alignment via Lakeville, at which time the Geneseo–Avon highway became New York State Route 20D. Over the next decade, the Pike–Perry–Avon highway underwent several designation changes, culminating with the realignment of NY 39 onto it c. 1940. The route was cut back to its current western terminus in the mid-1960s.

== Route description ==
All but 0.46 miles (0.74 km) of NY 39 is maintained by the New York State Department of Transportation (NYSDOT). The lone non-state-maintained segment lies within the village of Geneseo, where the route is maintained by the village from the east end of the overlap with US 20A to North Street, a local east–west street four blocks to the north of US 20A.

=== Sheridan to Gowanda ===
NY 39 begins at an intersection with US 20 at the southern extent of the town of Sheridan, located northeast of the village of Fredonia and southeast of the city of Dunkirk. Heading east, NY 39 passes farmland and other undeveloped areas as it intersects a number of Chautauqua County routes. The most notable of these is County Route 85 (CR 85), which was once NY 428 north of where it meets NY 39 in the hamlet of Forestville. Although NY 39 crosses many county routes as it makes its way across the towns of Sheridan and Hanover, it does not intersect another state-maintained route until it crosses into Cattaraugus County. Across the county line, NY 39 enters the hamlet of Perrysburg, centered around the route's junction with CR 58, locally known as North Road. South of this point, CR 58 was once part of NY 353.

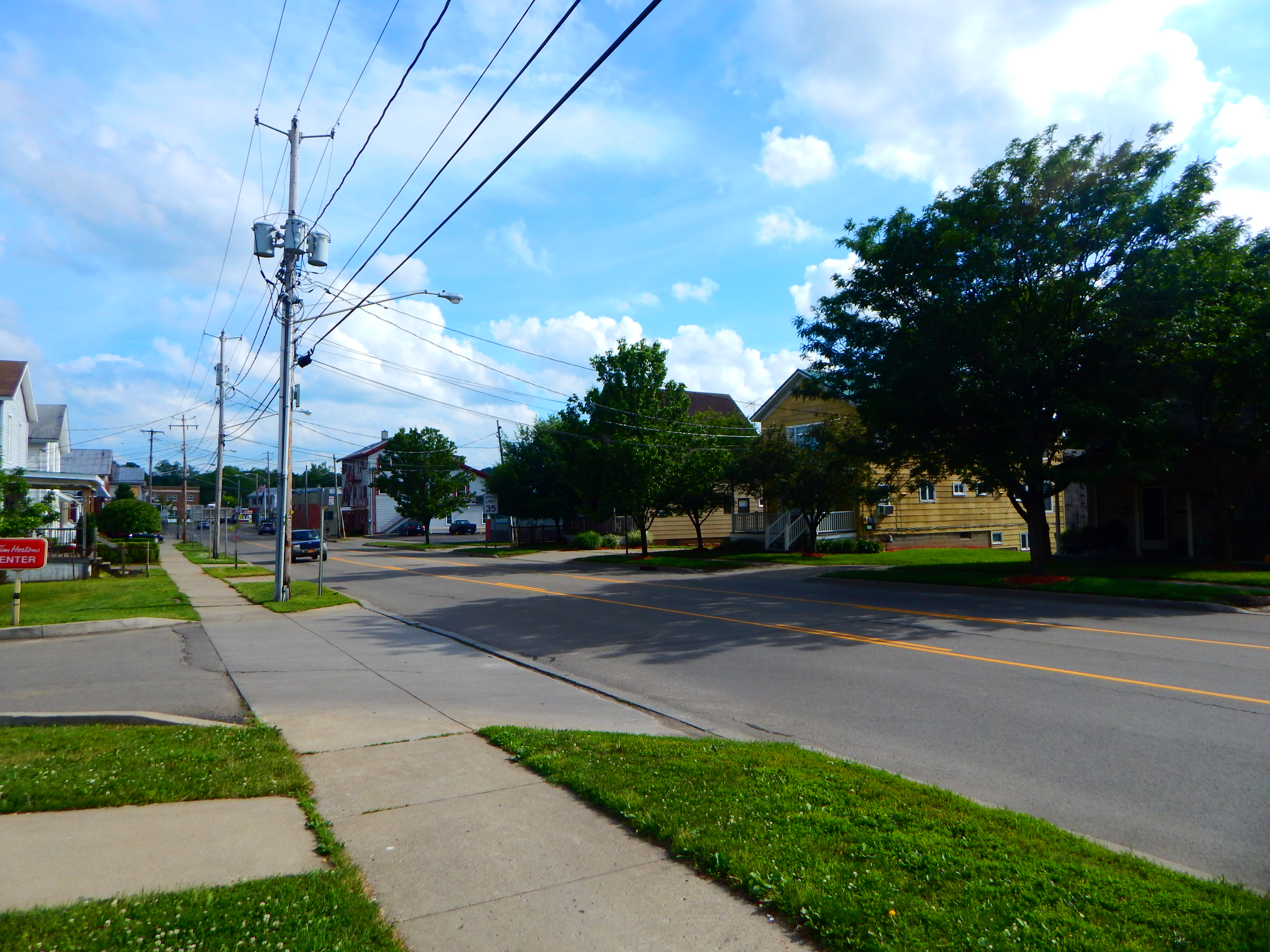
US 62 and NY 39 through Gowanda

To the east, NY 39 briefly turns northward before following West Main Street eastward into the creekside village of Gowanda. It continues east to the village's business district, located adjacent to Cattaraugus Creek, where the route intersects US 62. The two routes form a northward concurrency, jointly occupying West Main Street to the bridge traversing Cattaraugus Creek a mere 60 yards (55 m) to the northeast, where the road name becomes East Main Street and the county becomes Erie County on the other side of the waterway. US 62 and NY 39 break from East Main Street 90 yards (82 m) later, following Buffalo Street northward through a mostly residential neighborhood. At the northern edge of the village, the two routes change direction again, turning east onto Sandhill Road. Buffalo Street continues to be a touring route, however, as NY 438 continues north on Buffalo Street toward the Cattaraugus Indian Reservation.

=== Erie County and vicinity ===
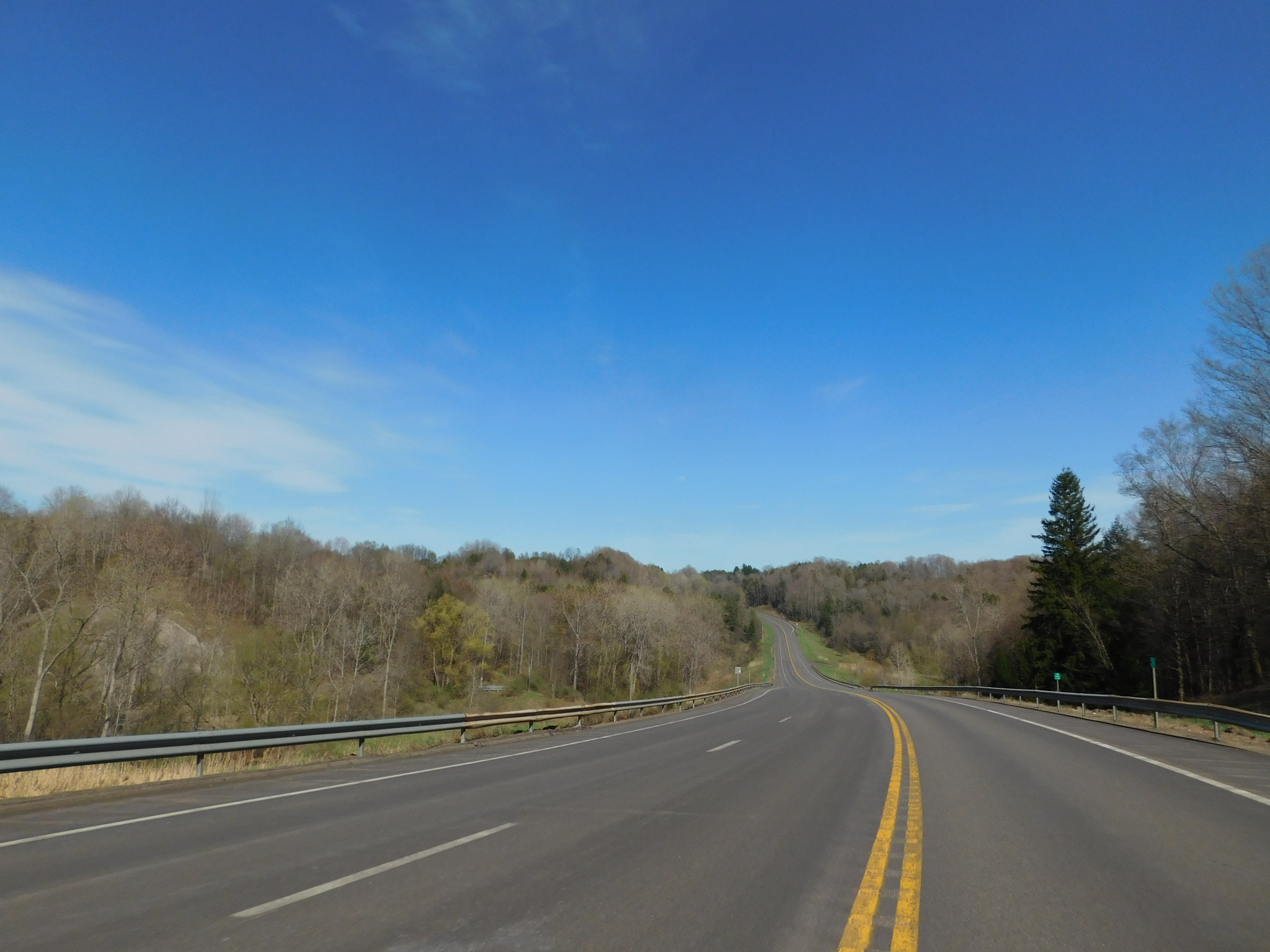
NY 39 west of Springville

Outside of Gowanda, US 62 and NY 39 take on a more northerly routing to the town of Collins, where the two routes split in the town center. US 62 continues northward towards Buffalo on Gowanda–Buffalo Road while NY 39 takes Main Street east out of town. In Collins Center to the east, NY 39 intersects the southern terminus of the Sisson Highway, NY 75. Past the hamlet, NY 39 heads generally northeastward across 8 miles (13 km) of open areas to the village of Springville. West of the village, NY 39 meets the Southern Expressway (US 219) at an interchange. Not far to the east is a junction with the heavily commercialized Cascade Drive, the newer of US 219's two former routings through Springville.

NY 39 continues east past Cascade Drive and into the village, where it becomes Main Street. In the village's central business district, NY 39 crosses Buffalo Street, US 219's original alignment through Springville. The route continues on, meeting NY 240 at the eastern village line before proceeding into another rural area dominated by farmlands. From Springville to Yorkshire, NY 39 closely parallels the northern bank of Cattaraugus Creek as it heads to the northeast. The route crosses the creek 9 miles (14 km) later in the town of Sardinia, where it intersects NY 16 east of the town center. NY 16 and NY 39 come together for a brief overlap that leads NY 39 south across the creek and back into Cattaraugus County. They split just south of the creek in the town of Yorkshire, at which point NY 39 heads east for 0.8 miles (1.3 km) to enter Wyoming County.

=== Wyoming County ===
In the neighboring village of Arcade, NY 39 remains Main Street, acting as the primary east–west road through town. It crosses two railroad lines, the Buffalo Line that is owned by the Norfolk Southern Railway and operated by the Buffalo and Pittsburgh Railroad and the Arcade and Attica Railroad (ARA), by way of two grade crossings immediately after entering the village. The route continues on through the lightly developed western half of Arcade, crossing the ARA a second time before both reach the more populated village center. Here, the railroad crosses NY 39 a third and final time before connecting to NY 98 at Liberty Street. That route overlaps with NY 39 for a mere 300 yards (270 m) east to Water Street, where NY 98 resumes its northward trek toward Batavia. After another 0.5 miles (0.8 km), Arcade abruptly ends, giving way to more fields of farmland, a common sight along NY 39 from here eastward.

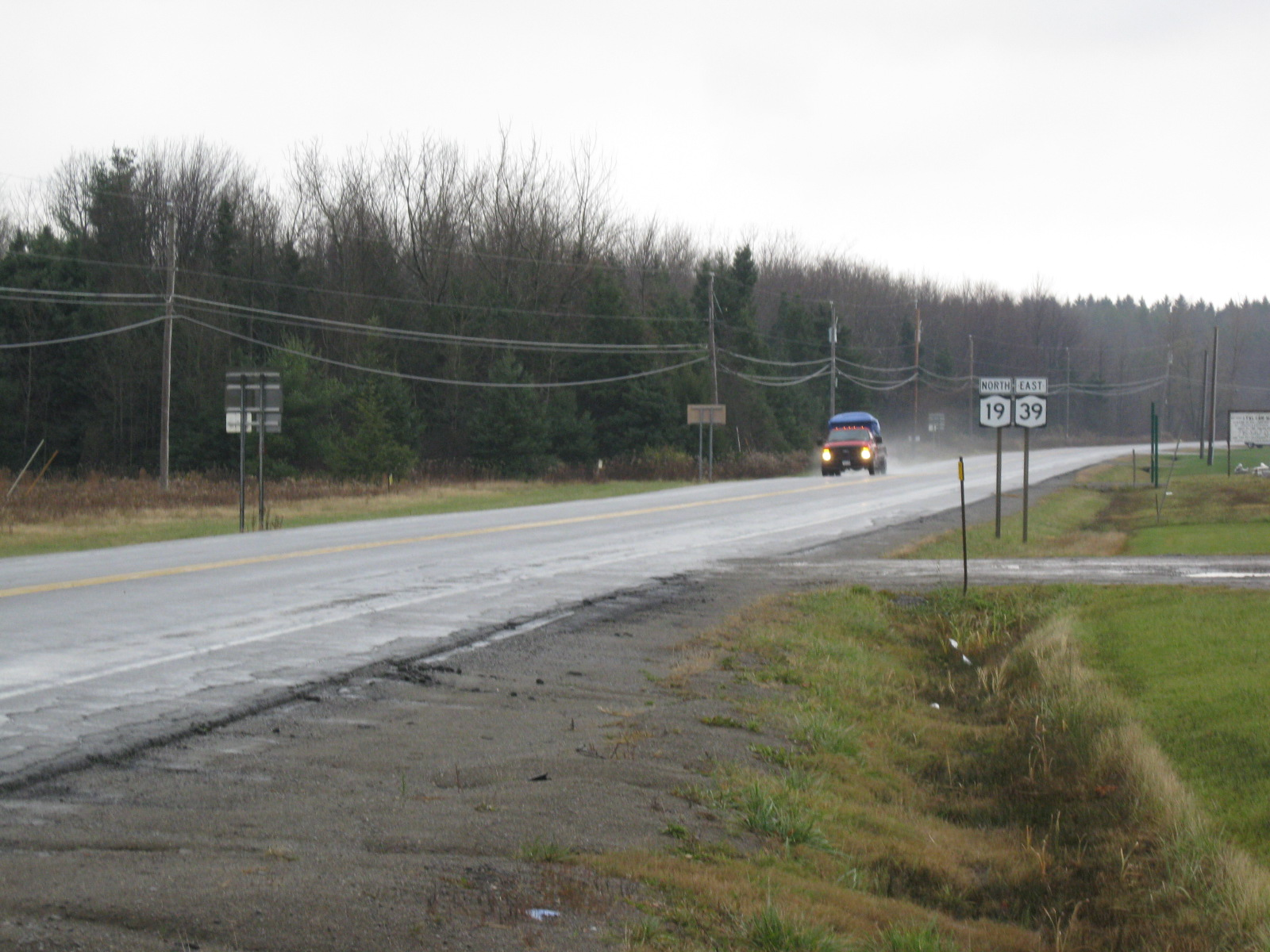
NY 19 north and NY 39 east in Pike

About 9 miles (14 km) northeast of Arcade in the hamlet of Bliss, NY 39 intersects the southern terminus of NY 362, a short north-south connector linking NY 39 to NY 78. After another 5 miles (8 km), NY 39 connects to the north–south NY 19 outside of the hamlet of Pike. At this point, NY 39 turns to the northeast, a direction that it proceeds in for most of the remainder of its routing. The first 1 mile (1.6 km) of this stretch overlaps with NY 19, which eventually splits from NY 39 to proceed north to Lake Ontario. NY 39 continues on, connecting to the western terminus of NY 436 in the hamlet of Lamont before intersecting NY 19A southwest of the village of Castile.

NY 19A, an easterly alternate route of NY 19, merges with NY 39, following the latter for 0.25 miles (0.40 km) to an unorthodox intersection southwest of the village. Heading west on NY 39, traffic is diverted onto a ramp leading to NY 19A, where commuters must turn left onto NY 19A to continue west on NY 39. Eastbound NY 39, however, has no such configuration, allowing eastbound traffic to remain on NY 39 through the intersection. Between Castile and the village of Perry, NY 39 assumes a slightly more northerly alignment, paralleling the edges of Silver Lake a half-mile to the northwest and Letchworth State Park 2 miles (3.2 km) to the southeast. Upon entering Perry, NY 39 shifts to a northeasterly alignment once again as it intersects NY 246 in the village center. East of the village, NY 39 switches counties for the final time as the road crosses into Livingston County.

=== Livingston County ===
Northeast of where NY 39 enters the county but southwest of the village of Leicester, NY 39 intersects US 20A in an area known as Pine Tavern. The two routes fuse together and head northeast to Leicester, where they descend into a valley surrounding the Genesee River and form a short concurrency with NY 36 in the village center. NY 36 enters from the north and travels east along US 20A and NY 39 for 250 yards (230 m) prior to continuing south to Pennsylvania, leaving US 20A and NY 39 to continue east. They serve Cuylerville, a small hamlet on the outskirts of Leicester, before crossing over the Genesee River and climbing the eastern face of the valley to reach a junction with NY 63. Like NY 19A near Castile, NY 63 overlaps US 20A/NY 39 for just 0.25 miles (0.40 km) before it forks from the route at the southernmost point of the SUNY Geneseo campus.

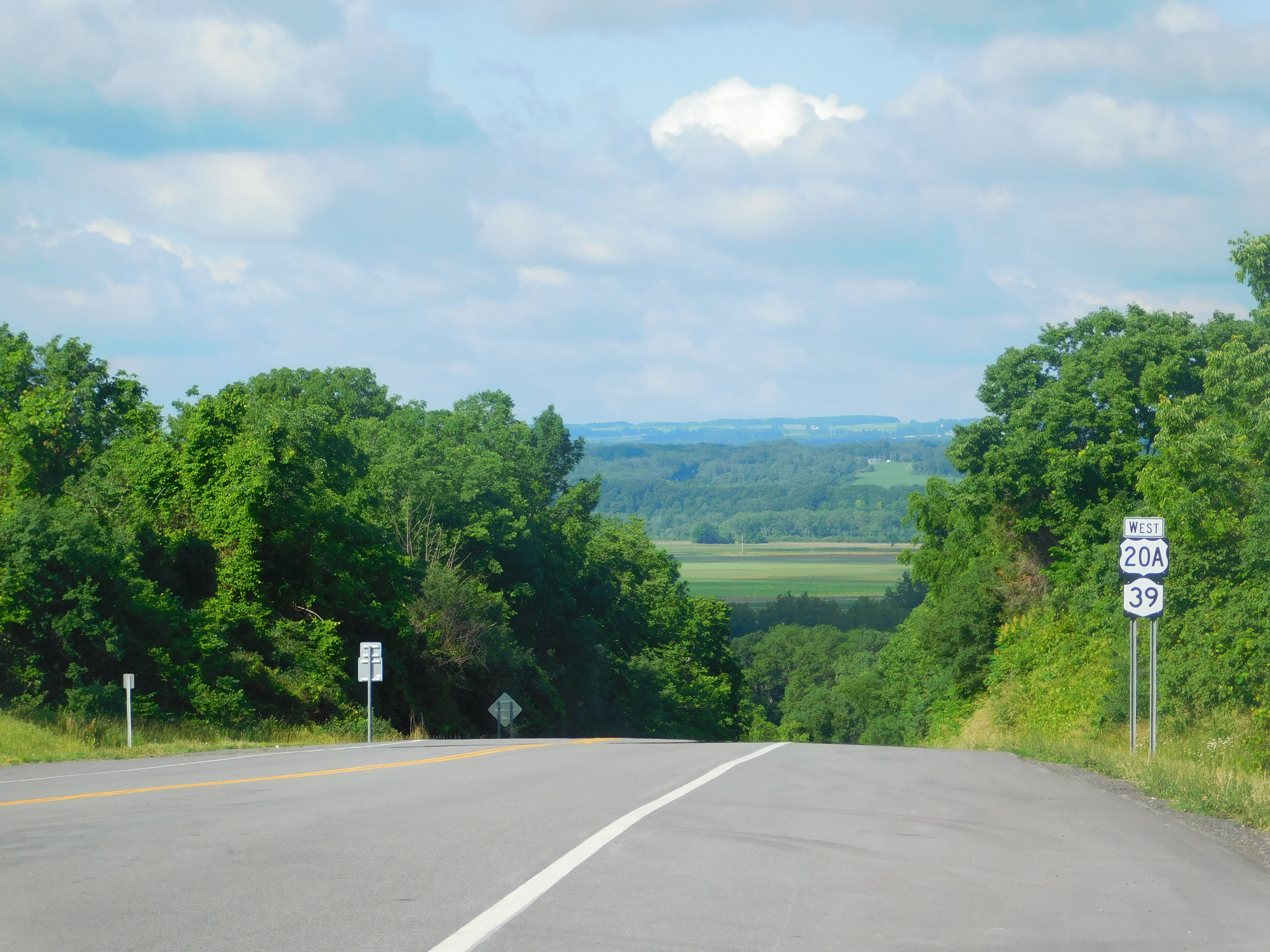
US 20A and NY 39 in the town of Geneseo

While NY 63 runs along the western edge of the college, US 20A and NY 39 follow the eastern edge of SUNY Geneseo northward to the village center. Here, the two routes meet Mary Jemison Drive, an east–west street that serves that the only connection between NY 39 west and NY 63 north. At the same intersection, US 20A and NY 39 turn east onto South Street; however, the concurrency terminates just one block later at Main Street. Here, NY 39 turns north, leaving US 20A to proceed east toward the Finger Lakes.

Outside of Geneseo, NY 39 becomes Avon Road, a name it retains to the outskirts of the village of Avon. As it enters Avon, the farmlands give way to more developed, mostly residential areas. Now named Wadsworth Avenue, NY 39 passes west of a large Kraft Foods plant that occupies a large portion of southwestern Avon. North of the plant, the route heads past residential neighborhoods to the west and commercial establishments situated on the Livonia, Avon and Lakeville Railroad (LAL) to the east. NY 39 ends about 0.5 miles (0.8 km) from the plant at a junction with US 20 and NY 5 west of the center of Avon and just west of where those two routes cross the LAL at-grade.

== History ==
The modern routing of NY 39 between Geneseo and Avon was originally designated as part of NY 36 in the mid-1920s. Around the same time, the piece between Pine Tavern and Geneseo became part of NY 35. In 1927, the portion of NY 35 between East Aurora and Geneseo and the segment of NY 36 from Geneseo to Avon were incorporated into US 20, a new cross-state U.S. Highway that continued east from Avon toward Albany and west from Pine Tavern toward Buffalo. As a result, NY 36 was truncated to its junction with US 20 in Leicester. In Avon, US 20 was routed on Wadsworth Avenue, Spring Street, and Genesee Street.

NY 39 was assigned as part of the 1930 renumbering of state highways in New York and originally extended from NY 20A (now NY 5) in Dunkirk to US 20 and NY 5 west of the city of Geneva. In between, NY 39 passed through the villages of Pike, Dansville, Naples, and Rushville. The portion of the route from Dansville to Geneva had previously been designated as NY 52. At the same time, a highway connecting Pike to Perry Center via Castile and Perry village was designated as NY 245. US 20 was realigned between Geneseo and East Avon c. 1931 to use NY 254 (current US 20A) and NY 2 (now NY 15) instead. The former routing of US 20 between Geneseo and Avon was redesignated as NY 20D. NY 245 was realigned north of Perry to follow a new highway (modern NY 39) to an intersection with US 20 southwest of Leicester c. 1934.

US 20 was realigned c. 1938 to follow its modern routing between Hamburg and Avon. Its former alignment between Hamburg and Geneseo became part of NY 20A, which continued north from Geneseo to Avon over NY 20D. By the following year, the Hamburg–Geneseo segment of NY 20A was included in the new US 20A while the Geneseo–Avon portion became part of a realigned NY 254. The routings of NY 39 and NY 245 east of Pike were swapped in the fall of 1939, placing NY 245 on a routing extending from Pike to Geneva and NY 39 on its modern alignment to Leicester. NY 39 was also extended northeast to Avon as part of the change, supplanting NY 254. The portion of NY 39 within Avon was rerouted to follow Wadsworth Avenue to West Main Street (US 20 and NY 5) in the early 1950s.

In Dunkirk, NY 39 originally began at the intersection of East Lake Shore Drive (NY 5) and Main Street. From there, it followed Main Street, Franklin Avenue, and Roberts Road to US 20. NY 39 was truncated to its current western terminus east of the city in the mid-1960s; however, the portion of its former routing outside of the Dunkirk city limits remained state maintained as an unsigned reference route, NY 837. On April 1, 1980, ownership and maintenance of it was transferred from the state of New York to Chautauqua County as part of a highway maintenance swap between the two levels of government. The Roberts Road segment of NY 39's former alignment is now part of CR 81 while the Main Street portion is now the northernmost part of NY 60.

== Major intersections ==
County	Location	mi	km	Destinations	Notes
Chautauqua	Sheridan	0.00	0.00	US 20 to I-90 – Fredonia, Silver Creek	Western terminus
Cattaraugus	Gowanda	17.89	28.79	US 62 south	Southern terminus of US 62 / NY 39 overlap
Erie	Gowanda	18.62	29.97	NY 438 west – Silver Creek	Eastern terminus of NY 438
Erie	Town of Collins	20.46	32.93	US 62 north – Buffalo	Northern terminus of US 62 / NY 39 overlap; hamlet of Collins
Erie	Town of Collins	24.45	39.35	NY 75 north – Hamburg	Southern terminus of NY 75; hamlet of Collins Center
Erie	Springville	33.17	53.38	US 219 – Ellicottville, Salamanca, Hamburg, Buffalo	Interchange
Erie	Springville	35.80	57.61	NY 240 – Glenwood, Orchard Park, Ellicottville	
Erie	Sardinia	45.06	72.52	NY 16 north – East Aurora	Northern terminus of NY 16 / NY 39 overlap
Cattaraugus	Yorkshire	45.86	73.80	NY 16 south – Olean	Southern terminus of NY 16 / NY 39 overlap; hamlet of Yorkshire
Wyoming	Village of Arcade	48.73	78.42	NY 98 south	Western terminus of NY 39 / NY 98 overlap
Wyoming	Village of Arcade	48.86	78.63	NY 98 north – Attica	Eastern terminus of NY 39 / NY 98 overlap
Wyoming	Eagle	58.42	94.02	NY 362 north – Bliss	Hamlet of Bliss; southern terminus of NY 362
Wyoming	Town of Pike	64.64	104.03	NY 19 south – Pike	Southern terminus of NY 19 / NY 39 overlap; hamlet of Pike
Wyoming	Town of Pike	65.25	105.01	NY 19 north – Gainesville	Northern terminus of NY 19 / NY 39 overlap
Wyoming	Town of Pike	67.37	108.42	NY 436 east – State Park	Hamlet of Lamont; western terminus of NY 436
Wyoming	Town of Castile	70.10	112.82	NY 19A south – Letchworth State Park	Southern terminus of NY 19A / NY 39 overlap
Wyoming	Village of Castile	70.30	113.14	NY 19A north – Silver Springs, Warsaw	Northern terminus of NY 19A / NY 39 overlap
Wyoming	Village of Perry	77.49	124.71	NY 246 north	Southern terminus of NY 246
Livingston	Town of Leicester	82.46	132.71	US 20A west – Warsaw	Western terminus of US 20A / NY 39 overlap
Livingston	Village of Leicester	84.75	136.39	NY 36 north – Caledonia, Buffalo area	Western terminus of NY 36 / NY 39 overlap
Livingston	Village of Leicester	84.89	136.62	NY 36 south to I-390 – Mount Morris, Letchworth State Park	Eastern terminus of NY 36 / NY 39 overlap
Livingston	Town of Geneseo	88.63	142.64	NY 63 south – Mount Morris, Dansville	Southern terminus of NY 39 / NY 63 overlap
Livingston	Town of Geneseo	88.94	143.14	NY 63 north – Batavia	Northern terminus of NY 39 / NY 63 overlap
Livingston	Village of Geneseo	89.54	144.10	NY 942D north (Mary Jemison Drive) to NY 63	Eastern terminus of unsigned NY 942D; to NY 63 north only signed westbound
Livingston	Village of Geneseo	89.64	144.26	US 20A east – Lakeville	Eastern terminus of US 20A / NY 39 overlap
Livingston	Village of Avon	98.89	159.15	US 20 / NY 5 to I-390 – Canandaigua	Eastern terminus
1.000 mi = 1.609 km; 1.000 km = 0.621 mi: Concurrency terminus
