= Gainesville (village), New York =

Gainesville, New York
- Village
- Location within the state of New York
- Coordinates: 42°39′51″N 78°6′58″W
- Country: United States
- State: New York
- County: Wyoming
- Settled: 1805
- Incorporated: 1902
- Named after: Edmund P. Gaines

Area
  - Total: 0.86 sq mi (2.22 km^{2})
  - Land: 0.86 sq mi (2.22 km^{2})
  - Water: 0 sq mi (0.00 km^{2})
- Elevation: 1,663 ft (507 m)

Population (2020)
  - Total: 211
  - Density: 246.5/sq mi (95.18/km^{2})
- Time zone: UTC-5 (Eastern (EST))
  - Summer (DST): UTC-4 (EDT)
- ZIP code: 14066
- Area code: 585
- FIPS code: 36-27969
- GNIS feature ID: 950842
- Website: www.wyomingco.net/towns/villageofgainesville.htm

Gainesville is a village in Wyoming County, New York, United States. The population was 304 at the 2000 census. The village is named after General Edmund P. Gaines.

The Village of Gainesville lies within the boundaries of the Town of Gainesville. The village is on NYS Route 19, south of NYS Route 78.

== History ==
The Town of Hebe was founded in Genesse County in 1814. It later was renamed to Gainesville in 1816 and transferred to Wyoming County in 1841.

== Geography ==
According to the United States Census Bureau, the village has a total area of 0.9 square mile (2.2 km^{2}), all land.

== Demographics ==
Historical population
Census	Pop.	Note	%±
1910	327		—
1920	341		4.3%
1930	270		−20.8%
1940	283		4.8%
1950	314		11.0%
1960	369		17.5%
1970	385		4.3%
1980	334		−13.2%
1990	340		1.8%
2000	304		−10.6%
2010	229		−24.7%
2020	211		−7.9%
U.S. Decennial Census

As of the census of 2000, there were 304 people, 113 households, and 87 families residing in the village. The population density was 356.8 inhabitants per square mile (137.8/km^{2}). There were 122 housing units at an average density of 55.4 persons/km^{2} (143.2 persons/sq mi). The racial makeup of the village was 99.67% White, 0.00% African American, 0.00% Native American, 0.33% Asian, 0.00% Pacific Islander, 0.00% from other races. 0.66% of the population were Hispanic or Latino of any race.

There were 113 households, out of which 44.2% had children under the age of 18 living with them, 53.1% were married couples living together, 15.9% have a woman whose husband does not live with her, and 23.0% were non-families. 16.8% of all households were made up of individuals, and 4.4% had someone living alone who was 65 years of age or older. The average household size was 2.69 and the average family size was 2.98.

In the village, the population was spread out, with 30.6% under the age of 18, 6.9% from 18 to 24, 30.6% from 25 to 44, 21.4% from 45 to 64, and 10.5% who were 65 years of age or older. The median age was 36 years. For every 100 females, there were 104.0 males. For every 100 females age 18 and over, there were 91.8 males.

The median income for a household in the village was $31,875, and the median income for a family was $30,500. Males had a median income of $33,571 versus $18,000 for females. The per capita income for the village was $14,385. 7.4% of the population and 6.1% of families were below the poverty line. Out of the total people living in poverty, 6.7% are under the age of 18 and 0.0% are 65 or older.

== Notable people ==
- Gordon F. Allen, former professor and administrator at the State University of New York at Brockport
- John W. Brownson, former Wisconsin State Assemblyman
- Lovisa Card-Catlin, developed Erie, Pennsylvania’s art community
- David Starr Jordan, leading ichthyologist, educator and peace activist. President of Indiana University and Stanford University.
- John Victor Skiff, environmental conservationist and public servant
