= New York State Route 362 =

State highway in Wyoming County, New York, US

New York State Route 362
- Map of Wyoming County in western New York with NY 362 highlighted in red

Route information
- Maintained by NYSDOT
- Length: 3.68 mi (5.92 km)
- Existed: 1930–present

Major junctions
- South end: NY 39 in Eagle
- North end: NY 78 in Wethersfield

Location
- Country: United States
- State: New York
- Counties: Wyoming

Highway system
- New York Highways; Interstate; US; State; Reference; Parkways
← NY 361	→ NY 363

New York State Route 362 (NY 362) is a state highway located entirely in Wyoming County, New York, in the United States. It runs north–south for 3.68 miles (5.92 km) between an intersection with NY 39 in the town of Eagle and a junction with NY 78 in the town of Wethersfield. The two-lane route begins in the hamlet of Bliss, and heads across gradually less developed areas as it heads north from the community. NY 362 was assigned to its current routing as part of the 1930 renumbering of state highways in New York.

== Route description ==
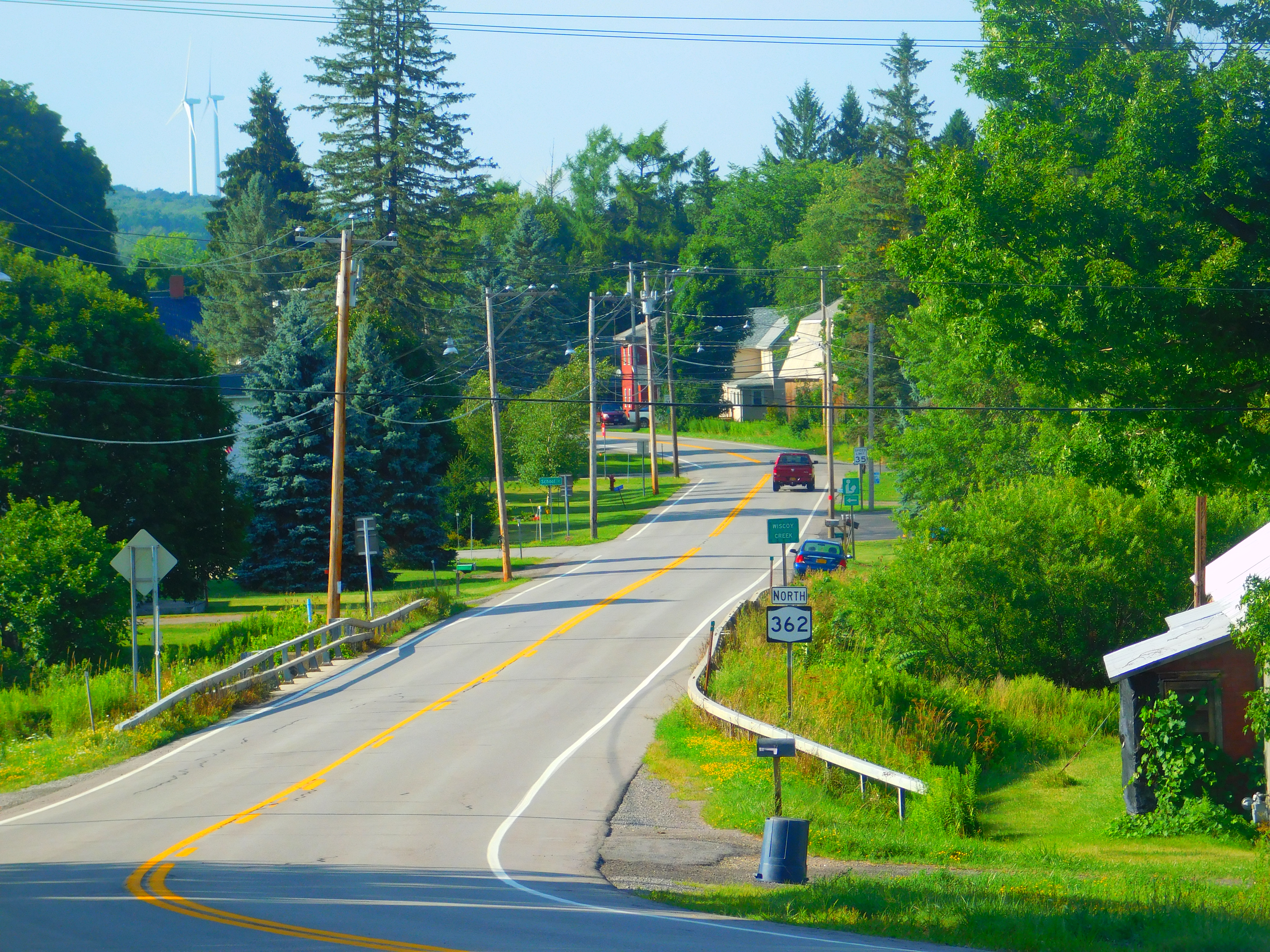
NY 362 through the hamlet of Bliss, as seen from old NY 39

NY 362 begins at an intersection with NY 39 in the hamlet of Bliss, located within the town of Eagle. The route heads north through the community as a two-lane road, traversing several residential blocks ahead of a junction with Main Street (County Route 58). Past this junction, NY 362 turns northwest and heads under an abandoned railroad overpass as it leaves Bliss for less developed areas of the town of Eagle. Outside of Bliss, the highway gradually turns to the north, serving a handful of scattered residences located in otherwise open and rolling terrain in the northern part of the town. NY 362 eventually crosses into the town of Wethersfield, where the homes gradually give way to large cultivated fields ahead of the route's end at a rural junction with NY 78.

== History ==
On April 27, 1911, the state of New York awarded a contract to rebuild all of what is now NY 362. The project cost $44,785 to complete (equivalent to $1.46 million in 2024), and the reconstructed road was added to the state highway system on January 24, 1912, as unsigned State Highway 893 (SH 893). In the 1930 renumbering of state highways in New York, hundreds of state-maintained highways were given posted route numbers for the first time. One of these was SH 893, which was designated NY 362. The alignment of the route has not been changed since that time.

== Major intersections ==
The entire route is in Wyoming County.

Location	mi	km	Destinations	Notes
Eagle	0.00	0.00	NY 39 – Pike, Arcade	Southern terminus; hamlet of Bliss
Wethersfield	3.68	5.92	NY 78 – Java Center, Warsaw	Northern terminus
1.000 mi = 1.609 km; 1.000 km = 0.621 mi
