= Bliss, New York =

- Census-designated place
- Location within New York Location within the United States
- Coordinates: 42°34′48″N 78°15′13″W
- Country: United States
- State: New York
- County: Wyoming
- Town: Eagle

Area
  - Total: 9.79 sq mi (25.36 km^{2})
  - Land: 9.79 sq mi (25.36 km^{2})
  - Water: 0 sq mi (0.00 km^{2})
- Elevation: 1,715 ft (523 m)

Population (2020)
  - Total: 496
  - Density: 50.7/sq mi (19.56/km^{2})
- Time zone: UTC-5 (Eastern (EST))
  - Summer (DST): UTC-4 (EDT)
- ZIP Code: 14024
- Area code: 585
- FIPS code: 36-06904
- GNIS feature ID: 2627975

Bliss is the largest hamlet and a census-designated place (CDP) in the town of Eagle, Wyoming County, New York, United States. As of the 2020 census, Bliss had a population of 496.

The community is in southern Wyoming County, in the north and central part of the town of Eagle. It is bordered to the north by the town of Wethersfield. Bliss is in the valley of Wiscoy Creek where it is joined by its North Branch. Wiscoy Creek flows east and south to the Genesee River, a tributary of Lake Ontario.

New York State Route 39 passes through the south side of Bliss, following the Wiscoy Creek valley. The highway leads east 6 miles (10 km) to Pike and west 10 miles (16 km) to Arcade. State Route 362 runs through the center of Bliss, starting at Route 39 on the south side and leading north 4 miles (6 km) to Route 78 in Wethersfield.

== Demographics ==
Historical population
Census	Pop.	Note	%±
2020	496		—
U.S. Decennial Census

== Education ==
Most of the CDP is in the Letchworth Central School District. A southwest portion is in the Yorkshire-Pioneer Central School District.
