= Wyoming County, New York =

County in New York, United States

- County
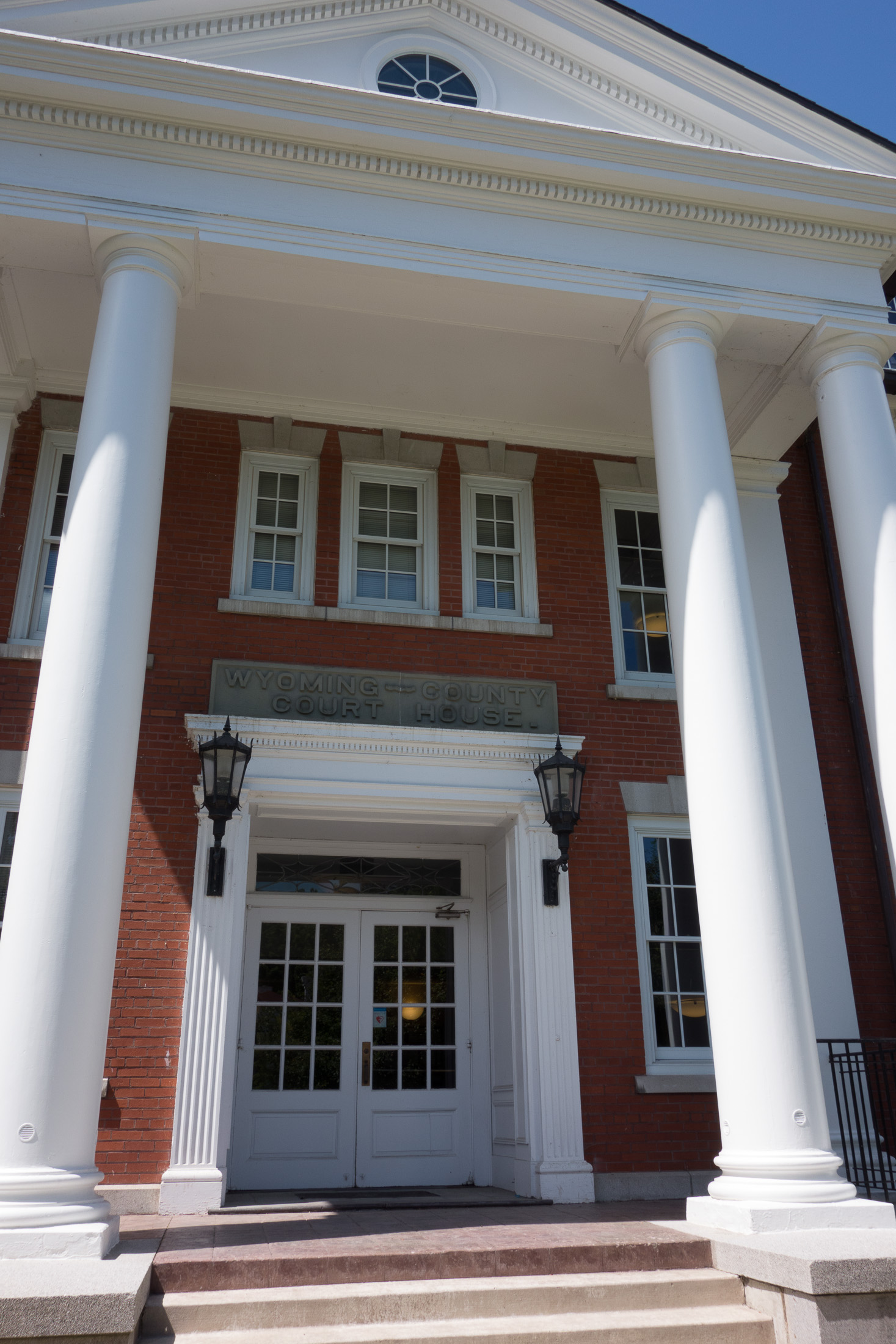
- Old Wyoming County Courthouse

- Flag Seal

- Location within the U.S. state of New York
- Coordinates: 42°50′N 78°05′W
- Country: United States
- State: New York
- Founded: 1841
- Seat: Warsaw
- Largest village: Warsaw

Area
  - Total: 596 sq mi (1,540 km^{2})
  - Land: 593 sq mi (1,540 km^{2})
  - Water: 3.5 sq mi (9.1 km^{2}) 0.6%

Population (2020)
  - Total: 40,531
  - Estimate (2025): 39,741 ▼
  - Density: 68.4/sq mi (26.4/km^{2})
- Time zone: UTC−5 (Eastern)
  - Summer (DST): UTC−4 (EDT)
- Congressional district: 24th
- Website: www.wyomingco.net

Wyoming County is a county in the U.S. state of New York, located in the state's western area. As of the 2020 census, the population was 40,531. The county seat is Warsaw. The name is modified from a Lenape (Delaware) Native American word meaning "broad bottom lands". Wyoming County was formed from Genesee County in 1841. Wyoming County is one of New York's mostly agricultural counties. With an estimated 47,500 dairy cows in the county, there are more cattle in Wyoming County than people. The county is part of the Finger Lakes region of the state.

== History ==
As with the rest of Western New York, Wyoming County was part of disputed territory throughout the 17th and 18th centuries, claimed by the Massachusetts Bay Colony, Connecticut Colony, Province of Pennsylvania, New York Colony, and New France. New York's claims were not recognized until the Treaty of Hartford was ratified in 1786 and were not actively asserted until the Holland Purchase.

In regard to New York's claim, as of 1683 the present Wyoming County was part of Albany County of the Province of New York. This was an enormous county, including the northern part of New York State as well as all of the present State of Vermont and, in theory, extending westward to the Pacific Ocean. This county was reduced in size on July 3, 1766, by the creation of Cumberland County, and further on March 16, 1770, by the creation of Gloucester County, both containing territory now in the state of Vermont.

On March 12, 1772, what was left of Albany County was split into three parts, one remaining under the name Albany County. One of the other pieces, Tryon County, contained the western portion (and thus, since no western boundary was specified, theoretically still extended west to the Pacific). The eastern boundary of Tryon County was approximately five miles west of the present city of Schenectady, and the county included the western part of the Adirondack Mountains and the area west of the West Branch of the Delaware River. The area then designated as Tryon County now includes 37 counties of New York State.

In the years prior to 1776, most of the Loyalists in Tryon County fled to Canada. In 1784, following the peace treaty that ended the American Revolutionary War, the name of Tryon County was changed to Montgomery County in order to honor the general, Richard Montgomery, who had captured several places in Canada and died attempting to capture the city of Quebec, replacing the name of the hated British governor.

In 1789, Ontario County was split off from Montgomery as part of the establishment of the Morris Reserve.

Almost all of the land west of the Genesee River, including all of present-day Wyoming County, was part of the Holland Land Purchase in 1793. It was sold privately to settlers through the Holland Land Company's office in Batavia, starting in 1801.

Genesee County was created by a splitting of Ontario County in 1802 to govern the land acquired in the Holland Purchase. This territory was much larger than the present Genesee County. It was reduced in size in 1806 by creating Allegany County; again in 1808 by creating Cattaraugus, Chautauqua, and Niagara counties. Niagara County at that time also included the present Erie County.

In 1821, portions of Genesee County were combined with portions of Ontario County to create Livingston and Monroe counties.

Genesee County was further reduced in size in 1824 by creating Orleans County.

Finally, in 1841, Wyoming County was created from the southern half of Genesee County, the northwest corner of Allegany County, and a small portion of the northeast corner of Cattaraugus County.

== Geography ==
According to the U.S. Census Bureau, the county has a total area of 596 square miles (1,540 km^{2}), of which 593 square miles (1,540 km^{2}) is land and 3.5 square miles (9.1 km^{2}) (0.6%) is water.

Wyoming County is in the western part of New York State, east of Buffalo and slightly west of due south of Rochester. The county is in the Holland Purchase Region.

The county is largely rural, dotted with small towns. Even the county seat, Warsaw is quite small. The land surface is generally broken and hilly, and the soil fertile. Much of the area is wooded, used for timber. Some that are predominantly maple are tapped each spring for the production of maple syrup. Agriculture dominates the county economy. Apple orchards were once a major agricultural endeavor, but only a few are left. The area is also well known for outdoor sports, being an excellent area for fishing, hunting, and snowmobiling.

An active geologic fault runs down the Dale valley through Linden, to the east of Batavia and into Lake Ontario. Movement of the fault is an occasional source of minor earthquakes, which, at most, have toppled a couple chimneys. The Dale Valley has been developed as a source of salt by way of brine wells, for the chemical industry. A pipeline moves the brine to Niagara Falls.

The county is bounded on the southeast by the Genesee River, and drained by tributaries of that stream, as well as Tonawanda, Buffalo, and other creeks. An important tributary of the Genesee River, Oatka Creek, has its source in the Town of Gainesville within the county.

=== Adjacent counties ===
- Genesee County - north
- Livingston County - east
- Allegany County - south
- Cattaraugus County - southwest
- Erie County - west

=== Major highways ===
- U.S. Route 20A
- New York State Route 19
- New York State Route 19A
- New York State Route 39
- New York State Route 63
- New York State Route 77
- New York State Route 78
- New York State Route 98
- New York State Route 238
- New York State Route 246
- New York State Route 354
- New York State Route 362
- New York State Route 436

== Demographics ==
Historical population
Census	Pop.	Note	%±
1850	31,981		—
1860	31,968		0.0%
1870	29,164		−8.8%
1880	30,907		6.0%
1890	31,193		0.9%
1900	30,413		−2.5%
1910	31,880		4.8%
1920	30,314		−4.9%
1930	28,764		−5.1%
1940	31,394		9.1%
1950	32,822		4.5%
1960	34,793		6.0%
1970	37,688		8.3%
1980	39,895		5.9%
1990	42,507		6.5%
2000	43,424		2.2%
2010	42,155		−2.9%
2020	40,531		−3.9%
2025 (est.)	39,741	▼	−1.9%
U.S. Decennial Census; 1790-1960 1900-1990; 1990-2000 2010-2020

|estyear=2023 |estimate=39532

=== 2020 census ===
Wyoming County, New York – Racial and ethnic composition Note: the US Census treats Hispanic/Latino as an ethnic category. This table excludes Latinos from the racial categories and assigns them to a separate category. Hispanics/Latinos may be of any race.
Race / Ethnicity (NH = Non-Hispanic)	Pop 1980	Pop 1990	Pop 2000	Pop 2010	Pop 2020	% 1980	% 1990	% 2000	% 2010	% 2020
White alone (NH)	38,399	39,442	39,330	38,042	35,579	96.25%	92.79%	90.57%	90.24%	87.78%
Black or African American alone (NH)	1,010	1,840	2,309	2,233	1,852	2.53%	4.33%	5.32%	5.30%	4.57%
Native American or Alaska Native alone (NH)	71	87	98	103	83	0.18%	0.20%	0.23%	0.24%	0.20%
Asian alone (NH)	86	117	153	156	217	0.22%	0.28%	0.35%	0.37%	0.54%
Native Hawaiian or Pacific Islander alone (NH)	x	x	1	7	6	x	x	0.00%	0.02%	0.01%
Other race alone (NH)	36	17	18	80	77	0.09%	0.04%	0.04%	0.19%	0.19%
Mixed race or Multiracial (NH)	x	x	237	290	1,227	x	x	0.55%	0.69%	3.03%
Hispanic or Latino (any race)	293	1,004	1,278	1,244	1,490	0.73%	2.36%	2.94%	2.95%	3.68%
Total	39,895	42,507	43,424	42,155	40,531	100.00%	100.00%	100.00%	100.00%	100.00%

=== 2000 census ===
At the 2000 census, there were 43,424 people, 14,906 households and 10,717 families residing in the county. The population density was 73 per square mile (28/km^{2}). There were 16,940 housing units at an average density of 29 units per square mile (11/km^{2}). The racial makeup of the county was 91.84% White, 5.52% Black or African American, 0.27% Native American, 0.37% Asian, 0.02% Pacific Islander, 1.32% from other races, and 0.67% from two or more races. 2.94% of the population were Hispanic or Latino of any race. 31.7% were of German, 12.5% English, 10.9% Irish, 10.2% Polish, 9.3% American and 7.7% Italian ancestry according to Census 2000. 97.1% spoke English and 1.8% Spanish as their first language.

There were 14,906 households, of which 34.20% had children under the age of 18 living with them, 58.30% were married couples living together, 9.20% had a female householder with no husband present, and 28.10% were non-families. 23.20% of all households were made up of individuals, and 10.20% had someone living alone who was 65 years of age or older. The average household size was 2.62 and the average family size was 3.08.

Age distribution was 24.10% under the age of 18, 8.20% from 18 to 24, 32.80% from 25 to 44, 22.80% from 45 to 64, and 12.20% who were 65 years of age or older. The median age was 37 years. For every 100 females there were 118.30 males. For every 100 females age 18 and over, there were 122.40 males.

The median household income was $39,895, and the median family income was $45,088. Males had a median income of $31,973 versus $22,252 for females. The per capita income for the county was $17,248. About 5.80% of families and 8.40% of the population were below the poverty line, including 11.60% of those under age 18 and 5.80% of those age 65 or over.

== Government ==
Wyoming County is somewhat unusual among New York counties in that it remains governed by a 16-member Board of Supervisors, consisting of the town supervisor of each town in its territory.

=== State and federal government ===
Office	District	Area of the county	Officeholder	Party	First took office	Residence
Congressman	New York's 24th congressional district	All	Claudia Tenney	Republican	2021	New Hartford, Oneida County
State Senator	57th State Senate District	All	George Borrello	Republican	2019 (special)	Fredonia, New York
State Assemblyman	133rd State Assembly District	Perry	Marjorie Byrnes	Republican	2019	Caledonia, Livingston County
State Assemblyman	147th State Assembly District	All (except Perry)	David J. DiPietro	Republican	2013	East Aurora, Erie County

Wyoming County is part of:

- The 8th Judicial District of the New York Supreme Court
- The 4th Department of the New York Supreme Court, Appellate Division

=== Politics ===
United States presidential election results for Wyoming County, New York
Year	Republican		Democratic		Third party(ies)	
Year	No.	%	No.	%	No.	%
1884	4,441	54.38%	3,189	39.05%	536	6.56%
1888	4,899	57.04%	3,166	36.86%	524	6.10%
1892	4,430	55.61%	2,948	37.01%	588	7.38%
1896	4,967	62.28%	2,706	33.93%	302	3.79%
1900	5,032	60.31%	2,896	34.71%	415	4.97%
1904	5,456	65.76%	2,477	29.85%	364	4.39%
1908	5,308	62.32%	2,885	33.87%	324	3.80%
1912	2,838	35.79%	2,541	32.05%	2,550	32.16%
1916	4,952	62.14%	2,783	34.92%	234	2.94%
1920	9,134	75.48%	2,442	20.18%	525	4.34%
1924	10,148	74.05%	2,512	18.33%	1,045	7.62%
1928	10,830	71.48%	3,992	26.35%	330	2.18%
1932	9,377	66.33%	4,490	31.76%	270	1.91%
1936	10,253	69.09%	4,420	29.78%	168	1.13%
1940	11,323	71.87%	4,393	27.88%	39	0.25%
1944	10,219	69.57%	4,455	30.33%	15	0.10%
1948	9,871	67.78%	4,508	30.95%	185	1.27%
1952	12,154	75.05%	4,038	24.94%	2	0.01%
1956	12,499	78.63%	3,397	21.37%	0	0.00%
1960	10,793	66.19%	5,508	33.78%	6	0.04%
1964	6,099	40.71%	8,866	59.19%	15	0.10%
1968	8,459	61.45%	4,477	32.52%	829	6.02%
1972	11,184	71.75%	4,365	28.00%	39	0.25%
1976	9,726	62.59%	5,737	36.92%	76	0.49%
1980	8,108	55.72%	5,234	35.97%	1,210	8.32%
1984	11,199	71.69%	4,381	28.04%	42	0.27%
1988	9,451	63.59%	5,228	35.17%	184	1.24%
1992	7,324	44.73%	4,045	24.70%	5,006	30.57%
1996	7,477	47.26%	5,735	36.25%	2,609	16.49%
2000	10,809	61.30%	5,999	34.02%	825	4.68%
2004	11,745	64.64%	6,134	33.76%	290	1.60%
2008	10,998	62.25%	6,379	36.11%	290	1.64%
2012	10,348	63.35%	5,661	34.66%	326	2.00%
2016	12,442	71.93%	3,904	22.57%	952	5.50%
2020	13,898	71.52%	5,073	26.11%	461	2.37%
2024	14,112	73.63%	4,929	25.72%	125	0.65%

Wyoming County is extremely conservative. In state and national politics, Wyoming County is one of the most Republican counties in New York, a state that characteristically votes Democratic. In both the 2004 and 2008 U.S. presidential elections, it was the second-reddest county in New York, behind Hamilton County. In fact, the only Democrat to carry the county since the Civil War has been Lyndon Baines Johnson in 1964, during an election when no county in the Empire State supported Republican Barry Goldwater. In 2004, George W. Bush carried Wyoming County by a 30.9 percent margin over John Kerry, with Kerry carrying the state by an 18.3 percent margin. However, Senator Chuck Schumer concurrently won the county very narrowly; this was the last time that Wyoming County voted Democratic in a statewide federal election. In 2008, John McCain won the county by a 26.1 percent margin over Barack Obama, with Obama defeating McCain statewide by 26.7 percent. In New York's 2006 U.S. Senatorial election, Wyoming County voted for John Spencer by a 4% margin over Hillary Clinton, with Clinton being re-elected by a 36% margin over Spencer. In 2010, Wyoming County was one of only three counties to favor Republican Jay Townsend over Schumer. In the Senate Special election that same year, the county favored Republican Joe DioGuardi over the Democratic incumbent, Kirsten Gillibrand. In 2012, Wyoming County again selected a Republican for this seat, being one of only two counties (the other being neighboring Allegany County) to vote in favor of Republican candidate Wendy Long rather than Gillibrand. In 2016, Wyoming County once again favored Long as she lost statewide to Schumer. In 2018, the county once again rejected Gillibrand by favoring Republican Chele Farley. From 2012 onward, Wyoming has been the most Republican out of all New York's counties at the federal level; in 2024, Donald Trump won the county with over 73% of the vote, the best Republican performance since Dwight Eisenhower in 1956.

In 2017 Jon Campbell of the Democrat & Chronicle wrote that the county "is solid Trump Country."

== Points of interest ==
- Letchworth State Park, on the Genesee River forms part of the southeastern boundary of the county. A deep gorge with three major waterfalls characterize this scenic and historic area, created when a glacier during the last Ice age diverted the river and forced it to cut a new valley. It is the home area of Mary Jemison, the White Woman of the Genesee, who was captured as a young person by the Seneca tribe and became an important figure in negotiations between the tribe and the land companies.
- Middlebury Academy, in Wyoming village, the first high school level school west of the Genesee. The Greek Revival building still exists and is on the National Register of Historic Places.
- Hillside Inn, opened originally as a spa at mineral springs on the hill above Wyoming village around 1841, has entertained many important persons, including Theodore Roosevelt and his family and Susan B. Anthony,
- Arcade and Attica Railroad is a restoration of a steam locomotive.
- Attica maximum security prison is located in the northernmost part of the county.
- The Bliss Wind Farm is located in Eagle.
- Gaslight Village - downtown Wyoming is a historic village lit by gas streetlamps. Deposits of natural gas and salt have been an economic factor in the development of the area.
- Silver Lake - glacial lake
- Morton Salt - One of the largest salt mines in the Northeast is located in Silver Springs and has been running since the mid-to-late 19th century.

== Communities ==
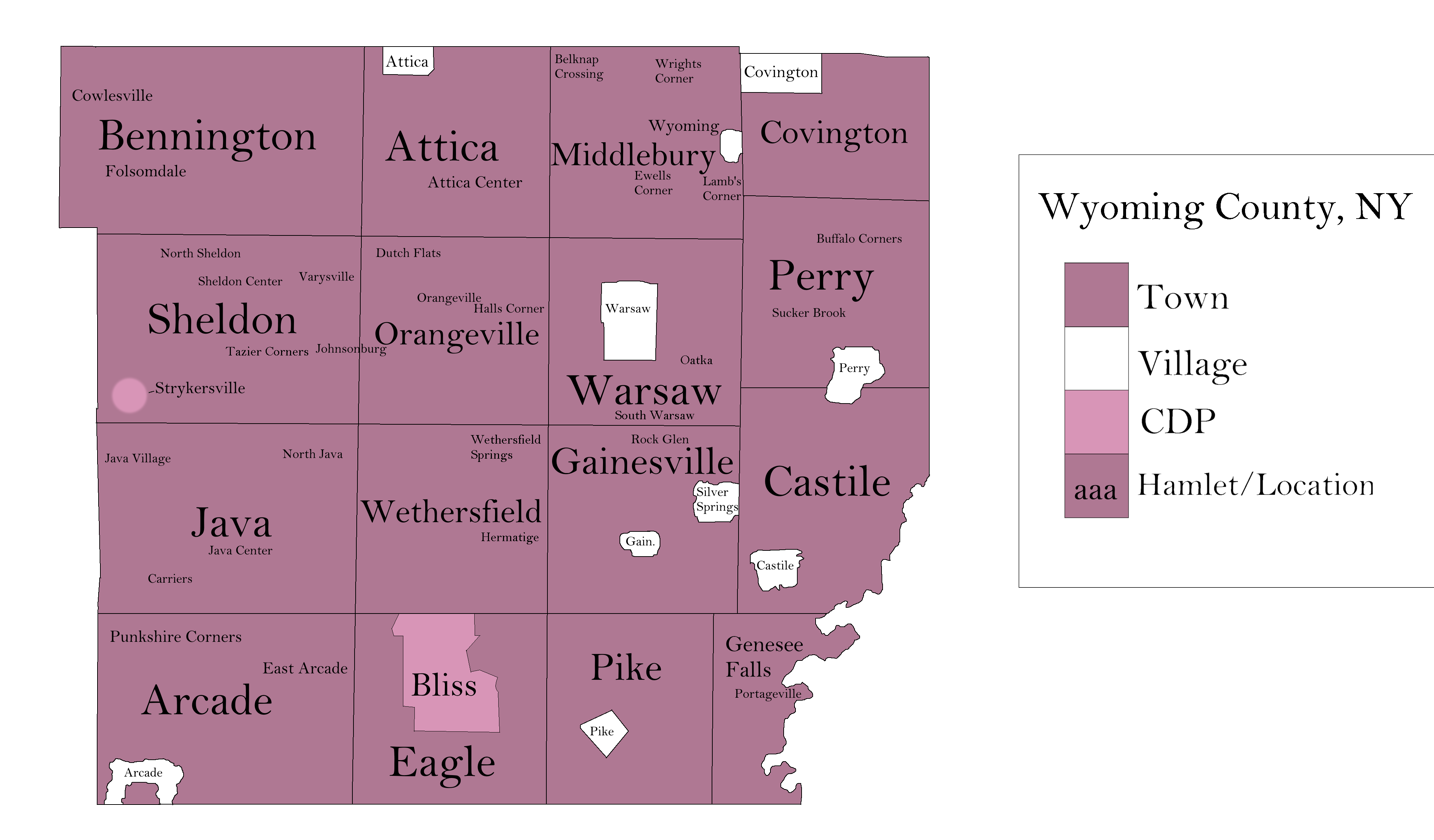
Map showing the Hamlets, Census Designated Places, and municipalities of Wyoming County. Wyoming County does not have any cities or reservations.

=== Larger Settlements ===
#	Location	Population	Type	Sector
2	Perry	3,536	Village	Northeast
1	†Warsaw	3,646	Village	Northeast
3	‡Attica	2,547	Village	Northwest
4	Arcade	2,071	Village	Southwest
5	Castile	1,015	Village	Southeast
6	Silver Springs	782	Village	Southeast
7	Strykersville	647	CDP	Northwest
8	Bliss	527	CDP	Southwest
9	Wyoming	434	Village	Northeast
10	Pike	371	Hamlet/CDP	Southeast
11	Gainesville	304	Village	Southeast

=== Towns ===
- Arcade
- Attica
- Bennington
- Castile
- Covington
- Eagle
- Gainesville
- Genesee Falls
- Java
- Middlebury
- Orangeville
- Perry
- Pike
- Sheldon
- Warsaw
- Wethersfield

=== Hamlets ===
- North Java
- Portageville
- Silver Lake Institute

== Education ==
School districts include:

- Alden Central School District
- Alexander Central School District
- Attica Central School District
- Dalton-Nunda Central School District (Keshequa)
- Fillmore Central School District
- Holland Central School District
- Iroquois Central School District
- Letchworth Central School District
- Pavilion Central School District
- Perry Central School District
- Warsaw Central School District
- Wyoming Central School District
- York Central School District
- Yorkshire-Pioneer Central School District

== Notable people ==
- James H. Agen, (1847–1921), Wisconsin State Assemblyman
- Joseph M. Bailey, (1833–1895) born in Middlebury, Chief Justice of the Illinois Supreme Court
- Daniel F. Bakeman, last surviving veteran of the American Revolutionary War
- Susan (née Brewer) Bakeman and Daniel F. Bakeman share the longest claimed marriage on record and also the only marriage claimed to have exceeded 90 years.
- Calvin Fairbank, (1816–1898), born in Allegany County (now Wyoming County), Methodist clergyman and staunch abolitionist.
- Ed Don George, (1905–1985), born in North Java, New York, professional wrestler, naval commander.
- John Victor Skiff, (1908–1964), born in Gainesville; environmental conservationist and public servant.
- David Starr Jordan, (1851–1931), born in Gainesville; an ichthyologist, educator and peace activist.
- Barber Conable, born in Warsaw. US Representative, former head of the World Bank.
- Chester A. Arthur, lived for a time in Perry. U. S. President.
- Thomas Aquinas Daly, b. 1937. Resident of Arcade. Artist.
- Ray Witter (1896–1983), American football player
- James R. Doolittle, U.S. Senator during Abraham Lincoln's administration

== See also ==
- List of counties in New York
- National Register of Historic Places listings in Wyoming County, New York
