= New York State Route 78 =

State highway in western New York, United States

New York State Route 78
- Map of western New York with NY 78 highlighted in red

Route information
- Maintained by NYSDOT, Erie County, and the city of Lockport
- Length: 73.49 mi (118.27 km)
- Existed: 1930–present

Major junctions
- South end: NY 19 near Gainesville village
- NY 400 in East Aurora; US 20 at the Elma–West Seneca line; I-90 Toll / New York Thruway in Cheektowaga; NY 324 in Amherst; NY 31 in Lockport city; NY 104 in Lockport town
- North end: NY 18 in Olcott

Location
- Country: United States
- State: New York
- Counties: Wyoming, Erie, Niagara

Highway system
- New York Highways; Interstate; US; State; Reference; Parkways
← I-78	→ NY 79

New York State Route 78 (NY 78) is a 73.49-mile-long (118.27 km) state highway in western New York in the United States. While it is signed north–south, the southern portion runs in an east–west direction across Wyoming and Erie counties, from its beginning at a junction with NY 19 north of the village of Gainesville to the village of East Aurora. The part of the route north of East Aurora follows a generally north–south alignment to an intersection with NY 18 in the Niagara County town of Newfane (at the hamlet of Olcott), just south of the Lake Ontario shoreline. The route is most closely identified in the region with Transit Road, a major north–south trunk road through the center of Erie and Niagara counties; however, NY 78 does not follow Transit Road for its entire length, nor does Transit Road comprise more than half its length. The highway joins Transit Road north of East Aurora and stays with the road until nearly its end in the city of Lockport.

The section of NY 78 between NY 5 in the town of Amherst and the Lake Ontario shoreline in Newfane was originally designated New York State Route 32 in the mid-1920s. In the 1930 renumbering of state highways in New York, NY 32 was absorbed into NY 78, which ran from Gainesville to Newfane upon assignment. From East Aurora to Depew, NY 78 originally used a slightly more easterly alignment along several local streets and a section of NY 422. Two realignments in the 1930s moved the route onto its modern alignment, and NY 78's original routing between East Aurora and Depew was briefly designated NY 78A during the mid-1930s.

== Route description ==
=== Wyoming County ===
NY 78 begins at an intersection with NY 19 at the northern end of the Wyoming County village of Gainesville. NY 78 proceeds westward from NY 19 as Delhi Road, a two-lane residential road through the rural sections of Gainesville. At a junction with Dolph Road, NY 78 bends southwest, dropping the Delhi Road moniker, and soon entering the hamlet of Wethersfield, located in the town of the same name. In Wethersfield, NY 78 is a two-lane residential street, intersecting with the northern terminus of County Route 10 (CR 10; Hardys Road) and southern terminus of CR 4 (Hermitage Road).

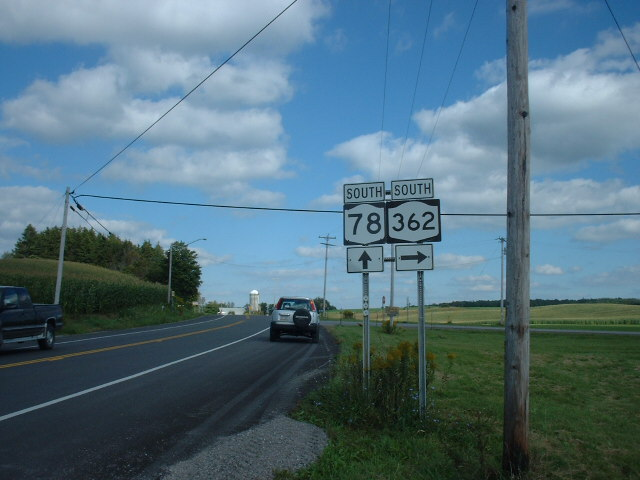
NY 78 southbound at the junction with the northern terminus of NY 362 in Wethersfield

After the hamlet of Wethersfield, NY 78 continues southwest, crossing through rural farms as a two-lane roadway, intersecting with the southern terminus of CR 57 (Poplar Tree Road). A short distance after CR 57, NY 78 intersects with the northern terminus of NY 362 while winding southwest through Wethersfield. At the intersection with Maxwell Drive, NY 78 becomes westbound, remaining rural for several miles. After the intersection with Irish Road, NY 78 makes a gradual bend to the southwest, then north. At the end of this bend, NY 78 intersects with the eastern terminus of CR 54 (Chaffee Road) and the northern terminus of CR 11 (East Arcade Road).

Now in the town of Java, NY 78 uses the right-of-way once used by CR 11 northbound, winding past several farms as it proceeds northward. A short distance to the north, NY 78 intersects with NY 98 southbound. Both NY 78 north and NY 98 south turn west on a wrong-way concurrency through the town of Java, running as a two-lane residential street through dense woods and wide fields. Continuing west through Java, NY 78 and NY 98 cross over a railroad line and enter the hamlet of Java Center. In Java Center, NY 78 and NY 98 intersect with the southern terminus of NY 77 (Cattaraugus Road). This intersection also doubles as the terminus of the NY 78 and NY 98 concurrency as NY 98 proceeds south on NY 77's right-of-way.

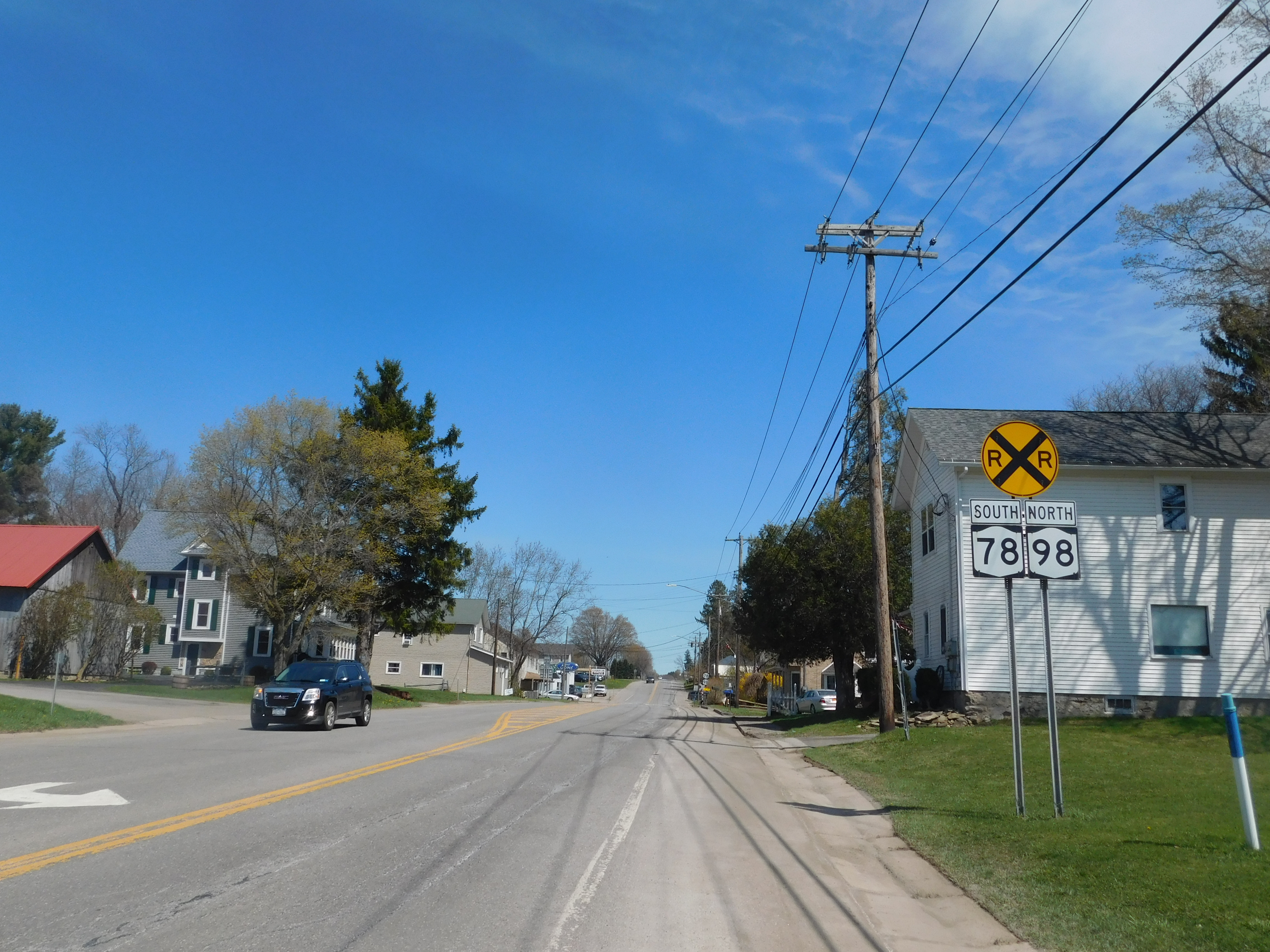
NY 78 southbound along the wrong-way concurrency through Java Center with NY 98 northbound

NY 78 bends northwest on Main Street and out of Java Center as a two-lane rural roadway through the town of Java. The route soon drops the Main Street moniker, winding northwest into an intersection with CR 44 (Curriers Road). After CR 44, NY 78 runs northwest as a two-lane residential road, passing numerous houses before intersecting with the eastern terminus of CR 15 (Holland Road). After an intersection with Elm Road, NY 78 regains the Main Street moniker, crossing into the town of Sheldon and into the hamlet of Strykersville. Through Strykersville, NY 78 is a two-lane residential street, intersecting with the western terminus of CR 9 (Perry Road) and the southern terminus of CR 35 (Dutch Hollow Road).

After CR 35, NY 78 bends northwest out of Strykersville, crossing into the rural sections of Sheldon surrounding the hamlet. Near the intersection with Chester Street, NY 78 crosses the county line into Erie County and into the town of Wales.

=== Erie County ===
==== Wales to West Seneca ====
Now in the Erie County town of Wales, NY 78 changes monikers from Main Street to Strykersville Road, paralleling Buffalo Creek northwest through the rural section of Wales. A short distance northwest, NY 78 intersects with CR 175 (Center Line Road), which connects to the Wyoming County line a short distance east. For a short distance after the intersection, the two routes parallel, with NY 78 bypassing the hamlet of Wales Hollow and intersecting with the northern terminus of CR 387 (East Creek Road). Still known as Strykersville Road, NY 78 parallels Buffalo Creek into the southern terminus of CR 385 (Schang Road). The two-lane rural roadway remains the same for several miles to the northwest, crossing an intersection with CR 382 (Hunters Creek Road).

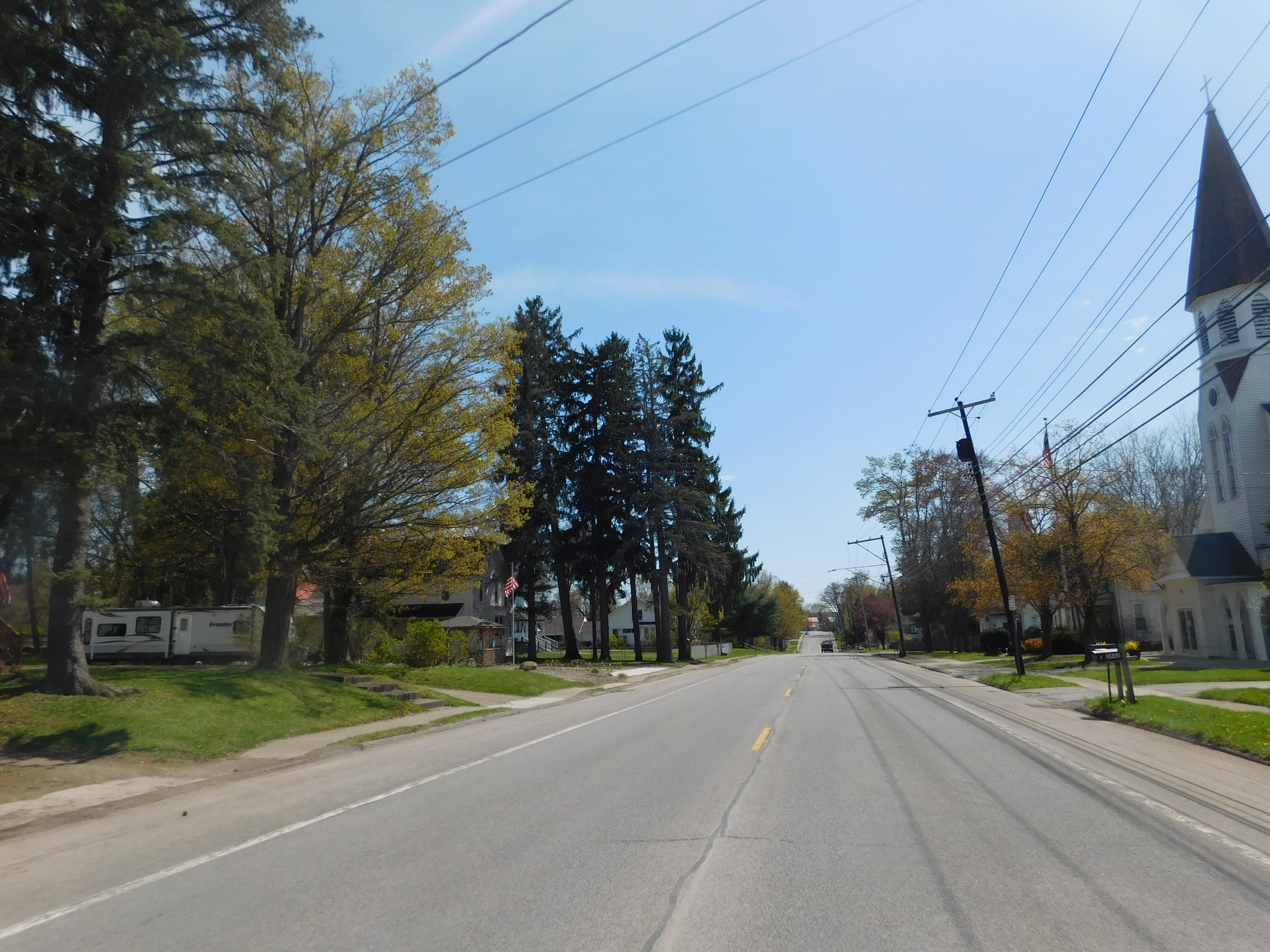
NY 78 southbound in Strykersville

Continuing northwest through Wales, NY 78 remains a two-lane rural street known as Strykersville Road until intersecting with US 20A (Big Tree Road) at a T-intersection. US 20A and NY 78 become concurrent along Big Tree, proceeding west through the town of Wales. The routes remain a two-lane residential street for a distance, intersecting with CR 383 (Reiter Road) as it winds west. Now in the town of Aurora, US 20A and NY 78 enter a large interchange with NY 400 (the Aurora Expressway). A short distance later, the routes enter the village of East Aurora. Now known as Main Street, US 20A and NY 78 proceed west as a two-lane village street, intersecting with NY 16 (Olean Road) and the southern continuation of CR 6 (Pine Street).

NY 16 joins the US 20A and NY 78 concurrency as it proceeds west on Main Street, becoming the main commercial thoroughfare through the village. The routes cross over railroad tracks in the center of East Aurora, returning to the residential street it was earlier, which reverts at Center Street. Several blocks to the west, US 20A, NY 16 and NY 78 enter a roundabout at the western end of East Aurora, where US 20A forks southwest on Hamburg Street, while NY 16 and NY 78 join up with CR 572 (Buffalo Street) and proceed northwest out of the village. Now in the town of Aurora once again, NY 16, NY 78 and CR 572 proceed northwest past Knox Farm State Park, intersecting with CR 377 (Williardshire Road). At CR 377, the moniker changes from Buffalo Street to Seneca Street as NY 16, NY 78 and CR 572 enter the town of Elma.

Passing the town water tower, NY 16, NY 78 and CR 572 proceed northwest through Elma as a two-lane commercial and residential road, intersecting with the western terminus of CR 528 (West Blood Road). The routes slowly becomes commercial once again, passing a large industrial building before entering an at-grade interchange with CR 574 (Jamison Road). Before 1980, this intersection served as the western terminus of NY 422. After CR 574, NY 16, NY 78 and CR 572 continue northwest along Seneca Street as a two-lane residential roadway through Elma. Bending northwest, the routes enter the hamlet of Spring Brook, where it intersects with CR 140 (Rice Road) and CR 362 (North Davis Road).

Paralleling Cazenovia Creek, NY 16, NY 78 and CR 572 intersect with the southern terminus of CR 95 (Pound Road). The route remains a two-lane residential road for a distance, soon bending further northwestward into the town of West Seneca. In West Seneca, the three routes intersect with US 20 (Transit Road). At this intersection, NY 78 turns north onto a concurrency with US 20 while NY 16 proceeds northwest along CR 215. This junction serves as the northern terminus of CR 572. Now concurrent with US 20, NY 78 runs north along Transit Road as a four-lane commercial boulevard, quickly entering a cloverleaf interchange with NY 400 (the Aurora Expressway) once again.

==== Transit Road ====
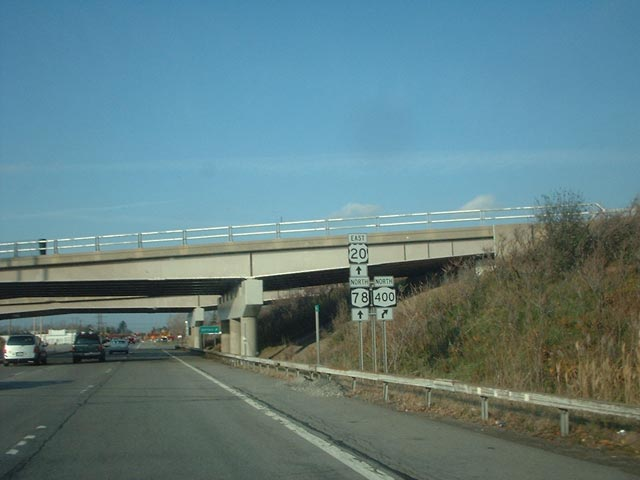
US 20 and NY 78, eastbound and northbound, respectively, at the interchange with NY 400 in West Seneca

US 20 and NY 78 proceed northward along Transit Road, remaining a major commercial thoroughfare street serving the eastern suburbs of Buffalo with limited pockets of residential along its run. Throughout its north–south run to the Erie County–Niagara County line to the north, Transit Road serves as the town line boundaries of West Seneca and Elma, Cheektowaga and Lancaster, and Amherst and Clarence, respectively, except for a brief period where it passes through the Village of Depew, which straddles the Cheektowaga-Lancaster line.

After an intersection with CR 330 (Bullis Road), Transit Road continues north as a five lane road, serving as the town line between West Seneca to the west and Elma to the east, paralleling several residential districts on each side and crossing an intersection with CR 325 (Seneca Creek Road / Main Street). Just after CR 325, US 20 and NY 78 proceed over Buffalo Creek and into an intersection with NY 354 (Clinton Street). Now on the Lancaster–Cheektowaga town line, US 20 and NY 78 continue northward along Transit Road, intersecting with the western terminus of CR 321 (French Road).

Passing several strip malls, US 20 and NY 78 continue north along Transit Road, passing several residential complexes. After Madeira Drive, Transit Road becomes a four-lane industrial boulevard again, passing several businesses on each side of the road. The routes become commercial again, intersecting with CR 523 (Como Park Boulevard). Paralleling Cayuga Creek to the west, US 20 and NY 78 become a four-lane commercial boulevard again. A short distance later, the routes cross over Cayuga Creek and enter an intersection with the western terminus of NY 130 (Broadway). At this junction, NY 78 continues north on Transit Road, while US 20 turns east onto Broadway through the village of Depew.

Continuing north on Transit Road, NY 78 becomes a four-lane commercial boulevard through Depew, crossing over railroad tracks owned by CSX Transportation and used by Amtrak just east of the village's Amtrak station. After crossing the tracks, NY 78 intersects with Walden Avenue (NY 952Q), a major arterial out of the city of Buffalo. Continuing north through Depew, NY 78 intersects with the eastern terminus of CR 316 (George Urban Boulevard). Continuing north through Depew, NY 78 and Transit Road remain the four-lane commercial boulevard through the center of town, passing numerous businesses. Outside of the village, NY 78 connects to CR 161 (Pleasant View Drive).

NY 78 and Transit Road remain four lanes, passing several commercial businesses and entering an intersection with NY 33 (Genesee Street) and crossing over Ellicott Creek. The route crosses over a former railroad grade, soon intersecting with CR 324 (Aero Drive). Just after CR 324, NY 78 and Transit Road enter an intersection with the feeder roads to exit 49 of the New York State Thruway (I-90). NY 78 and Transit Road north of I-90 continues as the town line of Amherst to the west and Lancaster to the east. After crossing Wehrle Drive (CR 290 and CR 275), transit road serves as the town line of Amherst to the west and Clarence to the east until the Erie County line.

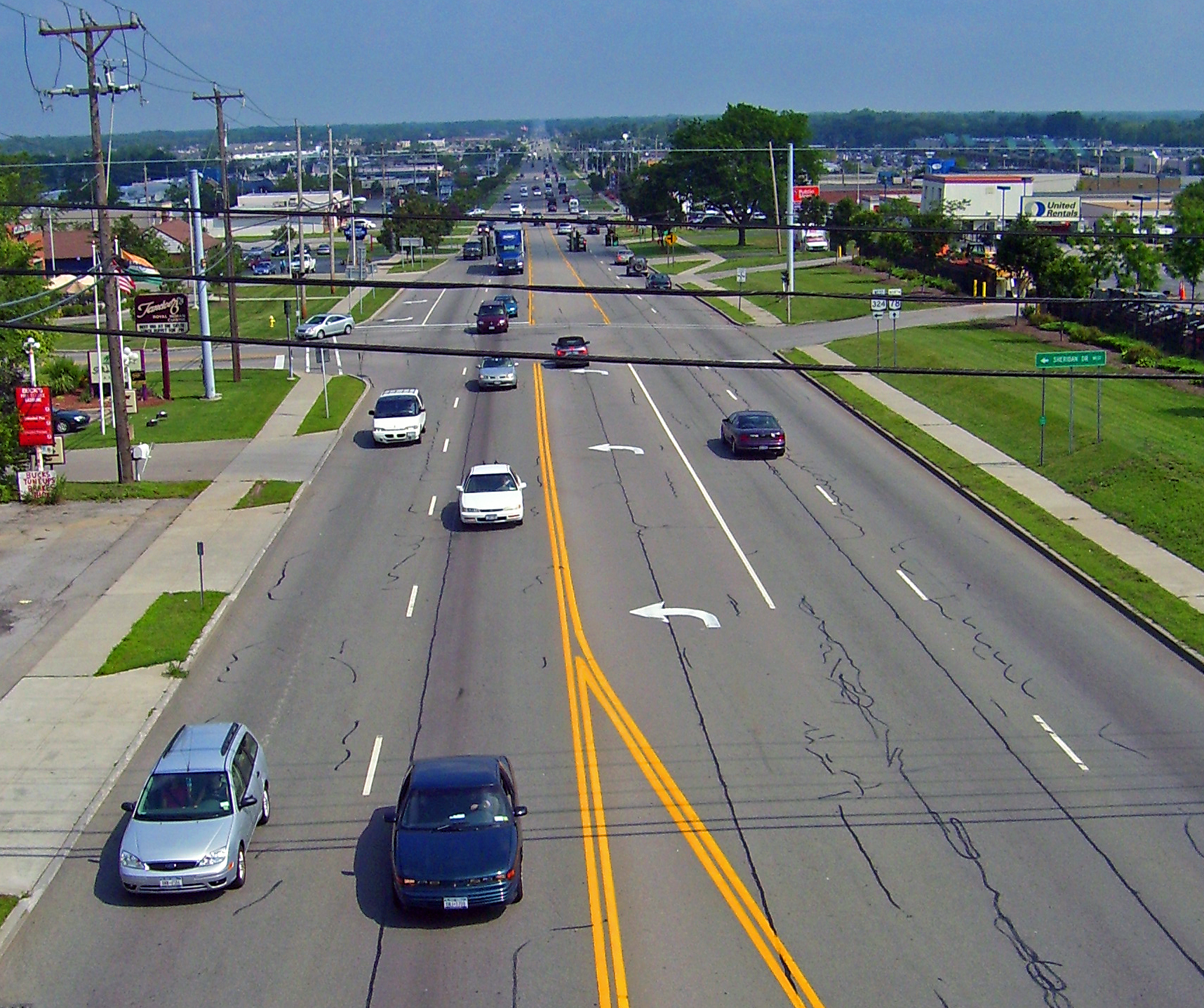
Looking north along Transit Road through Amherst from the Sheridan Drive (NY 324) overpass

North of Wehrle Drive, Transit Road widens to six and then eight lanes wide as it passes through a dense commercial shopping distance along the Amherst-Clarence town line until NY 5 (Main Street). The route condenses back to six lanes along the Eastern Hills Mall in Clarence, entering an intersection with a feeder road that connects to NY 324 (Sheridan Drive). NY 78 and Transit Road continue north, crossing under NY 324 and condense down to four lanes once again. NY 78 passes through more strip malls to the north of NY 324. Continuing north, NY 78 intersects with the termini of CR 192 (Maple Road) and CR 37 (Greiner Road).

Remaining a four-lane boulevard, NY 78 and Transit Road passes east of Transit Middle School. NY 78 intersects with the western terminus of CR 217 (Clarence Center Road). Passing east of Transit Valley Country Club, the road enters the hamlet of East Amherst at CR 296 (Casey Road). The route continues northward, intersecting with CR 299 (North French Road) and CR 282 (Country Road). Soon entering the hamlet of Swormville, NY 78 and Transit Road remain a four-lane commercial boulevard through Amherst and Clarence. After Swormville, NY 78 and Transit Road become residential, soon becoming two lanes for the first time since West Seneca.

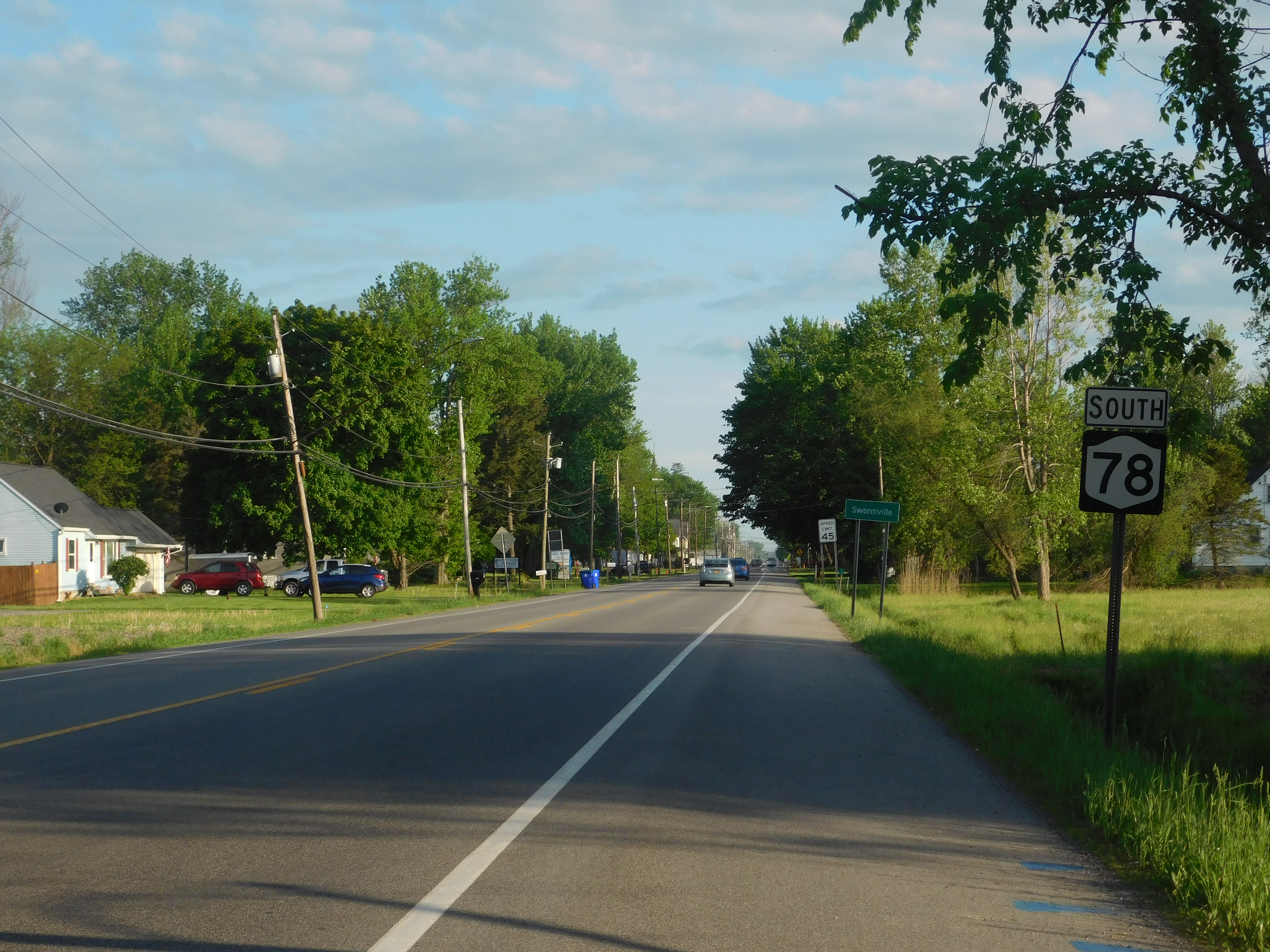
NY 78 southbound in Swormville

Crossing north along the Amherst-Clarence line still, NY 78 and Transit Road becomes a mix of commercial and residential, passing large sections of fields north of Swormville. A short distance to the north, NY 78 intersects with the northern terminus of NY 263 (Millersport Highway). After crossing an intersection with Tonawanda Creek Road (CR 2 and CR 559) that also doubled as the former intersection with NY 268, NY 78 and Transit Road widen to four lanes and cross over Tonawanda Creek into Niagara County.

=== Niagara County ===
After crossing Tonawanda Creek, NY 78 and Transit Road enter the town of Lockport as a four-lane boulevard. Intersecting with the western terminus of CR 117 and the eastern terminus of CR 60 (both North Tonawanda Creek Road), NY 78 and Transit Road continue north as the four-lane commercial boulevard through Lockport. The route remains four lanes, but becomes a boulevard through wide fields for a distance, passing runway 28 of North Buffalo Suburban Airport. Now in the town of Pendleton for a short distance, NY 78 and Transit Road cross through a long stretch of fields, becoming a commercial boulevard to the north.

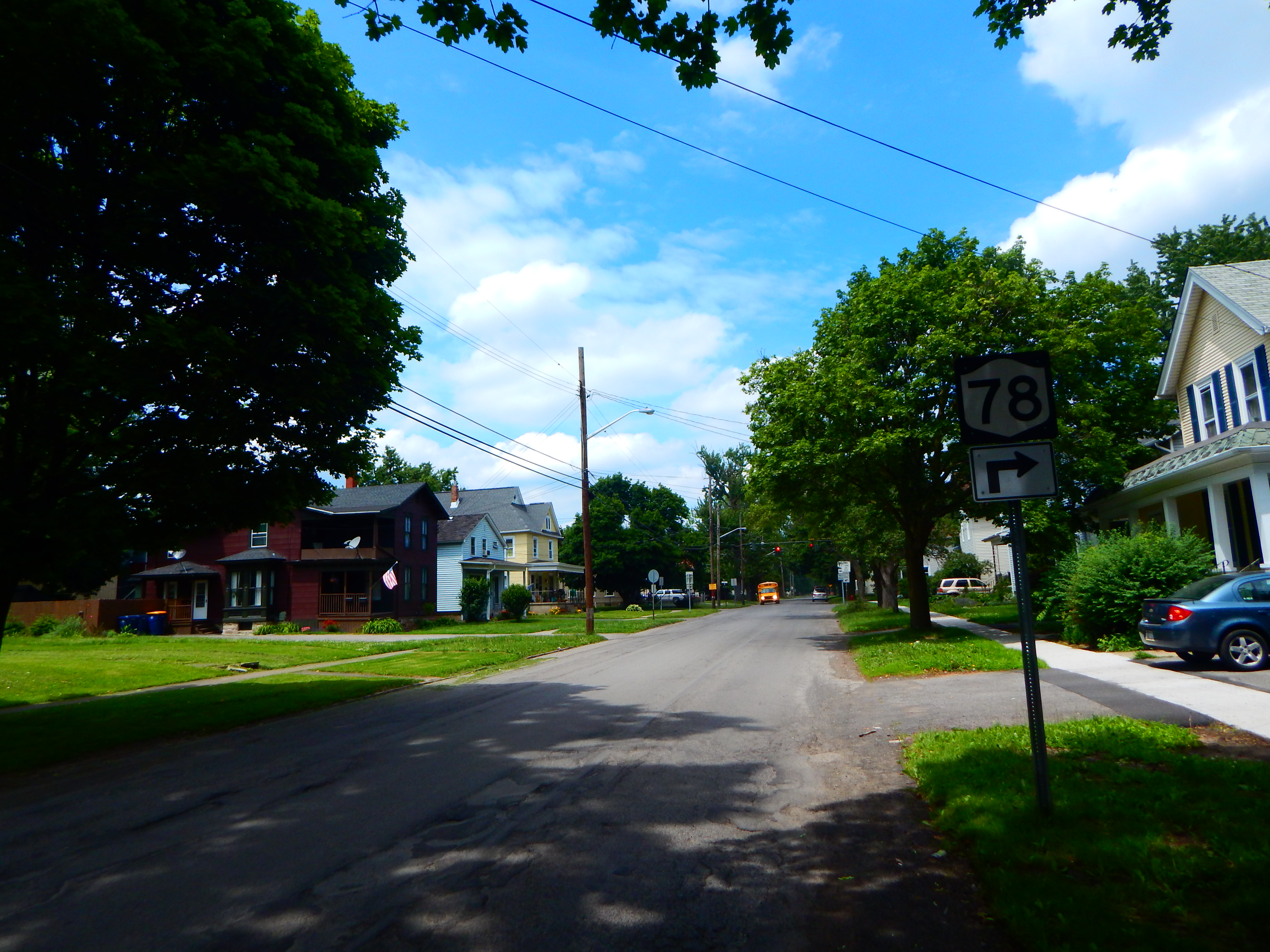
NY 78 through Lockport

After an intersection with CR 12 (Rapids Road), NY 78 and Transit Road continue north through Pendleton, soon crossing into the town of Lockport once again. In the town of Lockport, NY 78 changes monikers to South Transit Road, passing several commercial businesses, intersecting with NY 93 (Robinson Road). The four-lane boulevard continues north from NY 93 through the town of Lockport, passing a stretch of residences and homes as it enters the city of Lockport. Now a four-lane commercial boulevard, it passes several strip malls along South Transit Road. Now in the South Lockport hamlet outside of the city, in the town of Lockport, NY 78 and South Transit Road continue north, passing several stretches of residences.

The route becomes a residential/commercial mix as it passes through the city of Lockport, passing Altro Park before entering the center of the city. In the center of the city, NY 78 intersects with NY 31 (West Genesee Street and Walnut Street) just over the Erie Canal. At this junction, NY 78 changes monikers to North Transit Street, becoming a two-lane residential street north of the city center. Crossing over an ex-Erie Railroad line, the route intersects with Grand Street, where NY 78 turns east off North Transit Street onto Grand. East on Grand Street, NY 78 intersects with Clinton Street, where NY 78 turns north. Passing northeast of Upson Park, NY 78 continues northeast through Lockport on Clinton Street. The route becomes a two-lane residential street, passing Dolan Park and turning north on Lake Avenue.

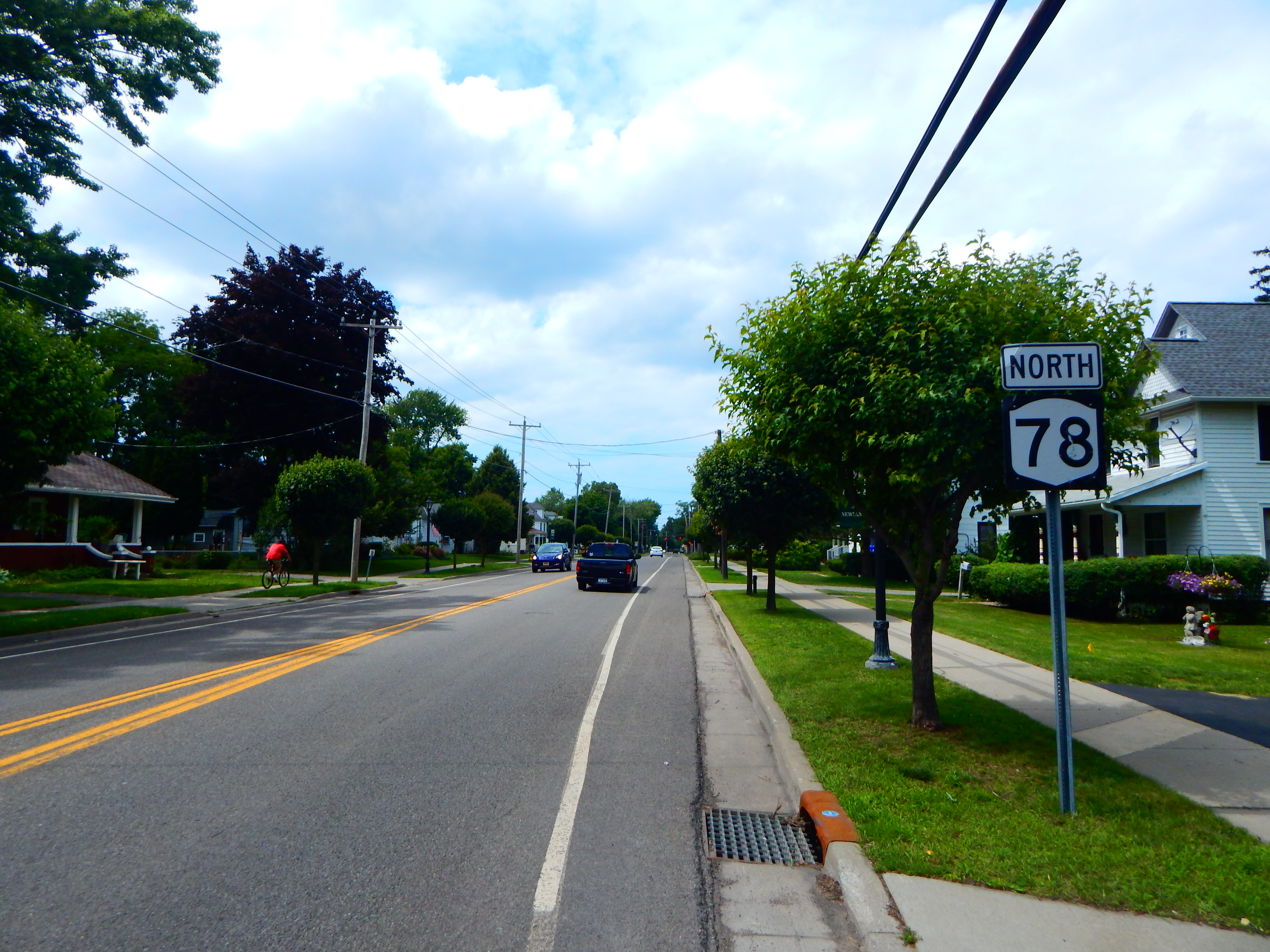
NY 78 through the hamlet of Newfane

Crossing back into the town of Lockport, NY 78 continues north along Lake Avenue, intersecting with CR 31 (Old Niagara Road). A short distance to the north, it enters the hamlet of Highland Park, winding northward as a two-lane commercial roadway. After crossing the western terminus of CR 7 (Slayton Settlement Road), NY 78 enters the Ridgelea Heights section of Lockport, crossing over the East Branch and west of Oak Run Golf Club. After the golf club, NY 78 expands to four lanes in the town of Newfane. In Newfane, NY 78 intersects with NY 104 east (Ridge Road) in the hamlet of Wrights Corners. NY 78 and NY 104 become concurrent northbound, becoming a four-lane commercial boulevard through the hamlet.

A short distance to the north, NY 78 and NY 104 fork in different directions, with NY 104 following Ridge Road to the northeast and NY 78 running along Lockport–Olcott Road to the northwest. Still in the town of Newfane, NY 78 proceeds northwest as a four-lane (quickly changing to two-lane) residential street. The route passes east of Bent-Wing Airport, continuing northwest through Newfane. The route remains residential for a distance, crossing over a brook on its way into the hamlet of Corwin. In Corwin, NY 78 remains a two-lane residential road, crossing over Somerset Railroad tracks that are operated by CSX Transportation (heading for the Somerset Power Plant near Camp Kenan) north of Jacques Avenue. Now paralleling Eighteenmile Creek, NY 78 intersects with the western terminus of CR 105 (Hatter Road). While winding northwest, the route soon enters the hamlet of Newfane.

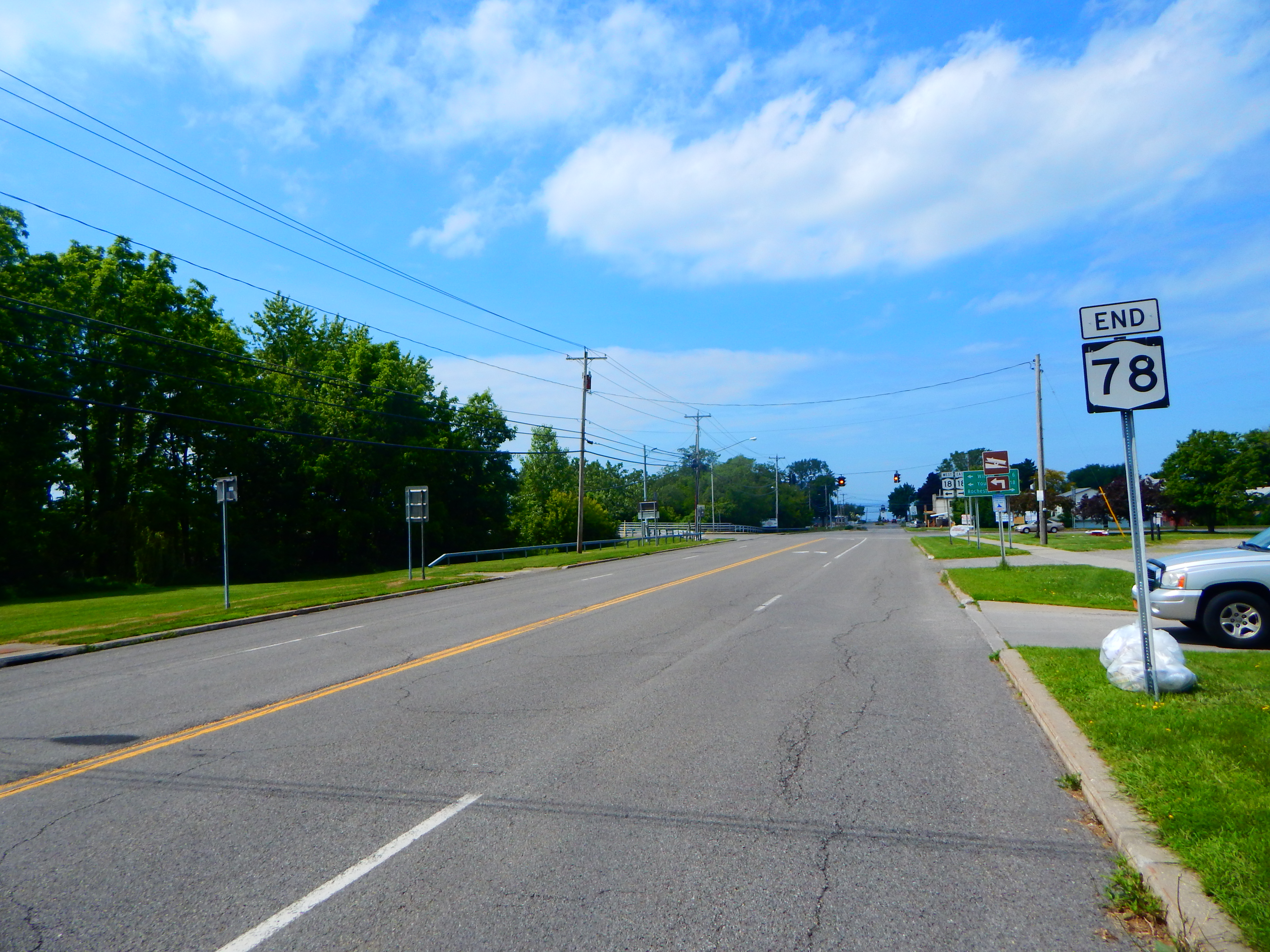
Signage denoting the end of NY 78 northbound at NY 18 in the hamlet of Olcott

Through the hamlet of Newfane, NY 78 winds northwest along Eighteenmile Creek, intersecting with CR 137 (Ewings Road). NY 78 through Newfane is a two-lane commercial street, marking the center of the hamlet. The route intersects with the eastern terminus of CR 91 (East Street). Paralleling Eighteenmile Creek out of Newfane, the route intersects with CR 104 (Ide Road)'s eastern terminus. Now running alongside the creek, NY 78 continues north through the town of Newfane, passing west of a public golf course, remaining a two-lane residential road through town.

After crossing the eastern terminus of CR 52 (Wilson–Burt Road), NY 78 continues north through the town of Newfane, entering the hamlet of Burt. Through Burt, the route passes a former railroad grade at Railroad Avenue and passes east of Fisherman's Park. Continuing north, NY 78 enters the hamlet of Olcott. In Olcott, NY 78 retains the name of Lockport–Olcott Road, becoming a two-lane residential road. The route soon bends northwest, intersecting with NY 18 (Lake Road) on the shore of Eighteenmile Creek. This intersection serves as the northern terminus of NY 78, while the right-of-way continues north as Lockport Street, which terminates at the shore of Lake Ontario.

== History ==
The north–south roadway connecting NY 5 in Amherst to the Lake Ontario shoreline in Olcott via Lockport was originally designated as NY 32 in the mid-1920s. In the 1930 renumbering of state highways in New York, NY 32 became part of NY 78, a new route extending from Gainesville in the south to Olcott in the north, mostly along existing but previously unnumbered roads. However, the portion between NY 362 and NY 19 was in the process of being built. NY 78's early routing was identical to its modern alignment except from East Aurora to Depew. Initially, NY 78 headed north from East Aurora to Lancaster by way of Maple Street, Jamison and Bowen roads, and Clinton (NY 354) and Aurora streets before following NY 35 west to Transit Road in Depew.

NY 78 was realigned c. 1932 to follow US 20 (now US 20A) west from East Aurora to Transit Road, where it turned north onto Transit Road and followed it to Depew. The former routing of NY 78 between East Aurora and Lancaster was redesignated as NY 78A. NY 78 was rerouted one last time c. 1939 to overlap with NY 16 northwest from East Aurora to its junction with Transit Road in West Seneca. The realignment bypassed the southernmost portion of Transit Road, which became NY 187 in the early 1940s.

== NY 78A ==
New York State Route 78A
- Location: East Aurora–Lancaster village
- Existed: c. 1932–c. 1938

NY 78A was an alternate route of NY 78 in Erie County between NY 78 in East Aurora and NY 35 (now US 20) in Lancaster. The route began at the modern intersection of Main (then-US 20) and Maple streets in East Aurora and followed Maple Street, Jamison and Bowen roads, and Clinton (NY 354) and Aurora streets to a terminus at Broadway (NY 35) in Lancaster. It was assigned c. 1932 after NY 78 was rerouted to follow US 20 and Transit Road instead between East Aurora and Depew. The NY 78A designation was short-lived as it was removed c. 1938. Its routing is now part of several county routes as well as NY 354.

== Major intersections ==
County	Location	mi	km	Destinations	Notes
Wyoming	Town of Gainesville	0.00	0.00	NY 19 – Warsaw, Gainesville	Southern terminus
Wyoming	Wethersfield	6.67	10.73	NY 362 south – Bliss	Northern terminus of NY 362
Wyoming	Java	12.58	20.25	NY 98 north – Attica	Eastern terminus of NY 78 / NY 98 overlap
Wyoming	Java	15.19	24.45	NY 77 north / NY 98 south (Cattaraugus Road) – Bennington Center, Arcade	Hamlet of Java Center; western terminus of NY 78 / NY 98 overlap; southern terminus of NY 77
Erie	Wales	27.77	44.69	US 20A east (Big Tree Road) – Warsaw	Eastern terminus of US 20A / NY 78 overlap
Erie	Town of Aurora	30.01	48.30	NY 400 north (Aurora Expressway) – Buffalo	Interchange
Erie	East Aurora	30.76	49.50	NY 16 south (Olean Road)	Eastern terminus of NY 16 / NY 78 overlap
Erie	East Aurora	31.82	51.21	US 20A west (Hamburg Street)	Western terminus of US 20A / NY 78 overlap
Erie	Elma	34.87	56.12	CR 574 (Jamison Road)	Former western terminus of NY 422
Erie	Elma–West Seneca line	37.36	60.13	US 20 west (Transit Road) / NY 16 north (Seneca Street)	Western terminus of NY 16 / NY 78 overlap; southern terminus of US 20 / NY 78 overlap
Erie	Elma–West Seneca line	37.86	60.93	NY 400 (Aurora Expressway) – East Aurora, Buffalo	Interchange
Erie	Elma–West Seneca line	39.65	63.81	NY 354 (Clinton Street)	
Erie	Depew	42.55	68.48	US 20 east / NY 130 west (Broadway)	Northern terminus of US 20 / NY 78 overlap; eastern terminus of NY 130
Erie	Lancaster–Cheektowaga town line	45.04	72.48	NY 33 (Genesee Street)	Hamlet of Bowmansville
Erie	Lancaster–Cheektowaga town line	45.67	73.50	I-90 Toll / New York Thruway – Buffalo, Albany	Exit 49 on I-90 / Thruway
Erie	Clarence–Amherst town line	46.94	75.54	NY 5 (Main Street)	
Erie	Clarence–Amherst town line	47.92	77.12	NY 324 (Sheridan Drive) – Niagara Falls	
Erie	Clarence–Amherst town line	54.99	88.50	NY 263 south (Millersport Highway)	Hamlet of Millersport; northern terminus of NY 263
Niagara	Lockport–Pendleton town line	58.45	94.07	NY 93 (Robinson Road)	Hamlet of South Lockport
Niagara	City of Lockport	60.93	98.06	NY 31 (West Genesee Street / Walnut Street)	
Niagara	Lockport–Newfane town line	65.07	104.72	NY 104 west (Ridge Road) – Lewiston	Hamlet of Wrights Corners; southern terminus of NY 78 / NY 104 overlap
Niagara	Town of Newfane	65.38	105.22	NY 104 east (Ridge Road) – Rochester	Northern terminus of NY 78 / NY 104 overlap
Niagara	Town of Newfane	73.49	118.27	NY 18 (Lake Road) – Wilson, Youngstown, Rochester	Northern terminus; hamlet of Olcott
1.000 mi = 1.609 km; 1.000 km = 0.621 mi: Concurrency terminus; Electronic toll collection
