= Gordon F. Allen =

Gordon F. Allen (1908–1973) was an American professor and academic administrator at the State University of New York at Brockport. The Allen Administration Building at Brockport is named after him.

Allen was born in Gainesville, New York. He studied at Houghton College, Cornell University and received a doctorate from the University at Buffalo. He worked as a high school teacher before joining SUNY Brockport as a professor of education.

During his 23 years at Brockport, he served in a number of administrative posts: Chairman of the Department of Education and Psychology, Dean of the college, Vice President for Academic Affairs, and the Acting President of the college in 1964–65.
