= John Victor Skiff =

American conservationist (1908–1964)

J. Victor Skiff
- Born: July 23, 1908; Gainesville, New York
- Died: September 15, 1964 (aged 56); Castleton-on-Hudson, New York
- Children: 3

J. Victor Skiff (July 23, 1908 – September 15, 1964) was a prominent New York State conservationist and career public servant. Public service positions in NYS included Superintendent of Inland Fisheries, Deputy Commissioner of Conservation, and acting Commissioner of Conservation.

== Childhood ==
J. Victor Skiff was born July 23, 1908, to John Milton Skiff and Winifred E. Hughes, in Gainesville, NY. Victor's Mother, Winifred, died in 1917 at the age of 38. John M. Skiff was the editor of the Gainesville Press, and died of pneumonia following Spanish influenza, in 1918, orphaning Victor at the age of 10. He was then cared for by his uncle, Arthur Garfield Adams, and aunt, Minerva Adams (Skiff). As an adult, at a talk presented to Scouters of the Adirondack Council, he shared that "his boyhood experience in a Scout Troop in Ithaca had developed his interest in the out-or-doors and led to his work in conservation." In 1926, at the age of 18, Victor married Kay Marie Sweeney.

== Education ==
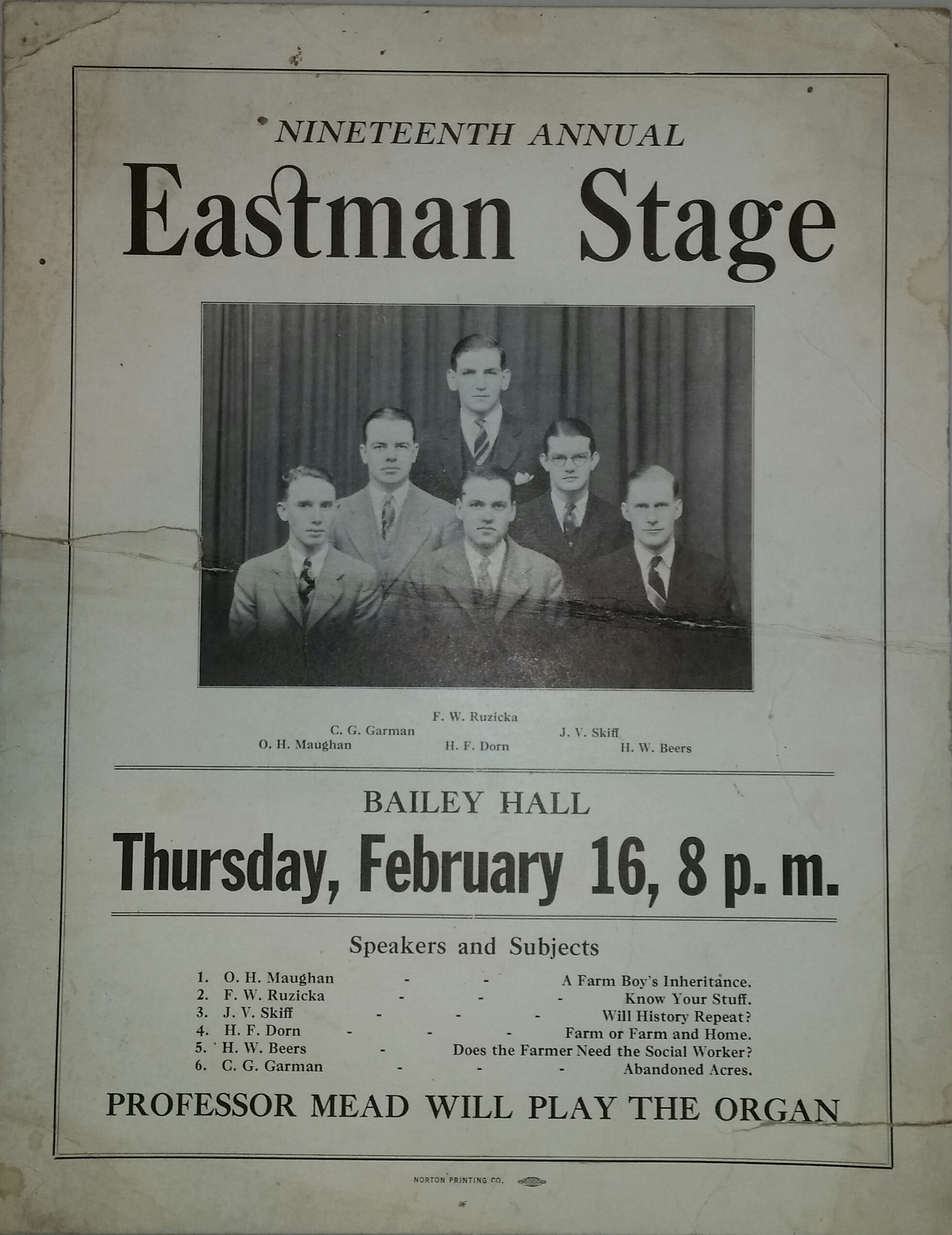
J Victor Skiff competing in the finals of the Eastman Stage Public Speaking Contest, Cornell University, 1928

Vic attended Ithaca Public Schools for 7th and 8th grade, finishing in 1922.

For high school, he attended the world-renowned Starkey Seminary (later renamed Lakemont Academy for Boys), located on Seneca Lake near Watkins Glen, NY, graduating in 1925.

He began his undergraduate studies at Cornell University, in the fall of 1925. In his junior and senior year of college, he qualified for the finals of the 19th and 20th Annual Eastman Stage Contest, respectively, a public speaking contest held in connection with the annual Farm and Home week of the Agricultural College, speaking on the subject "Will History Repeat?" and "Getting Your Money's Worth" as a junior and senior, respectively. He graduated with a B.S. from the Agricultural College at Cornell in 1929.

== Early career ==
He taught general science for three and a half years, from 1929 to 1932. During this period he was also active with the Boy Scouts. The summer after graduating from Cornell in 1929, he served as head of the Naturalists' Division of Camp Rodney in Maryland. He served as Scoutmaster of Troop No. 46 in Scotia, NY, from the fall of 1929 to the spring of 1930.

== Public career ==
J. Victor Skiff was a career man in the New York State Department of Conservation, entering the department as a game research investigator in the Bureau of Game in 1933. He served as a game research investigator until 1937 when the position Assistant Superintendent of Game was created, and he was appointed to it. In 1938 he became Superintendent of Inland Fisheries. In 1941 he served as one of three commissioners from NYS on the Atlantic States Marine Fisheries Compact Commission. In 1941 he also represented the NYS Conservation Department as a New York-Rhode Island Boundary Commissioner. In 1944 he was appointed Deputy Commissioner under the Republican administration of Thomas E. Dewey. He served as acting Commissioner after the death of then Commissioner John A. White on December 31, 1944, at age 43 until Governor Thomas E. Dewey appointed Perry Duryea as Commissioner in 1945. He was retained as Deputy by the newly appointed Commissioner Perry Duryea. In 1954, when Democrat W. Averell Harriman was elected as governor, Skiff resigned and served as a GOP legislative consultant. In 1959, when Republican Nelson Rockefeller took office as governor, Victor was reappointed as Deputy Commissioner, a position he served in until his untimely death in 1964.

== Personal life ==
He was a member of the Fort Orange Club. He was one of the first vestrymen at St. David's Church in East Greenbush.

== Death ==
J. Victor Skiff died on September 15, 1964, after suffering a heart attack, at the age of 56.

== Memorials to J. Victor Skiff ==
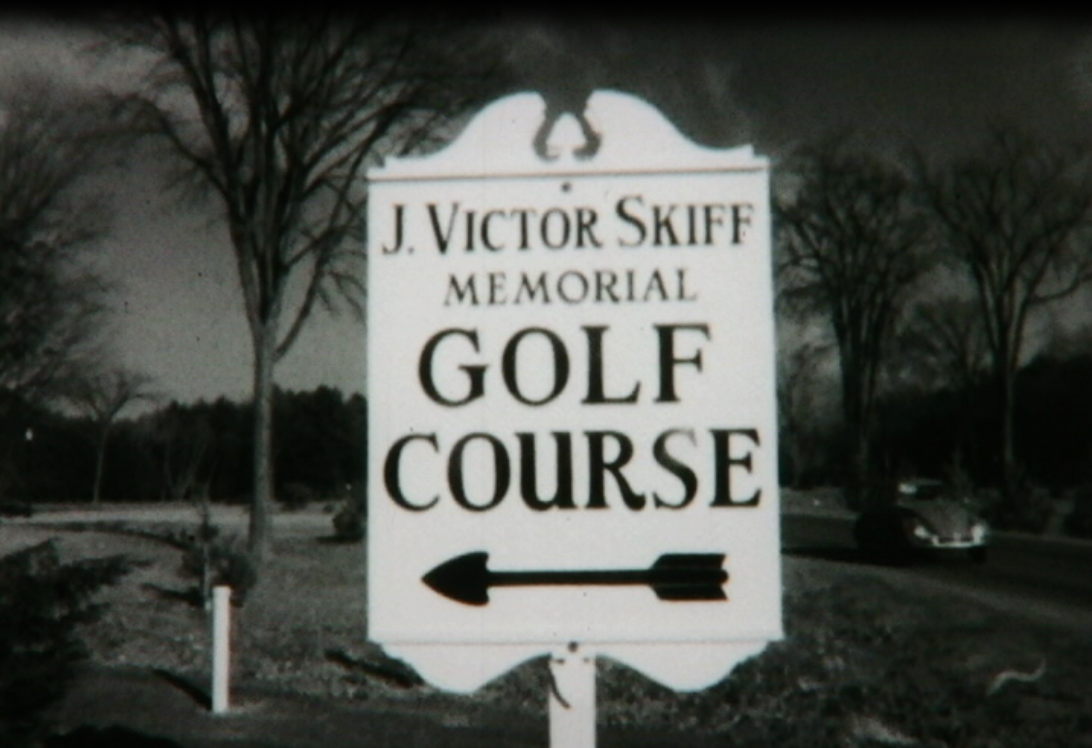
J Victor Skiff Memorial Golf Course sign, c. 1964

- J. Victor Skiff Memorial Golf Course: a 29 par golf course in Saratoga Spa State Park. A bronze plaque was unveiled by Harold G. Wilm, NYS Conservation Deputy Commissioner, and Vic's son Joseph Skiff in October 1964, naming the course for J Victor Skiff, and ceremonies marking the naming of the course took place in the small course clubhouse. The course is currently named the 29 Par Executive Course.
- On October 3, 1964, the Adirondack Park Association, renamed in 1983 to Adirondack North Country Association (ANCA), recorded a resolution in appreciation for his "...invaluable public service to the people of the State in general and to conservationists and sportsmen in particular..."
- The Spire and Corillon for St. David's Church in East Greenbush were made possible in part through the J. Victor Skiff Memorial Fund.

== Publications by J. Victor Skiff ==
=== Articles ===
- Skiff, J.V. "Licking Starvation: How the state of New York is preventing the loss of her deer during severe winters". Field & Stream, December 1934, p. 21,64-65.
- Skiff, J.V. "New York State's New Game Breeding Law". Transactions of the North American Game Conference, 21, 1935, p. 251-255.
- Skiff, J.V. "Inside Your Department". New York State Conservationist, 1(2), October–November 1946, p. 6-7.
- Skiff, J.V. "Inside Your Department, The Division of Fish and Game", New York State Conservationist, 1(3), December 1946, p. 10-11, 29.
- Skiff, V. "The Care and Feeding of Fishermen". New York State Conservationist, 1(6), June–July 1947, p. 24-25.
- Skiff, J.V. "The Whitetail in New York". New York State Conservationist, 2(2), October–November 1947, p. 6-7.
- Skiff, J.V. "Is there a place for stocking in game management?" Trans. N. Am. Wildl. Conf., 13, 1948, p. 215-227.
- Skiff, J.V. "1948 Legislative Hopper". New York State Conservationist, 2(5), April–May 1948, p. 10-11.
- Skiff, J.V. "Indian Summer Vacations - Why Not?". New York State Conservationist, 3(1), August–September 1948, p. 23.
- Skiff, J.V. "Some Conservation Problems for the New Year". New York State Conservationist, 3(3) December–January 1948–49, p. 18-19.
- Skiff, V. "The Care and Feeding of Fishermen" Pennsylvania Angler, 18(1), January 1949, p. 14-15.
- Skiff, J.V.; Weeks, D.H.; Stone, U.B. "Lake Ontario". New York State Conservationist, 4(4), February–March 1950, p. 7-10.
- Skiff, J.V. "Hands Across Lake Champlain". New York State Conservationist, 4(6), June–July 1950, p. 25.
- Skiff, J.V. "The Care and Feeding of Hunters". New York State Conservationist, 5(2), October–November 1950, p. 6-7.
- Skiff, J.V. "How Does the Present Management Policy, as Prescribed by the Constitution, Contribute to the Economic Needs of State and Nation?" New York State Conservationist, 6(3), December–January 1951–52, p. 7.
- Skiff, J.V. "Close the Woods! Open the Woods!". New York State Conservationist, 8(3), December–January 1953–54, p. 18-19.

=== Book sections/chapters ===
- Skiff, J.V. "Grouse Dogs". section in The Ruffed Grouse. New York State Conservation Department. 1947, p. 395-400

=== Books ===
- Hopkins, A.S.; Skiff, J.V. Elementary Conservation of Soil, Water, Forests, Wildlife & Minerals, Conservation Series, Vol 2, NYS Conservation Department, 1941.

== J. Victor Skiff in the news ==
- "Think Foxes May be to Blame for Scarcity of Birds". Oswego Palladium Times, February 12, 1937, p. 16.
- "Wayne Sportsmen Plan Federation". Rochester Democrat and Chronicle, March 3, 1937, p13.

=== Superintendent of Inland Fisheries (July 6, 1938 – 1943) ===
- "Tip-Up Fishing Restricted". The Morning Herald, Gloversville and Johnston, NY, December 3, 1940
- "Chenango County Prominent in Conservation". The Brookfield Courier, March 5, 1941

=== Deputy Commissioner of Conservation (February 1, 1944 – December 31, 1944) ===
- "Best Hunting Awaits End of War". The Troy Record, February 17, 1944
- "Saving Soil Called Key to Conservation Problems by Skiff" Syracuse Herald Journal, April 20, 1944.
- "Food For Pheasants Available". Geneva Daily Times, January 29, 1945.

=== Acting Commissioner (January 1, 1945 – April 10, 1945) ===
- "Conservation Officials Would Ban Antlerless Deer Season This Year". Corning, N.Y. Leader, February 5, 1945, p. 2.
- "Deep Snowfall and Cold Severe On Game Population and Fish". Dansville Breeze, February 7, 1945
- "State Conservation Head Recommends Bill on Deer Season". Dansville Breeze, Dansville, N.Y., February 7, 1945.
- "Open Doe Season Believed Undesirable By Conservation Dept.". The Randolph (N.Y.) Register, February 9, 1945, p. 7.
- "18,930 Deer Taken Last Season". The Portville Review, Portville, Cattaraugus County, New York, February 15, 1945.
- "Commission Claims Dogs Killing off the Deer". St Lawrence Plaindealer, Canton, NY, March 6, 1945
- "Few Deer Die of Starvation; More Killed by Wild Dogs". Corning, N.Y. Leader, March 6, 1945, p. 8.
- "Post-War Conservation Plans on Right Track Says State Commissioner". Geneva Daily Times, March 6, 1945.
- "Outdoor Living Room Wanted By Service Men After War Reports New York Conservation Director". Dansville Breeze, Dansville, NY, March 7, 1945
- "Trout Season Expected to be Largest In 20 Years". Corning, N.Y. Leader, April 4, 1945.
- "Trout Season Opens April 7, But Not Here". The Morning Herald, Gloversville and Johnston, NY, April 5, 1945.

=== Deputy Commissioner of Conservation (April 11, 1945 – 1953) ===
- "Trout Season To End Sept. 9, Skiff Announces". Geneva Daily Times, August 24, 1945.
- "State Plans to Expand Forestation". Syracuse Herald Journal, December 12, 1945, p. 9
- "Reforesting Program Will Be Resumed". Geneva Daily Times, December 13, 1945, p. 15.
- "State Property Being Readied for Vacationers". Genesee Country Express and Advertiser, March 14, 1946, p. 9.
- "Hunters Asked To Return Bands Of Marked Ducks". Dansville Breeze, Dansville N.Y., November 19, 1946.
- "Deputy Threw Back Big Fish". Civil Service Leader, August 6, 1946, p. 5
- "May Make Arrests in Field". Genesee Country Express and Advertiser, December 26, 1946
- "Injun Summer Comin'". Dansville Breeze, October 5, 1948, p. 2
- "Ask Proposal to Avoid License for Farmer". Marcellus Observer, August 12, 1949
- "Bill Would Allow Farmers to Shoot Foxes Without Permit". Mount Morris Enterprise, August 17, 1949, p. 11.
- "Conservationists Visit Pack Forest". The Warrensburg News, September 1, 1949, p. 8
- "Officials Inspect Blow-Down Areas". The Warrensburg News, July 5, 1951.
- "Cold War on Public Service Must Be Met With Strong Offensive, Skiff Advises". Civil Service Leader, Vol. XIII, No. 20, February 5, 1952.
- "Conservation Dept. Hears Club Problems". The Chatham Courier, April 24, 1952
- "300 Attend Whitestown Republican Club Dinner". Utica Daily Press, April 28, 1953, p. 9.
- "Fishing Contest Winners Announced By Louis A. Wehle". The Lyons Republican and Clyde Times, Lyons, N.Y., January 7, 1954.

=== GOP Legislative Consultant (1954-1958) ===
- "Team of Experts Now Permanent Plan of G.O.P. Legislators". Civil Service Leader, February 22, 1955, p. 2

=== Deputy Commissioner of Conservation (1959-1964) ===
- "We Are Disappointed". The Warrensburg News, January 22, 1959, p. 2.
- "Conservation Council to Meet". The Warrensburg News, May 14, 1959, p. 6
- "'Fish-For-Fun' Program Slated". The Palladium Times, April 14, 1961.
- "Forester's Office Will Remain in Northville: Skiff". The Leader Herald, Gloversville Johnston, NY, June 8, 1961.
- "Republicans Gather to Meet Candidates". The Geneva Times, October 25, 1963, p. 9.
- "Hunting. Fishing. Wildlife". The Palladium Times, January 18, 1964, p. 9

=== Obituaries (1964) ===
- "Victor Skiff, Conservation Officer, Dies". Amsterdam Evening Record, September 15, 1964
- Cheatum, E.L. "J. Victor Skiff, 1908-1964". The Journal of Wildlife Management, 29(1), 1965, p. 232-233.
