= Gainesville, New York =

Gainesville
- Town
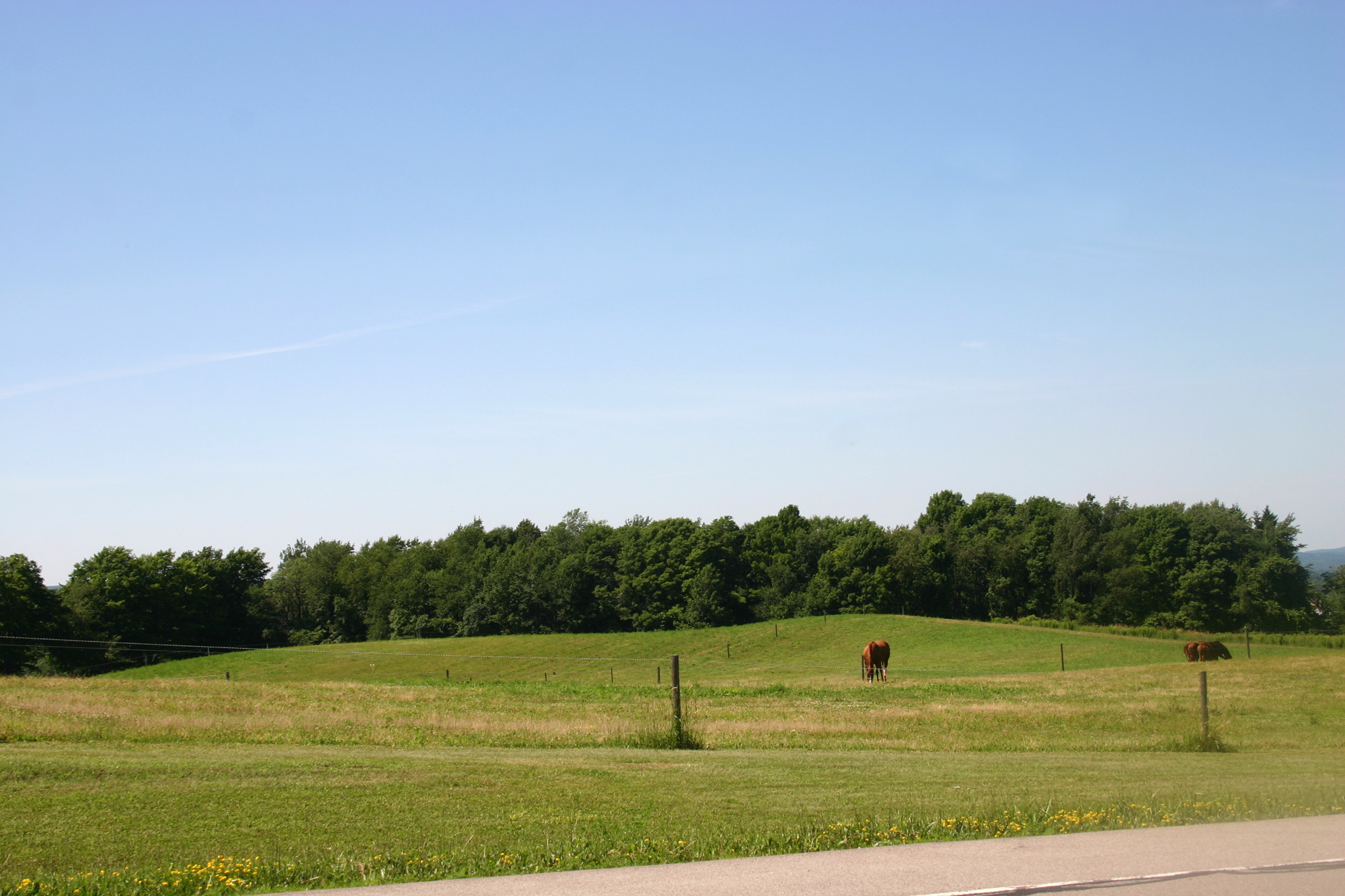
- The ice age left rolling, but fertile land

- Location within Wyoming County and New York
- Coordinates: 42.641°N 78.134°W
- Country: United States
- State: New York
- County: Wyoming

Area
  - Total: 35.71 sq mi (92.48 km^{2})
  - Land: 35.57 sq mi (92.13 km^{2})
  - Water: 0.14 sq mi (0.36 km^{2})
- Elevation: 1,660 ft (510 m)

Population (2010)
  - Total: 2,182
  - Estimate (2016): 2,118
  - Density: 59.5/sq mi (22.99/km^{2})
- Time zone: UTC-5 (Eastern (EST))
  - Summer (DST): UTC-4 (EDT)
- FIPS code: 36-27980
- GNIS feature ID: 978982

Gainesville is an incorporated town in Wyoming County, New York. The population was 2,333 at the 2000 census. The town is named after General Edmund P. Gaines.

The Town of Gainesville is on the eastern border of the county. Gainesville is also the name of a village in the town.

== History ==
The Town of Gainesville was established in 1814 from part of the Town of Warsaw. The original name was "Hebe." The Town of Gainesville is the birthplace of David Starr Jordan, the first president of Stanford University; as well as Ella Hawley Crossett, prominent activist in the women's suffrage movement.

== Geography ==
According to the United States Census Bureau, the town has a total area of 35.7 square miles (92.5 km^{2}), of which 35.6 square miles (92.2 km^{2}) is land and 0.1 square mile (0.3 km^{2}) (0.31%) is water.

This rural area has traditionally been one of dairy farms and forests. The soils are deep and fertile, though somewhat rolling and rocky, as they were left by the last continental ice sheet.

== Demographics ==
Historical population
Census	Pop.	Note	%±
1830	1,820		—
1840	2,367		30.1%
1850	1,760		−25.6%
1860	1,732		−1.6%
1870	1,612		−6.9%
1880	1,787		10.9%
1890	2,166		21.2%
1900	2,325		7.3%
1910	2,690		15.7%
1920	2,276		−15.4%
1930	2,074		−8.9%
1940	1,923		−7.3%
1950	2,121		10.3%
1960	2,032		−4.2%
1970	2,177		7.1%
1980	2,133		−2.0%
1990	2,288		7.3%
2000	2,333		2.0%
2010	2,182		−6.5%
2016 (est.)	2,118	▼	−2.9%
U.S. Decennial Census

As of the census of 2000, there were 2,333 people, 873 households, and 644 families residing in the town. The population density was 65.5 inhabitants per square mile (25.3/km^{2}). There were 945 housing units at an average density of 26.5 per square mile (10.2/km^{2}). The racial makeup of the town was 98.46% White, 0.13% Black or African American, 0.30% Native American, 0.21% Asian, 0.17% Pacific Islander, 0.13% from other races, and 0.60% from two or more races. Hispanic or Latino of any race were 0.81% of the population.

There were 873 households, out of which 37.0% had children under the age of 18 living with them, 58.4% were married couples living together, 9.6% had a female householder with no husband present, and 26.2% were non-families. 21.1% of all households were made up of individuals, and 9.5% had someone living alone who was 65 years of age or older. The average household size was 2.67 and the average family size was 3.07.

In the town, the population was spread out, with 27.3% under the age of 18, 6.4% from 18 to 24, 30.1% from 25 to 44, 24.6% from 45 to 64, and 11.7% who were 65 years of age or older. The median age was 37 years. For every 100 females, there were 99.4 males. For every 100 females age 18 and over, there were 96.2 males.

The median income for a household in the town was $37,188, and the median income for a family was $40,833. Males had a median income of $32,262 versus $22,016 for females. The per capita income for the town was $15,139. About 5.2% of families and 8.0% of the population were below the poverty line, including 8.3% of those under age 18 and 8.8% of those age 65 or over.

== Communities and locations in the Town of Gainesville ==
- Gainesville – The Village of Gainesville.
- Gainesville Center – A location west of Gainesville village on Route 78.
- Hardy's – A location in the southwest corner of the town.
- Newburg – A hamlet on Route 19 near the northern town line.
- North Gainesville – A location west of Newburg.
- Rock Glen – A hamlet on Route 19 near the northern town line.
- Silver Springs – The Village of Silver Springs.
