= Baptismal regeneration =

Doctrines held by major Christian denominations

Baptismal regeneration is the name given to doctrines which maintain that salvation is intimately linked to the act of baptism, without necessarily holding that salvation is impossible apart from it. Baptismal regeneration is held by the Roman Catholic, Lutheran, Eastern Orthodox and Oriental Orthodox traditions, among others, such as certain Anglicans. Etymologically, the term means "being born again" (regeneration, or rebirth) "through baptism" (baptismal). Etymology concerns the origins and root meanings of words, but these "continually change their meaning, ... sometimes moving out of any recognisable contact with their origin ... It is nowadays generally agreed that current usage determines meaning." While for Reformed theologian Louis Berkhof, "regeneration" and "new birth" are synonymous, Herbert Lockyer treats the two terms as different in meaning in one publication, but in another states that baptism signifies regeneration. (Note: "Baptism is a figure of our union with the Lord by the work of the Spirit. The Supper is a figure of our communion with the same Lord through the work of His cross. The former signifies regeneration; the latter, redemption.")

The term is associated by some with John 3:1–21, where Jesus tells Nicodemus, a Pharisee and member of the Jewish ruling council, that "unless one is born again he cannot see the kingdom of God ... unless one is born of water and the Spirit, he cannot enter the kingdom of God".

Churches originating out of the Stone–Campbell Restoration Movement, mainly the nondenominational Churches of Christ, are also commonly believed to hold to this doctrine, though they dispute this to be the case. One author from the Churches of Christ describes the relationship between faith and baptism this way, "Faith is the reason why a person is a child of God; baptism is the time at which one is incorporated into Christ and so becomes a child of God" (italics are in the source).

== History ==
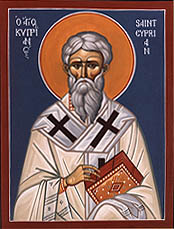
Cyprian advocated for baptismal regeneration.

=== Early Church ===
One of the earliest of the Church Fathers to enunciate clearly and unambiguously the doctrine of baptismal regeneration ("the idea that salvation happens at and by water baptism duly administered") was Cyprian (c. 200 – 258): "While he attributed all the saving energy to the grace of God, he considered the 'laver of saving water' the instrument of God that makes a person 'born again,' receiving a new life and putting off the self-centred life that he had previously lived. The 'water of new birth' animated him to new life by the Spirit of holiness working in his spirit through it."

Clement of Rome, Ignatius of Antioch and Polycarp are silent on the issue, however the Epistle of Barnabas, the Shepherd of Hermas, Theophilus, Justin Martyr, Clement of Alexandria, and Tertullian, among others connected following Christ in baptism with salvation. Baptismal regeneration was also affirmed by Origen and Augustine of Hippo.

Later, according to Augustine, Pelagius denied that infant baptism forgives sins. Caelestius, who was a disciple of Pelagius, denied the necessity of infant baptism for an infant's salvation, as infants were not yet sinners.

Some have argued that the Jovinianists and Paulicians did not believe in baptismal regeneration. The Messalians believed that Baptism was only optional.

Gavin Ortlund has argued that regenerative language used by some early Church Fathers does not necessarily imply a causative relationship involving the act of baptism itself, stating: "the sign and the thing signified often stand in one for the other". He cites Cyril of Jerusalem as seeing Cornelius being saved at the moment of faith, yet connecting baptism as regenerative for him, without being causative. However Ortlund's arguments were disputed by Trent Horn, who argued that Ortlund's view of attitudes among the early fathers is a minority view among even Protestant scholars.

=== Medieval ===
Thomas Aquinas believed in the necessity of baptism.

Petr Chelčický held that baptism by itself could not save, but was a part of the larger process of salvation, which included instruction, confirmation, and discipleship. Renerius Saccho, writing against the Waldensians, stated that the Waldensians believed that the "ablution which is given to infants profits nothing".

=== Reformation ===
Among the Protestant Reformers, baptismal regeneration was denied by Huldrych Zwingli, but was affirmed by Martin Luther. All Anabaptist writers deny baptismal regeneration for infants on the grounds that they are unable to sin or repent; Acts 2:38 has Peter commanding baptism, alongside a reference to repentance, "for the forgiveness of your sins" ("And Peter said to them, 'Repent and be baptized every one of you in the name of Jesus Christ for the forgiveness of your sins, and you will receive the gift of the Holy Spirit.'"). Most Anabaptists, however, do believe in baptismal regeneration for a truly repentant sinner who is old enough to understand what sin is, and who requests baptism for himself.

== Major denominations ==
=== Roman Catholicism ===
Section 1215 of the Catechism of the Catholic Church states: "This sacrament [baptism] is also called 'the washing of regeneration and renewal by the Holy Spirit,' for it signifies and actually brings about the birth of water and the Spirit without which no one 'can enter the kingdom of God.' (Titus 3:5)

Quoting the Decree on the Church's Missionary Activity, Christopher J. Walsh comments that the Second Vatican Council reaffirms the traditional understanding of Christian initiation as a unity and a process: "It is not something achieved with a trickle of water one Sunday afternoon, but a progressive entry into a commitment and a relationship [...] Becoming a Christian is a conversion a growing adherence to Christ in faith and sacrament over an extended period of time" (see also Catechism of the Catholic Church, 1229–31).

Against this background the more detailed doctrine of the Roman Catholic Church can be summed up in the following statements from that catechism:

1. While in John 3:5 Jesus himself affirms that baptism is necessary for salvation, and no one should refuse to be baptized, the effects of sacramental baptism are brought about also by "baptism of blood" (dying for the sake of the faith) and "baptism of desire", whether explicit, as in the case of catechumens, or implicit, as in the case of anyone who is ignorant of the Gospel of Christ and of his Church, but seeks the truth and does the will of God in accordance with his understanding of it,
2. As regards children who die without baptism, the Church entrusts them to the mercy of God.
3. In Roman Catholic teaching, baptism, like all the sacraments, presupposes faith and by words and objects also nourishes, strengthens, and expresses it.
4. Baptism is the sacrament of faith (cf. Mark 16:16). But faith needs the community of believers. It is only within the faith of the Church that each of the faithful can believe. The faith required for Baptism is not a perfect and mature faith, but a beginning that is called to develop.

The early church fathers offered differing explanations for the salvation of the thief who was crucified with Jesus, and who was not reported to have undergone water baptism. Cyprian of Carthage theorized that the thief was baptized in his own blood as a martyr, an opinion shared by Jerome, while Augustine said that "the thief received the baptism of substitution ... through the faith and conversion of the heart, taking into account that circumstances made it impossible for him to celebrate the sacrament".

Augustine's explanation of this episode corresponds to the Roman Catholic Church teaching of the existence of baptism by desire for those who would partake of the Sacrament if they could and experience a perfect desire to do all that pertains to salvation, but are prevented from receiving baptism by circumstances beyond their control, while Cyprian's corresponds to the same Church's teaching on baptism of blood for martyrs.

=== Eastern Orthodoxy ===
The following claims are made on websites associated with Orthodox Churches:

1. Orthodoxy (and it is only fair to add, also the Roman Catholics and Anglo-Catholics) has always held to baptismal regeneration. In other words, that spiritual life begins with baptism.
2. The Bible's "sacramental theology" states that there is [a need for the taint of sin to be removed] since "...through one man sin entered the world, and death through sin, and so death spread to all men." (Romans 5:12) For this reason, "...there are none righteous, not even one" (i.e. not infants). (Romans 3:10) How are these young ones saved from the sin they have received from Adam's race? They are saved through the regenerative power of baptism and the faith of the Church (i.e. the Christian faithful) [here Titus 3:5; Acts 2:38; John 3:5 & 1 Peter 3:20, 21 are quoted] Baptism is not just a symbolic testimony of what God has done in the heart of an adult believer, but is in itself a dynamic means of actually effecting the power of the Gospel (the death and resurrection of Jesus Christ) in a life (Romans 6:4). Christian baptism is the means whereby we encounter and identify with Jesus Christ Himself Greek Orthodox Archdiocese of America

=== Oriental Orthodoxy ===
If infants can receive the blessings of laying of hands by the Lord, they can also receive baptismal grace of regeneration. The theology behind this is that grace precedes faith (Eph. 2: 8) and prevenial grace is a reality. The initiative is from God always. If God takes the first step in dying for us, He also takes the first step in saving through the free gift of regeneration without the precondition of faith. The Syrian Orthodox Church in North America

=== Lutheranism ===
Martin Luther elaborated the regeneration and the saving power in Baptism:

It is not the water that does them, indeed, but the Word of God which is in and with the water, and faith which trusts this Word of God in the water...

Lutheranism affirms baptismal regeneration, believing that baptism is a means of grace, instead of human works, through which God creates and strengthens faith.

Lutherans believe that the Bible shows how Christians are connected through baptism with Christ and the new life Christ's work gives us. The Bible's author uses the picture of cleansing to show how baptism applies Jesus Christ's saving work to receivers. Lutherans believe that the Bible depicts the connection between faith, baptism and being clothed with Christ. The result of the connection is that Christians are children of God with all the rights, privileges and blessings that go with that status. Lutherans state that in his letter to Titus, Paul introduces the work of the Holy Spirit, again linking baptism, new life, and the blessings Jesus has won. Lutheran scholars concluded that in the Scripture:

we see that baptism is not a mere symbol of what God does for us. It is not just a ceremony done to connect someone outwardly to a church. God is at work through baptism. He is connecting us to Christ's death and resurrection. All of his mercy and grace are directed at the person being baptized. The Holy Spirit is giving the new life of faith in Jesus. The results are amazing: buried and raised with Christ; clothed with Christ; washed clean of sin; a forgiven, believing child of God; an heir of eternal life.

— Otto 2010, p. 12

The Lutheran Small Catechism states that baptism "works forgiveness of sins, delivers from death and the devil, and gives eternal salvation to all who believe this, as the words and promises of God declare." Luther, in his Large Catechism (XIII), also wrote the following: "Moreover, that it is most solemnly and strictly commanded that we must be baptized or we cannot be saved". According to a Lutheran writer, "[i]t is in the context of writing against people who believed that 'Baptism is an external thing, and that external things are no benefit'...Luther's point was that since the Lord instituted baptism (Matthew 28:19) and spoke of its importance (Mark 16:16), then we are to do as he says and baptize, knowing that the Holy Spirit works through baptism to change people's hearts. So, baptism is necessary in the sense that the Lord commands us to administer baptism: it is not for us to decide whether or not we are going to do what the Lord says." Twentieth-century Lutheran theologian Edmund Schlink, citing Titus 3:5, comments: "In this act of salvation all human activity is expressly excluded. It is done entirely by God's deed, by the one act of the washing and the activity of the Spirit through which regeneration and renewal take place." The Lutheran Churches teach that "we are cleansed of our sins and born again and renewed in Holy Baptism by the Holy Ghost. But she also teaches that whoever is baptized must, through daily contrition and repentance, drown The Old Adam so that daily a new man come forth and arise who walks before God in righteousness and purity forever. She teaches that whoever lives in sins after his baptism has again lost the grace of baptism."

Article 251 of Luther's Small Catechism and other Lutheran teachings, however, also recognize that baptism is not absolutely necessary: Lutherans agree that one can be saved without baptism, and a baptized Christian can lose salvation if he later falls from faith.

=== Reformed tradition ===
The Reformed confessions consistently teach a conjunction between baptism and regeneration. The confessions teach that baptism is an external sign of an inward reality (regeneration and cleansing from sin), and that baptism actually confers the inward reality which it signifies. This viewpoint is distinct from the traditional definition of baptismal regeneration in that the power of baptism resides in the Holy Spirit rather than the act of baptism itself. Further, the application of the grace conferred in baptism is not tied to the time at which it is administered. The promise offered in baptism is conditional on faith and repentance, which may occur at a time later than the act of baptism.

The British Congregationalist New Testament scholar and theologian H. T. Andrews, after an examination of five texts (1 Cor. 6:11, 1 Cor. 15:29, Eph. 4:5 and 5:26, Titus 3:5), concluded: "In the light of these statements it is difficult to believe that the more neutral phrases, e.g. 'baptized into Christ,' 'baptized into one body,' imply a merely symbolical interpretation of baptism. With this evidence before us it seems very hard to resist the conclusion (however little we may like it) that if the Epistles do not enunciate the ecclesiastical doctrine of baptismal regeneration, they at any rate approximate very closely to it." The twentieth-century Scottish theologian D. M. Baillie has remarked that "[I]n New Testament thought baptism was closely connected with the death and resurrection of Christ. It stood for the great spiritual event in which a man, united by faith with the death and resurrection of Christ, dies to himself and the world and rises to newness of life, puts off the old man with his deeds and puts on the new man."

=== Anglicanism ===
In 1549 Thomas Cranmer wrote in the first prayer book, after the baptism by immersion, or by pouring if the child was too weak for immersion; "Almighty God the father of our lord Jesus Christ, who hath regenerate thee by water and the holy ghost, and hath given unto thee remission of all thy sins: he vouchsafe to anoint thee with the unction of his holy spirit, and bring thee to the inheritance of everlasting life. Amen."

And furthermore; "Take this white vesture for a token of the innocence, which by Gods grace in this holy sacrament of Baptism, is given unto thee: and for a sign whereby thou art admonished, so long as thou livest, to give thyself to innocence of living, that, after this transitory life, thou mayest be partaker of the life everlasting. Amen."

In the 1552 Book of Common Prayer, an invitation to the congregation was inserted to give thanks to God that the newly baptized are "regenerate and grafted into the body of Christ's congregation" which remains in the 1662 Book of Common Prayer.

There were at least three periods in the history of English Anglicanism when the doctrine was disputed. In the seventeenth century, the puritans objected strongly (it was mentioned specifically at the Savoy Conference in 1660); the subject come to the fore again in 1810 and after the rise of the Tractarian Movement it was again hotly debated and gave rise to the celebrated Gorham Case, wherein the Church of England decided in favor of Baptismal Regeneration, but the secular court overruled them.

==== Differing Anglican attitudes ====
In his summary of the situation from 1810 onwards, Nockles detects at least seven different strands of thought on the subject:

1. The extreme high church view: This insisted that the spiritual effects of baptism were inseparable from it even to the point of an opus operatum or purely mechanical understanding of the rite and this was the only acceptable doctrine of the Church of England.
2. The moderate high church: While holding a high view of Baptismal Regeneration themselves, they recognized diversity of opinion must arise but held that the Liturgy provided a corrective.
3. Calvinist evangelicals: These accepted a rigorous doctrine of predestination, and with it that of antecedent grace, and therefore denied baptismal regeneration outright as unscriptural.
4. The majority of evangelicals: For them baptism was little more than initiation into the visible Church.
5. Some of the former: The "little more" included the recognition of baptism at least as a sign of regeneration as stated by Article 27 of the Thirty-Nine Articles
6. The moderate evangelicals: These, and John Bird Sumner, archbishop of Canterbury (1848–62) was one, accepted what was, from the High church perspective, a modified version of the doctrine in which the spiritual effects are not inseparably tied to the rite. While holding this position, Sumner was not prepared to label Gorham's Calvinistic arguments heretical and insisted that Elizabethan divines (theologians) had allowed that the grace of spiritual regeneration could be separated from the sacrament of Baptism.
7. A high church Anglican position: Formulated in the first instance by James Mozley as he moved away from Tractarianism and investigated the opinions of early generations of high church theologians on baptismal regeneration as Sumner had done. He discovered "statements made sometimes, which, if put into easy English and placed before our [High church] friends, would be set down as heresy, but which occur in undoubtedly orthodox authorities"

==== Fundamental theological issue ====
Low Church/Evangelical Anglican, William Griffith Thomas summed it up as follows: "Articles XXV, XXVI, XXVII are all clearly against the opus operatum [i.e. the invariable spiritual regeneration of every baptized infant (ed)] and yet the Baptismal Service has, "Seeing now that this child is regenerate"; and the Catechism also speaks of, "My Baptism wherein I was made a member of Christ", etc. How are these to be reconciled? The question largely turns on the interpretation of the word "Regeneration", and differences of opinion are largely due to its ambiguity." The High churchmen took their stand on the fact that "the liturgy declared the infant to be regenerate"; the Evangelical knew this "and wrote books to prove that he might use the service with a good conscience, interpreting the liturgy in a charitable sense" Bishop Moule spoke for this second group when he wrote:"In the sense of title and position, he [the newly baptized] is at once regenerate. He receives the right and pledge and entitlement to covenant blessing. But the infant who in sacramental title is regenerate needs in heart and spirit to be inwardly and really born again." The bishop then widens the scope of his argument appealing to sacramental theology in general by quoting Archbishop Cranmer, Archbishop Ussher and Richard Hooker who in different ways state that the outward application a sacrament does not necessarily communicate the grace of the thing signified. Another evangelical Anglican theologian Geoffrey W. Bromiley, has written, "Baptism as identification with Christ is the sacrament of the regenerative work of the Holy Spirit, not of my consciousness and confession of faith. It is the sign of faith only as this is itself the work of the primary and sovereign divine operation."

Old High Church/Center Church Harold Browne wrote on the topic as follows:

We cannot doubt of the truth of God's promises. Hence we may be assured, that He will make good His covenant to all that are brought within the terms of it: i. e. to all who are baptized. Hence again, we infer that the promises to the baptized, and therefore the blessings of baptism, are: —

(1.) Pardon of sins. (2.) The aid of the Spirit of God. (3.) If not forfeited, everlasting life.

Now this fact, that baptism, from the very nature of the covenant, carries with it an assurance of pardon for sins, of adoption into the Church, and of aid from the Spirit, is sufficient to warrant the term, "Baptismal Regeneration." Birth into the Church and adoption into the family of God, remission of original sins in infants, and of all past sins in worthily receiving adults, and the gift of the Spirit to renew and sanctify, comprise the elements of the new birth, the germ of spiritual life. Hence they are called by the Church "Spiritual Regeneration." Yet, as God's gifts of grace are not compulsory, it follows that the baptized, by his own perverseness, may reject them all.

In the 20th century, Anglo-Catholic theologian E.L. Mascall expressed the view that "[T]he entry upon the supernatural realm which is bestowed by incorporation into Christ and which is fittingly described as a new birth is also a deliverance from the realm of fallen human nature - the sphere in which man lies under the curse of original sin - and an insertion into the realm of the perfect manhood of Christ. Mascall explains that "The grace of incorporation into Christ, the normal channel of which is baptism, is a supernatural fact in the ontological order which does not of itself immediately produce physical and moral effects; but it does produce such effects mediately and progressively when, and to the degree in which, the soul co-operates with this grace and surrenders itself to its influence." The work of the Holy Spirit in Baptism has been emphasized by several theologians. Richard A. Norris has said that "Forgiveness of sins and incorporation into Christ ... are only made possible for people by the action of the Holy Spirit. It is the Spirit who ... is God working within people to connect them with Christ and thus to set them in their proper relation with the Father. Baptism, consequently, has always been understood as a sacrament which signifies the gift of the Holy Spirit. And Anglican theologian and bishop Hugh Montefiore says that "Baptism is efficacious if it is asked for in faith, in the sense that it enacts sacramentally what has been begun spiritually, and the very fact that it is an outward and visible sign both strengthens the faith of the baptized and is a public witness to that faith."

=== Methodism ===
The Methodist understanding of Holy Baptism is a "Wesleyan blend of sacramental and evangelical aspects." The Methodist Articles of Religion in Article XVII — Of Baptism, therefore states that "Baptism is not only a sign of profession and mark of difference whereby Christians are distinguished from others that are not baptized; but it is also a sign of regeneration or the new birth. The Baptism of young children is to be retained in the Church."

John Wesley, the founder of Methodism, taught that:

In baptism a child was cleansed of the guilt of original sin, initiated into the covenant with God, admitted into the church, made an heir of the divine kingdom, and spiritually born anew. He said that while baptism was neither essential to nor sufficient for salvation, it was the "ordinary means" that God designated for applying the benefits of the work of Christ in human lives. On the other hand, although he affirmed the regenerating grace of infant baptism, he also insisted upon the necessity of adult conversion for those who have fallen from grace. A person who matures into moral accountability must respond to God's grace in repentance and faith. Without personal decision and commitment to Christ, the baptismal gift is rendered ineffective. Baptism for Wesley, therefore, was a part of the lifelong process of salvation. He saw spiritual rebirth as a twofold experience in the normal process of Christian development—to be received through baptism in infancy and through commitment to Christ later in life. Salvation included both God's initiating activity of grace and a willing human response.

— United Methodist Church 2008

While baptism imparts grace, Methodists teach that a personal acceptance of Jesus Christ (the first work of grace) is essential to salvation. During the second work of grace, entire sanctification, a believer is purified of original sin and made holy.

=== Baptists ===
The Baptist confessions of faith and theologians teaches a link between the outward sign of washing with water and the inward grace or spiritual effect, similarly to the Reformed tradition. The Baptist theologian Thomas Helwys stated in A Short Declaration of the Mistery of Iniquity:

the Baptism of Christ is the Baptism of amendement of life, for the remission of sins. Mark. 1.4. And our Saviour Christ saith: Except a man bee borne off water and off the Spirit, he cannot enter into the Kingdome of God. Iohn. 3. and Heb. 10.22. Let vs draw neare with a true hart in assurance of faith, our harts being pure from an evill conscience, and washed in our bodies with pure water. Here is the true Baptisme set downe, which is the Baptisme off amendement off life for the remis∣sion off sinnes: And here is the true matter where with men must bee washed, which is water, and the Holie Ghost, that is pure from an evill conscience, and washed with water: Therefore can you not devide the water, and the spirit in this Baptisme, Christ hath ioyned them together, and he that denies washing, or is not washed with the spirit is not bap∣tized, and hee that denies washing, or is not wa∣shed with water, is not Baptized, because wee see the Baptisme of Christ, is to bee washed with water and the Holie Ghost.

And furthermore:

if you followe not Christ in the regeneration, that is, if you bee not borne againe of water & of the Spirit, & so enter in∣to the Kingdome off Heaven, all is nothinge, as you see by the example of this Ruler. And Cornelius (Acts 10) If he had not bene baptized with the holy ghost and with Water, for all his praiers and almes he had not, nor could not have entred into the Kingdome off Heaven.

The Orthodox Creed states that Baptism is a sign of the entrance into the Covenant of Grace and the visible Church, the remission of sins in the Blood of Christ, the union with him in his death and resurrection, and the newness of life. Its writer, Thomas Monck, the General Baptist theologian, rejected the separation of the sign and signification of the sacraments and compared it to Nestorianism.

== Other groups ==
Gregory A. Boyd says that Oneness Pentecostals teach what he calls baptismal regeneration. The publication Vantage Point attributes what it calls baptismal regeneration to "Roman Catholicism, Seventh-day Adventism, Mormonism, United Pentecostalism (and other Oneness churches), most Churches of Christ and Eastern Orthodoxy".

=== Latter-day Saint (Mormon) ===
Members of the Church of Jesus Christ of Latter-day Saints (LDS Church) believe in baptismal regeneration. Baptism is understood as the means by which people enter the Body of Christ and receive a remission of their sins. Through baptism people enter a covenant by which they promise to come into the fold of God, to take upon themselves the name of Christ, to stand as a witness for God, to keep his commandments, and to bear one another's burdens, manifesting a determination to serve him to the end, and to prepare to receive the spirit of Christ for the remission of sins. The Lord, as his part of the covenant, is to pour out his spirit upon them, redeem them from their sins, raise them in the first resurrection, and give them eternal life. Baptism is understood to represent the death of the old person and their rebirth as an adopted spiritual child of Christ. Baptism is considered necessary for salvation and exaltation. Baptism must be conducted by an ordained and authorized priesthood holder.

=== Churches of Christ viewpoint ===
Because of the belief that baptism is a necessary part of salvation, some hold that the Churches of Christ endorse the doctrine of baptismal regeneration. E. Calvin Beisner of the Evangelical Free Church of America made this claim in a debate with Jim R. Everett which appeared in a series of articles that appeared in The Preceptor beginning in May 1983 (Everett rejected Beisner's claim).

However, members of the Churches of Christ reject this, arguing that since faith and repentance are necessary, and that the cleansing of sins is by the blood of Christ through the grace of God, baptism is not an inherently redeeming ritual. Rather, their inclination is to point to the biblical passage in which Peter, analogizing baptism to Noah's flood, posits that "likewise baptism doth also now save us" but parenthetically clarifies that baptism is "not the putting away of the filth of the flesh but the response of a good conscience toward God" (1 Peter 3:21). One author from the Churches of Christ describes the relationship between faith and baptism this way, "Faith is the reason why a person is a child of God; baptism is the time at which one is incorporated into Christ and so becomes a child of God" (italics are in the source). Baptism is understood as a confessional expression of faith and repentance rather than a "work" that earns salvation. Douglas A. Foster denies this contention regarding the Restoration Movement as a whole, (Note: "If by baptismal regeneration the accusers mean that the act of immersion inherently regenerates or converts or saves a person, then the charge is not true. From the earliest days of the Stone-Campbell Movement, the teaching has been that the only proper subjects for baptism are those who have faith in Jesus Christ as the Son of God and who repent of their past sins. It is the blood of Jesus that cleanses people from all sin by his grace. Baptism is not a ritual act that has inherent redeeming power. It is not true that when people "get baptized," they are automatically 'born again'.") a contention denied also by other representatives of the movement.

== Criticisms ==
Critics of the doctrine frequently allege that it tends to emphasize external form (including the role of water) rather than internal belief (Acts 16:31, Rom. 10:9).

Some Protestants claim that baptismal regeneration is not clearly taught in Scripture and thus contradicts their fundamental belief that all things necessary for salvation are taught in the Bible clearly enough for the ordinary believer to find them there (Clarity of scripture; also see sola fide). Evangelical, Fundamentalist, and Pentecostal Christians emphasize the need for a conversion experience that involves a personal encounter of the individual with the power of God. Generally, these denominations teach that those without such a conversion experience are not "saved" and therefore are not true Christians. These groups frequently refer to personal salvation through such an experience as being "born again." However, those who believe they were "born again" at a young age often do not have a conversion experience, but find confidence in their salvation by showing the fruits of the spirit (Gal. 5:22-23).

== See also ==
- Baptism
- Means of grace
