= Damnationism =

Damnationism (damnation+-ism) may refer to:

- Special salvation, or the opposite of general salvation
  - Extra Ecclesiam nulla salus
    - Feeneyism
- Annihilationism
