= St. Benedict Abbey (Massachusetts) =

Benedictine monastery for men located in Harvard, Massachusetts

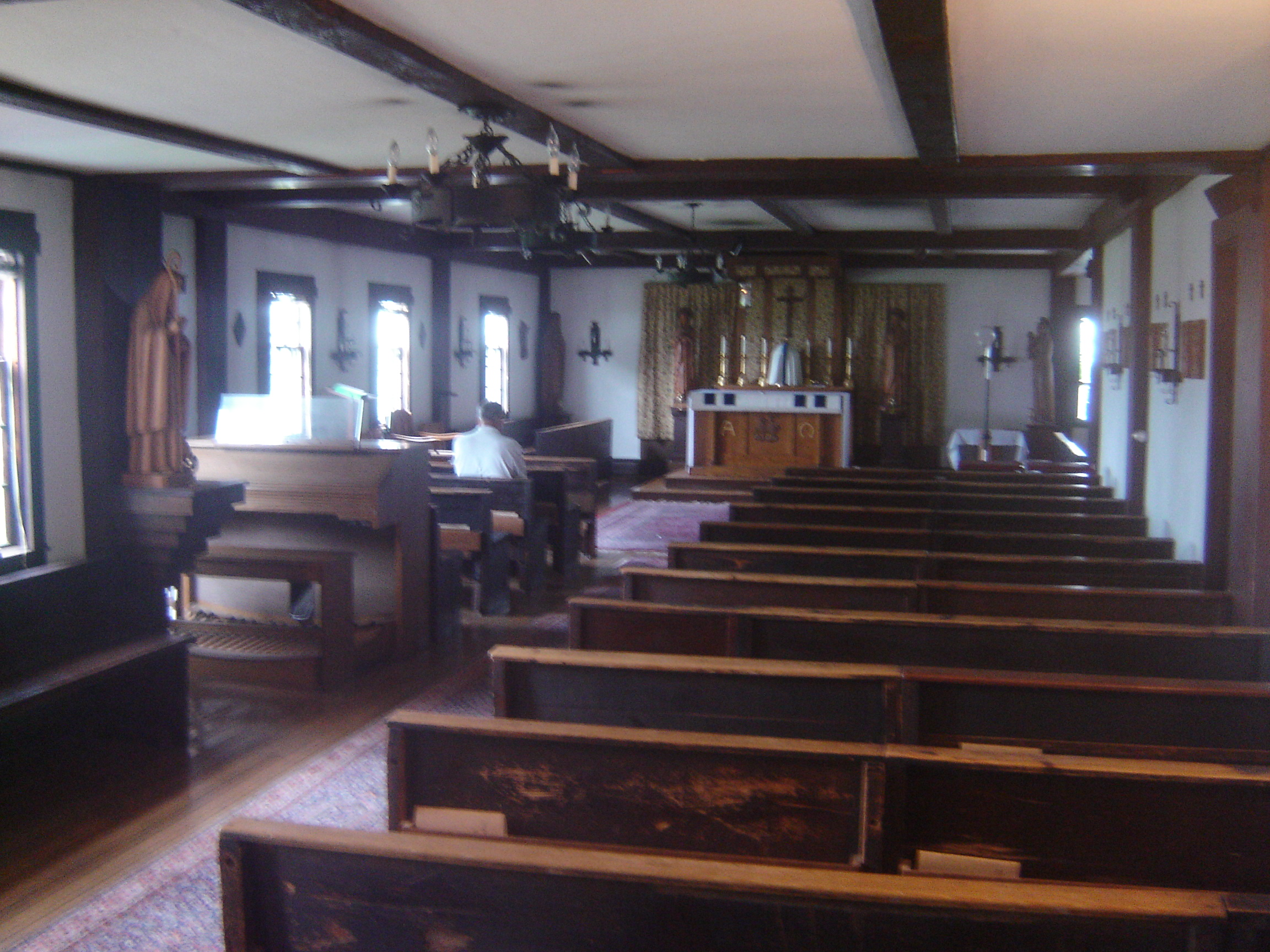
- Chapel dedicated to St. Therese of Liseux

- Location within Massachusetts

Monastery information
- Order: Benedictines
- Diocese: Worcester

People
- Founders: Catherine Goddard Clarke; Avery Dulles; Christopher Huntington
- Abbot: The Rt. Rev. Marc Crilly, O.S.B.

Site
- Location: Still River, Massachusetts
- Coordinates: 42°29′12.1″N 71°37′16.0″W
- Website: www.abbey.org

St. Benedict Abbey is a Benedictine monastery in the village of Still River in Harvard, Massachusetts. Its members are known for praying the Divine Office and Mass in Latin.

== History ==
Its predecessor, the St. Benedict Center began in 1941 as a student center in an old furniture store in Harvard Square on the corner of Bow and Arrow Streets, just a half-block from the Harvard Yard in Cambridge. It was directly across the street from the Romanesque front porch of St. Paul's, Cambridge's renowned "university church".

The three original founders were Catherine Goddard Clarke, Avery Dulles (then a Harvard Law student), and Christopher Huntington, a Harvard dean. Catherine Clarke went on to help found the Slaves of the Immaculate Heart of Mary, Avery Dulles entered the Jesuits and later became a cardinal, and Christopher Huntington became a priest in Long Island, New York.

Fr Leonard Feeney later became the head of the St. Benedict Center. The center was engaged in controversy with the Church over his interpretation of extra ecclesiam nulla salus ("outside the Church there is no salvation"), which led to a lack of clarity regarding the center's status in the Catholic Church. Under the direction of Feeney, Clarke and others organized into a religious community called the Slaves of the Immaculate Heart of Mary. In January 1958, the group moved from Cambridge to the town of Harvard. Differences in governance ultimately led to most of the brother monks becoming Benedictines and most of the sisters reorganizing as the Sisters of Saint Benedict Center, Slaves of the Immaculate Heart of Mary.

=== Canonical recognition ===
The brothers' community gained canonical recognition as a pious union in 1975, and as a Benedictine priory dependent on the Swiss-American Congregation in 1980. The priory became independent in 1990. In 1993, the priory became a full-fledged abbey and the monks elected the Gabriel Gibbs as their first abbot. St. Benedict Abbey follows the Benedictine Rule and is governed by the Benedictine Confederation.

== Abbots of St. Benedict Abbey ==
1. Right Reverend Gabriel Gibbs, OSB (1993–2010)
2. Right Reverend Xavier Connelly, OSB (2010–2021)
3. Right Reverend Marc Crilly, OSB (2021–present)

== See also ==
- Slaves of the Immaculate Heart of Mary
- Harvard, Massachusetts
- Still River, Massachusetts
