= Michael Müller (writer) =

Catholic priest and writer (1825–1899)

The Reverend Michael Müller C.Ss.R.
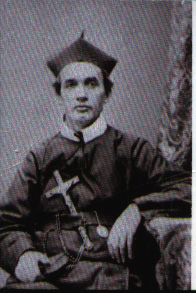

Personal details
- Born: 18 December 1825
- Died: 1899 (aged 73–74)

Michael Müller C.Ss.R. (18 December 1825 – 1899) was a Catholic priest and writer of the 19th century in the United States.

== Life ==
In 1862, Mueller became pastor of the Redemptorist parish of Sts. Peter and Paul in Cumberland, Maryland, where he remained until 1866. During his tenure, the professed students were relocated from Cumberland to Annapolis.

Müller was a prolific writer. Of his Golden Rules for Directing Religious Communities, a review in The American Catholic Quarterly stated: "Whilst primarily intended for the superiors of Religious Houses, it will, we're sure, be appreciated by, and prove most valuable to all in authority."

== Teachings ==
Regarding salvation for those outside the Catholic Church, Fr. Müller wrote: "The Church, therefore, is not one religious body among many; it is the only religious body, inherent in the divine order of creation [...] The lesson, therefore, on the Church must be plain, and solid, and deeply impressed upon all who wish to be saved; all must learn and understand that only the Catholic Church is the Teacher from God, and the reasons why salvation out of her is impossible.

He wrote on the concept of invincible or inculpable ignorance: "inculpable ignorance of the fundamental principles of faith excuses a heathen from the sin of infidelity, and a Protestant from the sin of heresy; because such invincible ignorance, being only a simple involuntary privation, is no sin."

"But such ignorance has never been the means of salvation. From the fact that a person who lives up to the dictates of his conscience, and who cannot sin against the true religion on account of being ignorant of it, many have drawn the false conclusion that such a person is saved, or, in other words, is in the state of sanctifying grace, thus making ignorance a means of salvation or justification."

"Inculpable ignorance has never been a means of grace or salvation, not even for the inculpably ignorant people that live up to their conscience. But of this class of ignorant persons we say, with Saint Thomas Aquinas, that God in His mercy will lead these souls to the knowledge of the necessary truths of salvation, even send them an angel, if necessary, to instruct them, rather than let them perish without their fault. If they accept this grace, they will be saved as Catholics."

Müller did, however, teach baptism of desire and baptism of blood.

== Works ==
- The Blessed Eucharist: Our Greatest Treasure (1868)
- Golden Rules for Directing Religious Communities, Seminaries, Colleges, Schools, Families, Etc. (1871)
- Prayer: the Key to Salvation (1874)
- Familiar Explanation of Christian Doctrine (1875)
- Devotion of The Holy Rosary (1876)
- Triumph of the Blessed Sacrament: Or History of Nicola Aubry (1877)
- The Prodigal Son, or, The Sinner's Return to God.
- Public School Education
- God the Teacher of Mankind (1877) in nine volumes:
  - Volume I. The Church and Her Enemies.
  - II. The Apostles Creed.
  - III. The First and Greatest Commandment.
  - IV. Explanation of the Commandments continued. (Google Books)
  - V. Dignity, Authority and Duties of Parents, Ecclesiastical and Civil Powers. Their Enemy.
  - VI. Grace and the Sacraments.
  - VII. The Holy Sacrifice of the Mass.
  - VIII. Holy Eucharist and Penance.
- The Catholic Dogma: Extra Ecclesiam Nullus Omnino Salvatur 1888
