= Leonard Feeney =

American Jesuit (1897–1978)

The Reverend Leonard Edward Feeney SJ
- Born: February 18, 1897; Lynn, Massachusetts, U.S.
- Died: January 30, 1978 (aged 80); Ayer, Massachusetts, U.S.
- Occupations: Priest, poet, lyricist, editor, chaplain
- Known for: Feeneyism

Ecclesiastical career
- Ordained: June 20, 1928

Leonard Edward Feeney (February 18, 1897 – January 30, 1978) was an American Jesuit Catholic priest, poet, lyricist, and essayist.

He articulated a strict interpretation of the Catholic doctrine extra Ecclesiam nulla salus ("outside the Church there is no salvation"). He took the position that baptism of blood and baptism of desire are unavailing and that therefore non-Catholics will not be saved. This position is called Feeneyism, coming from his last name.

Fighting against what he perceived to be the liberalization of Catholic doctrine, he was excommunicated by the Holy See in 1953. Feeney reconciled with the church in 1972, though never recanted his controversial views on salvation.

He was described as Boston's homegrown version of Father Charles Coughlin for his antisemitism.

== Early Life ==
Feeney was raised in Lynn, Massachusetts. His father, Thomas, contributed to the Irish freedom cause.

Feeney attended the St. Joseph Institute, a Catholic elementary school in Lynn. He was bullied by other children, and wrote in his memoir that he was beaten up for being a "sissie" because he was carrying his violin. He wrote that this experience of violence was why he believed in hell. "“The bullies will be burned” was infinitely more comforting than “they will not be considered nice little boys by God.” And if I had not known that the bullies would be burned, would I have ever got to sleep at all?," he wrote.

Lynn was a multicultural city. In his memoir, he recounted several stories about meeting people from other cultures, such as a Protestant shopkeeper and a Chinese laundryman. Most relevant to his future work, however, is his experience of following a Jewish peddler home, seeing his beautiful teenage daughter, and imagining her converting to Catholicism.

He attended Boston College High School, a Catholic high school run by the Jesuits. He was valedictorian of his graduating class.

He was the oldest of four children. One younger brother, Thomas, also attended Boston College High School and also entered the Jesuits. Another brother, John, studied at the College of the Holy Cross, a Jesuit-run college in Worcester, Massachusetts. John then spent a year studying literature at Harvard University before his entrance into formation for the diocesan priesthood. His sister, Eileen, attended Emmanuel College (Massachusetts), a Catholic women's college in Boston, and Lesley, a non-sectarian teacher's college.

== Clerical and Literary Career ==
He entered the Society of Jesus immediately after his graduation from high school.

He began to publish poetry while he was still in formation for the priesthood. In 1926, the Jesuits started a new magazine, Thought. It included one of Feeney's poems, 'Angelicus.' His fellow Jesuit Francis X. Talbot said Feeney "was born a poet, and must die a poet."

His first volume of poetry, In Towns and Little Towns, was published in 1927. Boston Globe writer Robert Denvir described Feeney in 1927 as "a beautiful spirit, a human being, and a charming man."

Feeney was ordained to the priesthood in 1928. This same year Feeney published a popular essay about the loss of Catholic presidential candidate Al Smith. Feeney, writing in the Jesuit magazine America, praised Smith for his commitment to the Catholic faith despite knowing it would hurt him electorally.

In 1929, he went to the United Kingdom to study. It was at Oxford that he met Frank Sheed. Sheed, a member of the Catholic Evidence Guild, was known for his public apologetics. Feeney admired Sheed's public preaching in Hyde Park, and he told the Boston Herald that people walking on Boston Common were unfamiliar with this kind of outdoor speaking. Frank Sheed was also the co-founder of Sheed and Ward, a Catholic publishing house that would become important in publishing English-language Catholic books, including Feeney's.

He returned to the United States in 1931, and taught English at the graduate school of Boston College, a Jesuit-run university in Newton, Massachusetts. While a professor at Boston College, he also gave guest lectures at other schools, such as the College of the Holy Cross and the Catholic club at Boston University. He did not have a high opinion of Boston College undergraduates relative to the students he met at Oxford, who he thought were more engaged in intellectual discussions.

In 1935, Francis X. Talbot, the literary editor at America, included Feeney in his St. Louis gallery of important living Catholic authors.

== Later Professional Career ==
=== America ===
In the 1930s, as a Jesuit, Feeney was a literary editor at the Jesuit magazine America.

Francis X. Talbot had become editor in chief after the previous editor in chief, Jesuit priest Wilfrid Parsons, had allowed an article that was too critical of the fascist regime in Italy to be published. Italian dictator Benito Mussolini asked Jesuit superior Wlodimir Ledóchowski to replace Parsons with someone who would be more sympathetic to fascism. Talbot was known for his conservatism; controversial priest Charles Coughlin would later ask Talbot for advice on resisting his bishop. Talbot's promotion created an opening for Feeney. Feeney would dedicate his 1944 essay collection The Leonard Feeney Omnibus to Talbot.

America was committed to the promotion of the Catholic faith, sometimes aggressively so. "It should be frankly acknowledged that in certain situations nothing is gained by reasonableness, prudence, and moderation. There the only course is to be noisy, raise a stir, and make people angry or scared," wrote Feeney's fellow Jesuit John LaFarge Jr. in 1938, writing about what the appropriate Catholic response should be to ex-nuns making negative comments about the Catholic church.

Feeney called for American saints, saying there should be a Saint Mary of Jersey City just as there was a Saint Rose of Lima. He also published a biography of Elizabeth Ann Seton, an American Catholic convert and founder of a women's religious order who was, at the time, in the process of canonization. In this book, he wrote that in the 19th century, Protestantism was "an excellent, if inadequate, force in the world of Christian thought," but that by 1938, "the conflict is not between heresy and truth, but between truth and utter darkness."

Feeney's work continued to be enjoyed widely by Catholics as well as non-Catholics. In 1939, a New York Times review of his book You'd Better Come Quietly said that Feeney's writings were "good popular theology, so sugar-coated that the pill of doctrine is almost undetectable."

=== Professor and polemics ===
He was a professor in Boston College's graduate school, and then professor of spiritual eloquence at the Jesuit seminary in Weston, Massachusetts. Thereafter, he became the priest chaplain at the Catholic Saint Benedict Center, a religious center at Harvard Square founded by Catherine Goddard Clarke, in 1945; Feeney had first visited in 1941. He gave incendiary speeches on the Boston Common on Sundays, leading Robert F. Kennedy, then a Harvard undergraduate, to write Archbishop Richard Cushing of Boston requesting his removal.

From 1945 to 1947 he was also the chaplain of the Newman Club at Lesley College, the non-sectarian teacher's college his sister had attended.

After April 1949 the affair became a public scandal when Feeney undertook in the press the defence of dismissed laymen who were teaching in the Jesuit College (founded in Boston by the Society of Jesus in 1863) that those who were not members of the Catholic Church were damned.

Feeney criticized Cushing for, among other things, accepting the church's definition of "baptism of desire". Finally, in 1949, Cushing declared Feeney's St. Benedict's Center off-limits to Catholics. That same year Boston College and Boston College High School dismissed four of the center's members from the theology faculty for spreading Feeney's views in the classroom. In light of his controversial behavior, his Jesuit superiors ordered him to leave the center for a post at College of the Holy Cross, but he repeatedly refused, which led to his expulsion from the order. Cushing suspended Feeney's priestly faculties in April 1949; Feeney continued to celebrate the sacraments although he was no longer authorized to do so.

Around this time, Fr. Feeney began speaking on Boston Common, gathering large crowds of up to 2,000 people to his public meetings, both supporters and hecklers. According to The Harvard Crimson, Feeney declared that in Catholic majority Boston, he wanted to "rid our city of every coward liberal Catholic, Jew dog, Protestant brute, and 33rd Degree Freemason who is trying to suck the soul from good Catholics and sell the true faith for greenbacks". Feeney would frequently throw visceral barbs back at his hecklers, describing them as "sexually degenerate, fairy, lewd, obscene, dirty, filthy, rotten, pawns, pimps, and frauds".

=== Excommunication ===
On 8 August 1949, Cardinal Francesco Marchetti Selvaggiani of the Holy Office sent a protocol letter to Archbishop Richard Cushing on the meaning of the dogma extra Ecclesiam nulla salus ("outside the Church there is no salvation"). This protocol had been approved by Pope Pius XII on 28 July 1949. The document states: "[T]his dogma [extra Ecclesiam nulla salus] must be understood in that sense in which the Church herself understands it. For, it was not to private judgments that Our Saviour gave for explanation those things that are contained in the deposit of faith, but to the teaching authority of the Church".

After Feeney refused twice to oblige to the Holy See's summons to Rome to explain himself, he was excommunicated on 13 February 1953 by the Holy See for his refusal to comply. According to Cardinal John Wright, Pope Pius XII personally translated the edict into English.

The decree of excommunication was later published in the Acta Apostolicae Sedis. His followers claimed that his excommunication was invalid.

Feeney continued to live in Cambridge. In 1954, Feeney's followers and Harvard undergraduates had an altercation that required university and city police to break up. He and his followers would put their Cambridge properties up for sale in 1958.

Following his excommunication, Feeney co-founded a community called the Slaves of the Immaculate Heart of Mary with Catherine Goddard Clarke.

This group later split in two, one of which became the Still River Branch, in good standing with the Catholic Church; the other is a schismatic group that holds to Feeney's views on Salvation.

=== Reconciliation with the Catholic Church and death ===
Feeney reconciled with the Catholic Church in 1972 without any recantation from his part on his positions on salvation. This reconciliation without Feeney's recantation, reports the National Catholic News Service, "came about at least in part through the intervention of Cardinal Humberto Medeiros of Boston who had attended lectures at St. Benedict's during his days as a seminarian. Cardinal John Wright, head of the Vatican's Congregation for the Clergy, reportedly personally brought the matter to the attention of the Congregation for the Doctrine of the Faith".

Feeney made few public appearances in his final years, because he was suffering from Parkinson's disease and a chronic heart ailment. He died in Ayer, Massachusetts, on January 30, 1978.

For Feeney's death, Cardinal Avery Dulles, who had previously been a pupil in Feeney's lectures, shared his reflection on and personal experience with Feeney.

== The Point ==
Feeney was editor of The Point, which ran a mixture of theological and political articles, some of them branded anti-semitic by Feeney's critics. The newsletter frequently contained sentiments such as:

the Church has never abandoned her absolute principle that it is possible for an individual Jew to scrap his hateful heritage, sincerely break with the synagogue, and cleanse his cursed blood with the Precious Blood of Jesus. (October 1957)

Those two powers, the chief two in the world today, are Communism and Zionism. That both movements are avowedly anti-Christian, and that both are in origin and direction Jewish, is a matter of record. (September 1958)

As surely and securely as the Jews have been behind Freemasonry, or Secularism, or Communism, they are behind the "anti-hate" drive. The Jews are advocating tolerance only for its destructive value — destructive, that is, of the Catholic Church. On their part, they still keep alive their racial rancors and antipathies. (July 1955)

The Anti-Defamation League of B'nai B'rith monitored The Point magazine for at least 14 editions. In 1955, the League exchanged correspondence with the Federal Bureau of Investigation regarding possible criminal investigation of Feeney and his followers, but no investigation was started.

== Reactions ==
As a Harvard undergraduate, Robert Francis "Bobby" Kennedy attended a meeting of students at which he stood up and challenged Feeney, later storming out following the priest's assertion that there was no salvation outside the Catholic faith. A similarly negative reaction to Feeney's teaching was recorded by British novelist and Catholic convert Evelyn Waugh, who wrote of visiting the priest while in the United States:

I went one morning by appointment & found him surrounded by a court of bemused youths of both sexes & he stark, raving mad. All his converts have chucked their Harvard careers & go to him only for all instruction. He fell into a rambling denunciation of all secular learning which gradually became more & more violent. He shouted that Newman had done irreparable damage to the Church then started on Ronnie Knox's Mass in Slow Motion saying 'To think that any innocent girl of 12 could have this blasphemous & obscene book put into her hands' as though it were Lady Chatterley's Lover. I asked if he had read it. 'I don't have to eat a rotten egg to know it stinks.' Then I got rather angry and rebuked him in strong words. His court sat absolutely aghast at hearing their holy man addressed like this. And in unbroken silence I walked out of the house. I talked to some Jesuits later & they said that he is disobeying the plain orders of his provincial by staying there. It seemed to me he needed an exorcist more than an alienist. A case of demoniac possession & jolly frightening.

A few years later Feeney wrote critically of Knox and Newman in his collection of essays London is a Place, with an unsympathetic passing reference to Waugh's biography of St. Helena:

on the list of [Knox's] recurrent callers, was Mr. Evelyn (pronounced Evil-in) Waugh, whose father, a London publisher, supplied his sons with early printing privileges in pornography, before one of them (Evelyn) turned to hagiography, and whitened his sepulchre with the life of a saint.

In 2003, in an article for The Jewish Week newspaper, editor Gary Rosenblatt wrote:

In a lesser-known case, Richard Cardinal Cushing excommunicated a priest, Leonard Feeney, in 1953, for preaching that all non-Catholics would go to Hell. Even though Father Feeney's words were based on the Gospel, Cardinal Cushing found them offensive, in large part because his sister had married a Jew, said Carroll, and the Cardinal had grown close to the family, sensitizing him to the Jewish perspective toward proselytization.

== Bibliography ==
- Chanler, Theodore (1940s), The children : nine songs for children's chorus and piano, words by Leonard Feeney, LCCN 88753009 Printed Music
- Chanler, Theodore (c. 1945), The children : song, words by Leonard Feeney; music by Theodore Chanler, LCCN 88753008 Printed Music
- Chanler, Theodore (1945), The children, words by Leonard Feeney; music by Theodore Chanler, LCCN 88752469 Manuscript Music
- Chanler, Theodore (1944), The flight, Theodore Chanler; words by Leonard Feeney, LCCN 88753128 Manuscript Music
- Chanler, Theodore (1940s), Love is now : song, words by Leonard Feeney; music by Theodore Chanler, LCCN 91759111 Manuscript Music
- Chanler, Theodore (1940s), Meet Doctor Livermore, Chanler; words by Feeney, LCCN 91760334 Printed Music
- Chanler, Theodore (1940s), Meet Doctor Livermore, Chanler; words by Feeney, LCCN 91760333 Manuscript Music
- Chanler, Theodore (1940s), Once upon a time, music by Chanler; words by Feeney, LCCN 88753011 Manuscript Music
- Chanler, Theodore (1940s), One and one are two, music by Chanler; words by Feeney, LCCN 88752470 Manuscript Music
- Chanler, Theodore, Sequence : five songs sung without pause, Chanler; words by Feeney, pp. 1940s, LCCN 88753130 Manuscript Music
- Crane, Nathalia; Feeney, Leonard (1939). The ark and the alphabet, an animal collection. New York: The Macmillan Company. LCCN 39031692.
- Feeney, Leonard (1935). Boundaries. New York: The Macmillan company. LCCN 35016455.
- Feeney, Leonard (1952). Bread of life. Cambridge, Massachusetts: Saint Benedict Center. LCCN 53015579.
- Feeney, Leonard (1938). Elizabeth Seton, an American woman. New York: America press. LCCN 38025911.
- Feeney, Leonard (1942). Fish on Friday. London: Sheed & Ward. LCCN 42025544.
- Feeney, Leonard (1934). Fish on Friday. New York: Sheed & Ward. LCCN 34009643.
- Feeney, Leonard (1989). The gold we have gathered : selections from the writings of Father Leonard Feeney. compiled by the Sisters of Saint Benedict Center, the Slaves of the Immaculate Heart of Mary, Inc. Still River, Mass.: The Center. LCCN 89194125.
- Feeney, Leonard (1943). In towns and little towns. New York: The America Press. LCCN 44003675.
- Feeney, Leonard (2004). In towns and little towns : a book of poems. Fitzwilliam, N.H.: Loreto Publications. ISBN 193027842X. LCCN 2004108326.
- Feeney, Leonard (1927). In towns and little towns; a book of poems. New York: The American press. LCCN 27012847.
- Feeney, Leonard (1943). The Leonard Feeney omnibus: a collection of prose and verse, old and new. New York: Sheed & Ward. LCCN 43018459. Archived from the original on 15 July 2010.
- Feeney, Leonard (1951). London is a place. Boston: Ravengate Press. LCCN 51005861.
- Feeney, Leonard (1947). Mother Seton, an American woman. New York: Dodd, Mead. LCCN 47011485.
- Feeney, Leonard (1975). Mother Seton : Saint Elizabeth of New York (1774–1821) (Rev. ed.). Cambridge [Mass.]: Ravengate Press. ISBN 0911218068. LCCN 75023224.
- Feeney, Leonard, ed. (1925). Poems for memory, an anthology for high school students. Chicago, Ill.: Loyola university press. LCCN 40023514.
- Feeney, Leonard (1933). Riddle and reverie. New York: The Macmillan company. LCCN 33036935.
- Feeney, Leonard (1936). Song for a listener. New York: The Macmillan company. LCCN 36021490.
- Feeney, Leonard (1980). Survival till seventeen. with an introd. by S. M. Clare (Memorial ed.). Still River, Mass.: St. Bede's Publications. ISBN 0932506089. LCCN 79025067.
- Feeney, Leonard, S.J. (1941). Survival till seventeen; some portraits of early ideas. New York: Sheed & Ward. LCCN 41002380.
- Feeney, Leonard (1970). You'd better come quietly; three sketches, some outlines and additional notes. Freeport, N.Y.: Books for Libraries Press. ISBN 0836915690. LCCN 79105011.
- Feeney, Leonard (1939). You'd better come quietly; three sketches, some outlines and additional notes [by] Leonard Feeney, S. J. New York and London: Sheed & Ward. LCCN 39031329.
- Feeney, Leonard (1945). Your second childhood; verses. Pictures by Michael Cunningham. Milwaukee: Bruce Pub. Co. LCCN 48003760.

== See also ==
- Feeneyism, a name for Feeney's vision of extra Ecclesiam nulla salus
- Slaves of the Immaculate Heart of Mary, the community he founded
