= Most Holy Family Monastery =

Sedevacantist Catholic organization

Monastery information
- Established: 1967
- Dedication: Traditionalist Catholic (Sedevacantism)

People
- Founder: Joseph Natale
- Abbot: Michael Dimond
- Important associated figures: Peter Dimond

Site
- Location: Fillmore, New York, U.S.
- Public access: No (previously yes)
- Website: vaticancatholic.com

Most Holy Family Monastery is an American sedevacantist traditionalist Catholic organisation, based in Fillmore, New York. The monastery was founded by Joseph Natale in the late 1960s, a Benedictine Catholic lay postulant who had attended the Saint Vincent Archabbey in Westmoreland County, Pennsylvania. Instead of taking vows with them, Natale left and set up his own monastery with a focus on disabled people with himself as Superior, living according to the Rule of St. Benedict. In the mid-1980s it had 10 monks, but by 1994 its numbers had dwindled to 3.

The monastery is not approved by the local Roman Catholic Diocese of Buffalo, and opposes the Second Vatican Council and the New Order of Mass. The monastery explicitly adopted sedevacantism in the 1990s when it came under the leadership of two brothers, (self proclaimed Brother) Michael and Peter (nee Frederick and Robert) Dimond. Under their leadership, the monastery gained a significant online presence promoting sedevacantism and conspiracy theories through its website VaticanCatholic.com and social media.

== History ==
The monastery's founder was Joseph Natale (1933-1995), who needed crutches to walk after contracting tuberculosis of the bone at the age of four. Natale entered the Saint Vincent Archabbey in Latrobe, Pennsylvania, in 1960 as a lay postulant, but left less than a year later to start his own religious community. According to an archivist of Saint Vincent Archabbey, Natale left before taking vows; he never actually became a Benedictine monk.

In 1967, a benefactor helped Natale purchase a property in Berlin, New Jersey to found a community there together with seven other men with disabilities. However, as there was only a small house there at the time and these men were unable to assist with the construction, Natale sent them away until the monastery could be finished. In subsequent years, Natale's vision for the institution changed. Natale started focusing more on what he perceived as guarding the Catholic religion against acts of the Church's hierarchy which Natale regarded as destructive of "the light of true Catholicism", such as the suppression of the Tridentine Mass and permission for use of natural family planning. By the mid-1970s, the monastery had broken off entirely from the institutional Church.

The monastery's chapel, named the St. Jude Shrine in honor of the "patron saint of hopeless causes," was blessed and dedicated on June 8, 1980. By 1987, the weekly service celebrated in this chapel was drawing about 150 worshipers each Sunday, and Michael Cuneo reported at the time of his visit in mid-1994 that the Sunday service was attended by "between two and three hundred people".

Initially incorporated in 1993 as the Queen of Angels Corp, the monastery is a New York Domestic Not-For-Profit Corporation under the business type "religious organization".

Natale died in 1995, whereupon Michael Dimond (born Frederick Dimond), was elected his successor as Superior. Michael Dimond had joined in 1992 at the age of 19, after converting to Catholicism four years earlier.

As of 2020, the monastery maintains a website which states that no one should receive communion or attend mass at any Catholic parish (including any sedevacantist groups), since they all preach heresies such as the doctrine of baptism of desire. However, they advise their followers to receive the sacrament of confession from Eastern Catholic priests, or from Latin Church priests ordained before 1968, when the Second Vatican Council changed the rite of ordination for the Latin Church.

== Claims of miraculous experience ==
According to Michael Cuneo, who researched various traditionalist movements in the USA, Natale claimed he had a gift of prophecy:

Even before Vatican II was finished, I knew, and knew absolutely, that it was part of a Communist conspiracy to destroy the Church. The bishops at the council wanted to democratize Catholicism, they wanted an egalitarian theology, and most of them were secret communists and Masons. They knew exactly what they were doing. My community here was the first one in the United States to see the council for what it really was, and we rejected it completely.

— Joseph Natale (as quoted by Michael Cuneo), Smoke of Satan (1999), p. 88

"Regardless of what you have been told, John Paul I did not die of natural causes. He was murdered. Shortly after his election I went into a kind of trance and was told that John Paul I would be murdered because he wanted to return the Church to its traditions. He was murdered by his own. The Communist infiltrators in the Vatican and the College of Cardinals, working together with the Masons, killed John Paul I. At the same time I also had a vision of John Paul II, and I was told that he would be the next pope and also that he would be an authentic pope, even though most of his actions would be controlled by Communist advisers and manipulators in the Vatican."

— Joseph Natale (as quoted by Michael Cuneo), Smoke of Satan (1999) pp. 88-89

Cuneo also reported that Natale told him that: "Five years [from 1994] is about all the time the world has left."

== Views ==
The monastery's website refers to the Catholic Church as "the Vatican II sect," and heretical. It claims that all popes since, as manifest heretics, are therefore incapable of being pope.

The monastery's website condemns natural family planning. The website regards statements from the Catholic Church condoning natural family planning from before Pius XII as "not infallible or binding" and in conflict with other Catholic teaching that they do consider infallible. The monastery's position is noted by Mary Farrell Bednarowski as "an admittedly rare example of contemporary opposition".

The monastery's website opposes the doctrines of baptism of desire and baptism of blood, and affirms that "outside the Catholic Church there is absolutely no salvation".

The monastery's website embraces Holocaust denial, calling the Holocaust "[t]he propaganda hoax which has been so effectively used to cement Jewish power and influence in the world, and to silence any questioning of Jewish activities, support for Israel or a Jewish agenda [...] we work to expose Jewish domination and evil Jewish enterprises in the world, which (one must say) constitute the main power of the secular conspiracy."

In 2008 the monastery published a book by Frederick Dimond ("Brother Michael") called UFOs: Demonic Activity & Elaborate Hoaxes Meant to Deceive Mankind.

=== Sacraments ===
None of the members of the monastery have been ordained to the priesthood. They believe that the mass of Paul VI, instituted post-Vatican II, is invalid. They also hold that even the Tridentine Mass as permitted by Benedict XVI in his 2007 Summorum Pontificum, is a compromised form of liturgy, because the 1962 Roman Missal that he approved includes changes made by Pope John XXIII, who they believe to be an antipope (along with Benedict XVI himself). Previously, the monastery considered attending the Divine Liturgy at a Byzantine rite Catholic Church, in Rochester, New York, was appropriate; however the monastery now regards that too as inadvisable.

== Criticisms ==
=== Catholic League ===
In 1999, the Catholic League, in its annual report on anti-Catholicism, described the monastery as "a dissident organization that challenges [...] papal authority", referring to the monastery's publication of a pamphlet entitled "101 Heresies of Anti-Pope John Paul II".

=== Southern Poverty Law Center listing ===
The monastery has been listed by the Southern Poverty Law Center as a hate group. It places them in a category of adherents of "radical traditional Catholicism, or 'integrism'." This category is said to "routinely pillory Jews as 'the perpetual enemy of Christ' and worse, reject the ecumenical efforts of the Vatican, and sometimes even assert that recent popes have all been illegitimate. They are incensed by the liberalizing reforms of the Second Vatican Council, which condemned antisemitism and the accusation that the Jewish people are collectively responsible for deicide in the form of the crucifixion of Christ in the document Nostra aetate."
