= Slaves of the Immaculate Heart of Mary =

Catholic religious communities in the US

Slaves of the Immaculate Heart of Mary (MICM) refers to several traditionalist Catholic religious communities that trace their origins to the St. Benedict Center, founded by Catherine Goddard Clarke in 1940 in Harvard Square in Cambridge, Massachusetts, United States. Several of the descendant religious communities were formerly practiced Feeneyism but have since rejoined the Catholic Church. Others remain independent adherents to Feeneyism.

In 1945, Leonard Feeney became chaplain of the center. He and Clarke established the Slaves of the Immaculate Heart of Mary, a Catholic community. The group relocated to Still River, a village in the town of Harvard, Massachusetts.

Following Clarke's death around 1968, the movement divided into three communities: the St. Benedict Abbey; the Sisters of St. Benedict Center, Slaves of the Immaculate Heart of Mary (Saint Anne's House); and the Slaves of the Immaculate Heart of Mary of Saint Benedict Center. In the mid-1980s, a fourth community split from the latter and established a separate community in Richmond.

The New Hampshire group has been designated a hate group by the Southern Poverty Law Center.

== History ==
=== Cambridge, Massachusetts ===
In 1940, Catherine Goddard Clarke and several associates founded the Saint Benedict Center in Harvard Square, Cambridge, Massachusetts, as a center for college students in the Boston area. Leonard Feeney, S.J., became the center's chaplain in 1945. He promoted a strict interpretation of the doctrine Extra Ecclesiam nulla salus ("outside the Church there is no salvation"). Feeney criticized Archbishop Richard Cardinal Cushing of Boston for, among other things, accepting the Church's teaching on baptism of desire.

In January 1949, a number of individuals who attended the center formed an unofficial religious community under Feeney's guidance. That same year, Cushing declared the Saint Benedict's Center off-limits to Catholics. Boston College and Boston College High School dismissed four of the center's members from the theology faculty for promoting Feeney's interpretation of Extra Ecclesiam nulla sallus doctrine in their classrooms, and after they had sent a letter to the administration accusing the theology department of teaching heresy. In light of his controversial behavior, Feeney's Jesuit superiors ordered him to leave the center for the College of the Holy Cross, but he repeatedly refused, which led to his expulsion from the order. Cushing suspended Feeney's priestly faculties in April 1949; Feeney continued to celebrate the sacraments, although he was no longer authorized to do so. After repeatedly refusing summonses to Rome to explain his views, he was excommunicated on February 13, 1953, by the Holy See for persistent disobedience to Church authority.

=== Still River, Massachusetts ===
Increasingly isolated in the Boston Catholic community, in January 1958, the group moved from Cambridge to a farm in the town of Harvard in Worcester County, where they settled. With the death of Clarke in 1968, the group began to fragment. Feeney died later, in 1978. The Still River property split among three groups, which are now reconciled with the Catholic Church:

- St. Benedict Abbey (Massachusetts), a member of the Swiss-American Congregation of Benedictine monasteries.
- Sisters of St. Benedict Center, Slaves of the Immaculate Heart of Mary (Saint Anne's House), canonically recognized by the Catholic Church as a religious community in the diocese of Worcester.
- The Slaves of the Immaculate Heart of Mary of Saint Benedict Center, Still River, Massachusetts, which Bishop McManus raised to a Public Association of the Faithful in the diocese of Worcester in 2017.

==== Immaculate Heart of Mary School ====
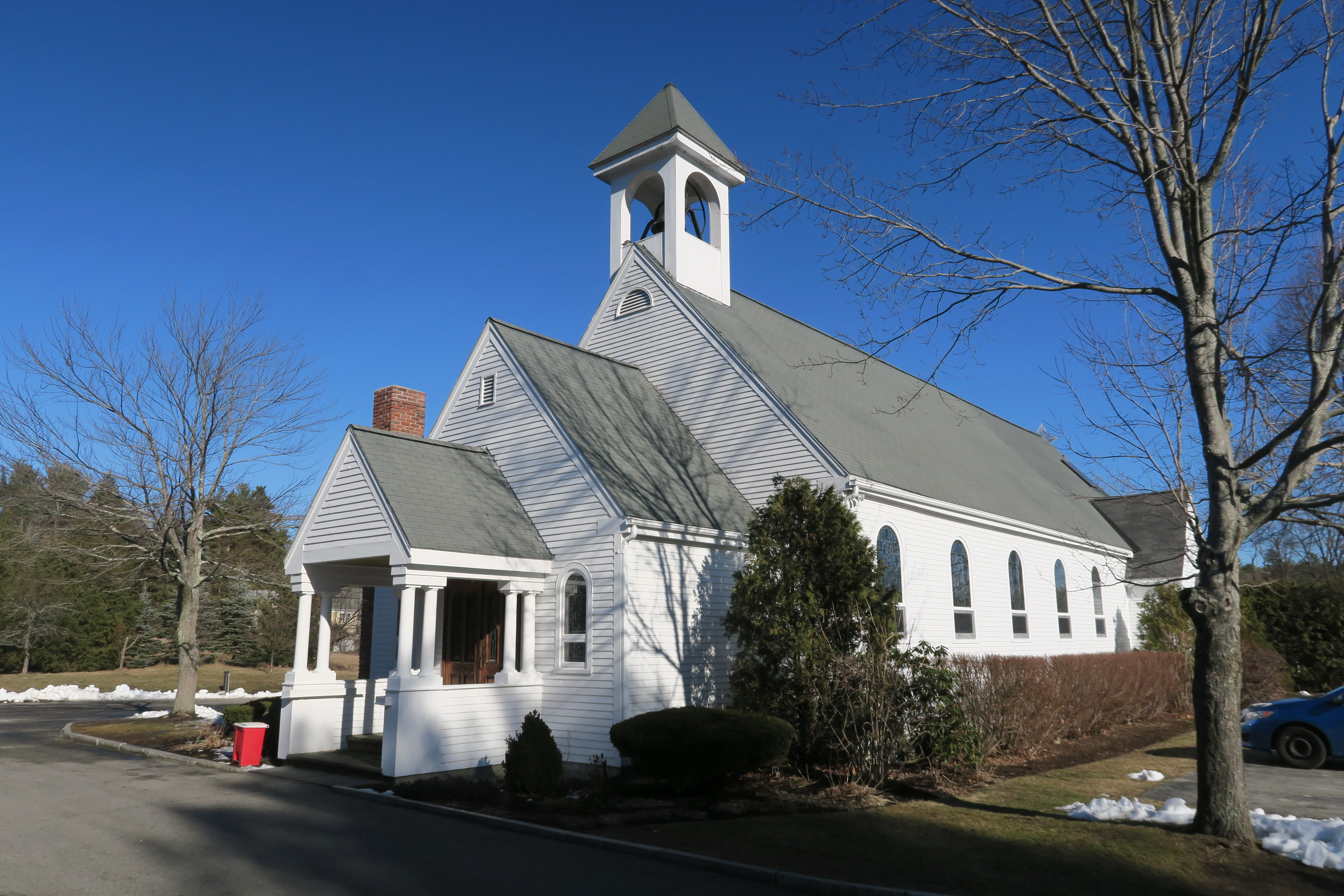
Chapel, Immaculate Heart of Mary School, Still River, MA

Immaculate Heart of Mary School is a private school located on the Saint Benedict Center property. It was established in 1976 and accommodates about 135 students in grades 1–12. Every school day begins with the Latin Tridentine Mass.

=== Richmond, New Hampshire ===
After an internal electoral struggle, and having lost a suit in civil court to compel his superiorship over the Slaves of the Immaculate Heart of Mary of Saint Benedict Center, Dr. Fakhri Boutros Maluf, who had taken the name Brother Francis, left the Slaves of the Immaculate Heart of Mary of Saint Benedict Center and founded a splinter group in Richmond, New Hampshire, as "founding superior" in the mid-1980s. Maluf was a Melkite by ascription. Maluf's group is named Slaves of the Immaculate Heart of Mary, Saint Benedict Center. It includes The Brothers, Slaves of the Immaculate Heart of Mary and The Sisters, Slaves of the Immaculate Heart of Mary.

The Saint Benedict Center has a 200-acre complex and by 2004, between 200 and 300 people were attending Mass at the church on the Lord's Day. Since 1989, several families have moved to area in order to be within close proximity of the Saint Benedict Center.

The Slaves of the Immaculate Heart of Mary located in Richmond, New Hampshire, has no official recognition by the Catholic Church. Of all the groups that embraced the thought of Fr. Feeney, that of Richmond is "the most radical faction" according to the Southern Poverty Law Center (SPLC). The SPLC classifies the center in Richmond, as well as the group's publishing arm Immaculate Heart Media, as an antisemitic hate group. The SPLC wrote that the Slaves of the Immaculate Heart of Mary "continue to endorse Feeney and to defend him from charges of anti-Semitism, despite his well-documented hatred of the Jews" and noted that in 2004, Bishop McCormack had rebuked the group as "blatantly anti-Semitic", and that in 2005, a brother of the Slaves had given a speech calling out the "Jewish nation" as "the perpetual enemy of Christ." The center denies being antisemitic.

In January 2019, the vicar for canonical affairs for the Roman Catholic Diocese of Manchester stated that the group had been directed to stop representing themselves as Catholic. The diocese published a clarification of the status of the Slaves of the Immaculate Heart of Mary and the St. Benedict Center, declaring that they were neither approved by the diocese nor considered to be Catholic. The diocese and Congregation for the Doctrine of the Faith in Rome found "unacceptable" the teachings of the St. Benedict Center, such as preaching that only Catholics can go to Heaven. That same document further states that priests are forbidden to say Mass at any church or chapel owned by the St. Benedict Center or the Slaves of the Immaculate Heart of Mary.

Out of pastoral concern for those who work, live at, or reside near the Saint Benedict Center, the bishop of Manchester arranged for the celebration of the extraordinary form of the Mass at the Saint Stanislaus Church in Winchester. The group was further directed to amend its IRS 501(c)(3), filing to remove any representation that it was affiliated with the Catholic Church. The group appealed to the Vatican to lift the precepts of prohibition placed upon them. In February 2021, the Congregation of the Doctrine of the Faith declined to consider this appeal because it had not been lodged before the statute of limitations ran out.
