= Avery Dulles =

American Jesuit cardinal and professor (1918–2008)

His Eminence Avery Robert Dulles SJ
- Cardinal-Deacon of SS. Nomi di Gesù e Maria
- Appointed: February 21, 2001
- Term ended: December 12, 2008
- Predecessor: Justinus Darmojuwono
- Successor: Domenico Bartolucci

Orders
- Ordination: June 16, 1956 by Francis Joseph Spellman
- Created cardinal: February 21, 2001 by Pope John Paul II
- Rank: Cardinal-deacon

Personal details
- Born: August 24, 1918 Auburn, New York, U.S.
- Died: December 12, 2008 (aged 90) New York City, U.S.
- Buried: Jesuit Cemetery, Auriesville, New York, U.S.
- Denomination: Roman Catholic
- Parents: John Foster Dulles (father) Janet Pomeroy Avery Dulles (mother)
- Occupation: Catholic priest; professor; theologian; author
- Education: Harvard University; Pontifical Gregorian University
- Motto: Scio Cui Credidi (I know whom I have believed; 2 Timothy 1:12)
- Coat of arms

Avery Robert Dulles (/ˈdʌlɪs/ DUL-iss; August 24, 1918 – December 12, 2008) was an American Jesuit priest, theologian, and cardinal of the Catholic Church. Dulles served on the faculty of Woodstock College from 1960 to 1974, of the Catholic University of America from 1974 to 1988, and as the Laurence J. McGinley Professor of Religion and Society at Fordham University from 1988 to 2008. He was also an author and lecturer.

== Early life ==
Dulles was born in Auburn, New York, on August 24, 1918, the son of John Foster Dulles, the future U.S. Secretary of State and for whom Dulles International Airport is named, and Janet Pomeroy Avery Dulles. His uncle was Director of Central Intelligence Allen Dulles. Both his great-grandfather John W. Foster and great-uncle Robert Lansing also served as secretary of state. His paternal grandfather, Allen Macy Dulles, was a member of the faculty of the Presbyterian Auburn Theological Seminary and published in the field of ecclesiology, to which his grandson would likewise devote scholarly attention as a Catholic.

He received his primary school education in New York City at the St. Bernard's School and attended secondary schools in Switzerland and the Choate School (now Choate Rosemary Hall) in Wallingford, Connecticut. He then enrolled at Harvard College in 1936.

Dulles was raised a Presbyterian but had become an agnostic by the time he was a student at Harvard. His religious doubts were diminished during a personally profound moment when he stepped out into a rainy day and saw a tree beginning to flower along the Charles River; after that moment he never again "doubted the existence of an all-good and omnipotent God." He noted how his theism turned toward conversion to Catholicism: "The more I examined, the more I was impressed with the consistency and sublimity of Catholic doctrine." He converted to Catholicism in the fall of 1940, much to the ire of his father, who nearly disowned him as a result.

After both winning the Phi Beta Kappa Essay Prize and graduating from Harvard in 1940, Dulles spent a year and a half at Harvard Law School, during which time he co-founded the "St. Benedict Center" with Catherine Goddard Clarke. The center later became well known due to the controversial Jesuit priest Leonard Feeney. Dulles served in the United States Navy during World War II, attaining the rank of Lieutenant. For his liaison work with the French Navy, Dulles was awarded the French Croix de Guerre.

== Society of Jesus and elevation to cardinal ==
Upon his discharge from the Navy in 1946, Dulles entered the Society of Jesus, and was ordained to the priesthood in 1956. After a year in Germany, he studied ecclesiology under the American Jesuit Francis A. Sullivan at the Gregorian University in Rome, and was awarded the doctorate of sacred theology in 1960.

Dulles served on the faculty of Woodstock College from 1960 to 1974, and at the Catholic University of America from 1974 to 1988. He was a visiting professor at the Gregorian University (Rome), Weston School of Theology, Union Theological Seminary (New York), Princeton Theological Seminary, Virginia Theological Seminary, Lutheran Theological Seminary at Gettysburg, Boston College, Campion Hall, Oxford, the University of Notre Dame, the Catholic University at Leuven, Yale University, and St. Joseph's Seminary, Dunwoodie. He was the author of over 700 articles on theological topics, as well as twenty-two books. In 1994, he was a signer of the document Evangelicals and Catholics Together.

Past president of both the Catholic Theological Society of America and the American Theological Society, and professor emeritus at the Catholic University of America, Dulles served on the International Theological Commission and as a member of the United States Lutheran-Catholic Dialogue.

Dulles was critical of dual-covenant theology, especially as understood in the U.S. Conference of Catholic Bishops' document Reflections on Covenant and Mission. He was a consultant to the Committee on Doctrine of the National Conference of Catholic Bishops.

Although Jesuits make a promise not to pursue ecclesiastical dignities and do not normally accept promotion within the Church hierarchy, Dulles was created a cardinal on February 21, 2001, by Pope John Paul II. He was not made a bishop, as is normally the case, as the pope had granted him a dispensation. His titular church and assignment was as Cardinal-Deacon of SS. Nome di Gesù e Maria in Via Lata. Because he had reached the age of 80 before becoming cardinal, Dulles was never eligible to vote in a conclave. Dulles became an honorary, non-voting member of the U.S. Conference of Catholic Bishops.

== Honors and awards ==
Dulles' awards included Phi Beta Kappa, the Croix de Guerre, the Cardinal Spellman Award for distinguished achievement in theology, the Boston College Presidential Bicentennial Award, the Christus Magister Medal from the University of Portland (Oregon), the Religious Education Forum Award from the National Catholic Educational Association, America magazine's Campion Award, the F. Sadlier Dinger Award for contributions to the catechetical ministry of the Church, the James Cardinal Gibbons Award from The Catholic University of America, the John Carroll Society Medal, the Jerome Award from the Catholic Library Association, Fordham Founders Award, Gaudium Award from the Breukelein Institute, and thirty-three honorary doctorates.

== Farewell address and death ==
In his later years, the cardinal lived with the effects of polio he had contracted in his youth. On April 1, 2008, Dulles gave his farewell address as Laurence J. McGinley Professor of Religion and Society. As Dulles was unable to speak, Fordham president Fr. Joseph O'Hare, S.J., read his address. In addition to the loss of speech, the use of his arms was impaired but his mind remained clear and he continued to work and communicate using his computer keyboard. Fr Joseph McShane, SJ also presented him with the university's President's Medal that evening. April 1, 2008 also marked the date the Cardinal's book, Church and Society: The Laurence J. McGinley Lectures, 1988–2007 (Fordham University Press, 2008) was released.

In his Farewell Lecture, the cardinal reflected on his weakening condition:

Suffering and diminishment are not the greatest of evils but are normal ingredients in life, especially in old age. They are to be expected as elements of a full human existence.

Well into my 90th year I have been able to work productively. As I become increasingly paralyzed and unable to speak, I can identify with the many paralytics and mute persons in the Gospels, grateful for the loving and skillful care I receive and for the hope of everlasting life in Christ. If the Lord now calls me to a period of weakness, I know well that his power can be made perfect in infirmity. "Blessed be the name of the Lord!"

On April 19, 2008, Pope Benedict XVI paid a visit to the ailing Dulles during his visit to the United States. Dulles prepared his written remarks to the pope prior to the visit.

Dulles died at 90 on December 12, 2008, at Fordham University in the Bronx, where he had lived for many years. His remains were buried in the Jesuit cemetery in Auriesville, New York.

== Works ==
Dulles wrote 25 books and hundreds of articles and essays. A catalogue raisonné including his many translations, forewords, introductions, reviews and letters to the editor, was published by Fordham University Press in 2012 under the title The Legacy of Avery Cardinal Dulles, S.J.: His Words and His Witness.

=== Partial list of publications ===
- Princeps Concordiae: Pico della Mirandola and the Scholastic Tradition – The Harvard Phi Beta Kappa Prize Essay for 1940, Cambridge, MA: Harvard (1941).
- A Testimonial To Grace Sheed & Ward, New York (1952); the fiftieth anniversary edition of this book was republished in 1996 by the original publishers, with an afterword containing his reflections on the past fifty years.
- Revelation and the Quest for Unity (1968)
- The Survival of Dogma (1971)
- Models of the Church, Doubleday (1974), ISBN 978-0-385-50545-1
- Models of Revelation (1983)
- Dulles, Avery (1985). The Catholicity of the Church. Oxford: Clarendon Press. ISBN 9780198266761.
- Dulles, Avery (1983). "The Catholicity of the Augsburg Confession". The Journal of Religion. 63 (4): 337–354. doi:10.1086/487060. S2CID 170148693.
- Models of the Church 2nd ed. (1987)
- The Craft of Theology: From Symbol to System (1992)
- The Assurance of Things Hoped For: A Theology of Christian Faith (1994)
- The Splendor of Faith: The Theological Vision of Pope John Paul II (1999; revised in 2003 for the twenty-fifth anniversary of the papal election)
- The New World of Faith. Our Sunday Visitor Publishing. 2000. ISBN 978-0-87973-692-7.
- Newman, Outstanding Christian Thinkers series. London, New York: Continuum International Publishing Group. 2002. ISBN 978-0-8264-6287-9.
- "Models of the Church", Expanded Edition, Image Classics (2002), ISBN 978-0-385-13368-5
- A History of Apologetics, Rev. Edition, San Francisco: Ignatius Press (2005), ISBN 978-0-89870-933-9
- Magisterium: Teacher and Guardian of the Faith, Sapientia Press of Ave Maria University (2007), ISBN 1-932589-38-4
- Church and Society: The Laurence J. McGinley Lectures, 1988–2007, Fordham University Press (2008), ISBN 0-8232-2862-2
- Avery Robert Dulles, Leon Klenicki, Edward Idris Cassidy (2001). The Holocaust, never to be forgotten. Paulist Press. ISBN 978-0-8091-3985-9.
- The Orthodox Imperative: Selected Essays of Avery Cardinal Dulles, S.J. First Things Press. 2012.

Catholic Church titles
Preceded by Justinus Darmojuwono	Cardinal-Deacon of Santissimi; Nome di Gesù e Maria in Via Lata; 2001–2008	Succeeded by Domenico Bartolucci
Academic offices
New office	Laurence J. McGinley Chair in Religion and Society at Fordham University; 1988–2008	Succeeded by Patrick Ryan
