= Catherine Goddard Clarke =

American Catholic religious founder

Catherine Goddard Clarke MICM
- Born: August 21, 1900
- Died: May 8, 1968 (aged 67); Still River, Massachusetts, U.S.
- Resting place: St. Benedict Center Cemetery
- Occupations: writer, educator, Catholic lay sister
- Known for: Founding Saint Benedict Center and the Slaves of the Immaculate Heart of Mary

Catherine Goddard Clarke MICM, also known as Sister Catherine, (August 21, 1900 – May 8, 1968) was an American Traditionalist Catholic writer, educator, and lay religious sister. She was the founder of the Saint Benedict Center in Cambridge, Massachusetts and, alongside Father Leonard Feeney, a founder of the Slaves of the Immaculate Heart of Mary.

== Biography ==
In 1940, Clarke sought permission from Cardinal William Henry O'Connell, Archbishop of Boston, to establish an educational center near Harvard University. Cardinal O'Connell granted her permission, and so she started Saint Benedict Center in Harvard Square, Cambridge. She led the center with the help of Avery Dulles, then a Harvard law student, and Christopher Huntington, a Harvard dean. Saint Benedict's provided religious instruction to Catholic students at Harvard and Radcliffe College. Dulles, who would later become a Cardinal, asked Clarke to serve as his godmother upon his conversion to Catholicism.

In 1942, Father Leonard Feeney, a Jesuit priest, became associated with the center. Clarke invited him to serve as the spiritual director of the center in 1943. Clarke, as one of the teachers, gave weekly evening lectures on church history at the center. The center later evolved into St. Benedict Abbey in Still River, Massachusetts.

On January 17, 1949, Clarke, Father Feeney, and Fakhri Maluf founding the Slaves of the Immaculate Heart of Mary, a Traditionalist Catholic religious community. The community adopted Louis de Montfort as their patron saint. Families associated with the St. Benedict Center moved to the religious community. Clarke served as a community leader of the Slaves of the Immaculate Heart of Mary, and taught the children at the community's school. She followed Feeneyism, a doctrinal position taught by Father Feeney that took the Catholic doctrine Extra Ecclesiam nulla salus literally, believing that there is no salvation outside of the Catholic Church. In one of her books, Clarke wrote that "in absolute literalness, we must admit that it is possible for a human being to lose his soul without being guilty of any sin committed by himself." She also reportedly taught that "martyrdom is the surest way to get into Heaven."

Clarke died from complications related to cancer on May 8, 1968.

== Allegations of abuse ==
The Slaves of the Immaculate Heart of Mary has been accused of being a cult by former members. In May 2020, Patricia Walsh Chadwick, a former member of the Slaves of the Immaculate Heart of Mary, accused Clarke of physically abusing her and other children that grew up in the religious community. Chadwick wrote about the alleged abuse in her memoir titled Little Sister. In this memoir, she wrote : "For much of my childhood, I grew up without the daily love and attention of my parents. I was just six years old when Leonard Feeney and Catherine Clarke made the decision that my siblings and I were to live apart from our parents. Later, Leonard Feeney pressured my parents to forsake their marital vows, no longer living as husband and wife. A celibate existence, they were told, was more conducive to a life dedicated to God. And so my parents complied."

== Selected works ==
Clarke wrote multiple books on Catholic history, theology, and spirituality including Our Glorious Popes, Charlemagne and the Finding of the Body of St. Anne, The Pontificate of Pope Saint Leo the Great, The Life of Saint Gregory the Great, Gate of Heaven, The Failure of Interfaith, Love Is The Spirit Of Truth, and The Loyolas and the Cabots.
