= New York State Route 19A =

State highway in western New York, US

New York State Route 19A
- Map of western New York with NY 19A highlighted in red

Route information
- Auxiliary route of NY 19
- Maintained by NYSDOT
- Length: 19.06 mi (30.67 km)
- Existed: 1930–present

Major junctions
- South end: NY 19 in Hume
- North end: NY 19 near Silver Springs

Location
- Country: United States
- State: New York
- Counties: Allegany, Wyoming

Highway system
- New York Highways; Interstate; US; State; Reference; Parkways
← NY 19	→ US 20

New York State Route 19A (NY 19A) is a north–south state highway in western New York in the United States. It is an alternate route of NY 19 between the town of Hume (at the hamlet of Fillmore) and the vicinity of the village of Silver Springs. NY 19A also serves the community of Portageville and the village of Castile. The portion of NY 19A south of Portageville closely follows the Genesee River. North of Portageville, the route parallels the Southern Tier Line. NY 19A was assigned as part of the 1930 renumbering of state highways in New York.

== Route description ==
NY 19A begins at an intersection with NY 19 in the hamlet of Fillmore, a former village in the town of Hume. It initially heads north through the northern portion of the community. Outside of Fillmore, the route curves to the northeast and heads through open, cultivated fields as it parallels the Genesee River, located to the southeast of NY 19A. Near the Allegany–Wyoming county line, NY 19A turns to follow a more northerly routing, matching a similar turn in the course of the nearby river.

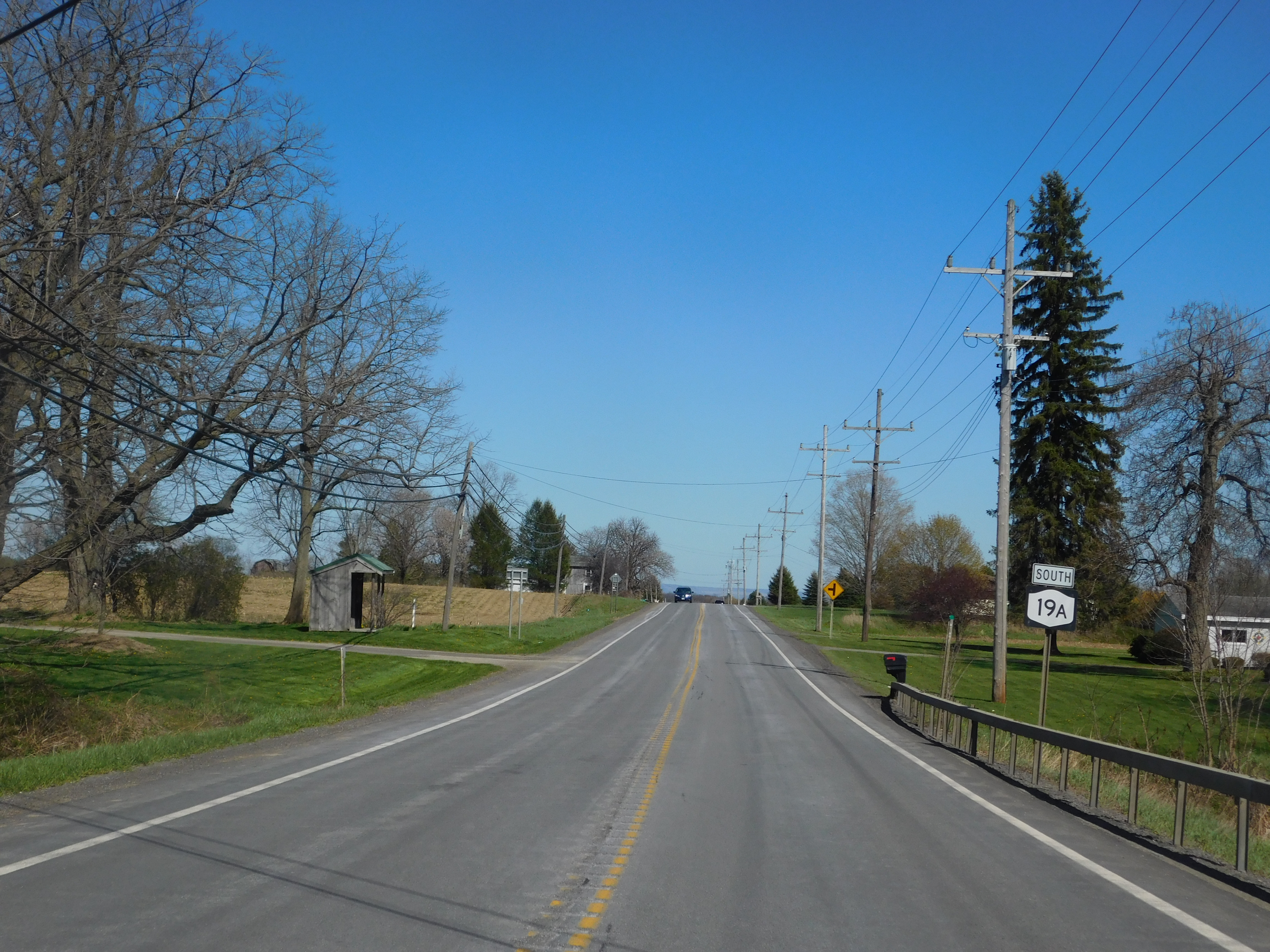
NY 19A southbound near the Gainesville–Castile town line

Now in the Wyoming County town of Genesee Falls, the landscape surrounding NY 19A becomes more forested as the highway approaches Letchworth State Park. NY 19A continues along the western bank of the Genesee River to the hamlet of Portageville, a riverside community located at the southern tip of the park. Here, NY 19A intersects NY 436 in the center of the community. NY 436 joins NY 19A here, and the two routes leave Portageville to the northwest. For the most part, NY 19A and NY 436 pass southwest of Letchworth State Park; however, they do connect to the park by way of a local park road just north of Portageville. In this area, the Genesee River turns northeast to flow through the park instead.

The overlap between NY 19A and NY 436 comes to an end 2 miles (3.2 km) northwest of Portageville at a junction known as Bigelow Corners. NY 436 heads west into the town of Pike; however, NY 19A continues northward along the Southern Tier Line, a railroad line owned by the Norfolk Southern Railway, into the town of Castile. Here, the forests that had surrounded NY 19A begin to give way to open fields as the route heads away from Letchworth State Park. NY 19A meets NY 39 just southwest of the village of Castile, and the two routes overlap for a mere 0.2 miles (0.3 km) into the village limits. After crossing the village line, NY 19A leaves NY 39 and heads northwest into the town of Gainesville. The route turns back to the north just west of the town line and continues onward through fields and forests toward the village of Silver Springs.

Silver Springs is the largest location along NY 19A; however, NY 19A is the only state highway that directly serves the village. It heads north through the residential western half of the village as Cummings Avenue to Perry Avenue, where it makes a turn to the west to avoid the junction of the Southern Tier Line and the Rochester and Southern Railroad. The route becomes Warsaw Boulevard upon rounding the curve; however, this name is dropped upon exiting the village. NY 19A continues through Gainesville and passes by cultivated fields and forested areas to a junction with NY 19, where it terminates.

== History ==
In 1908, the New York State Legislature created Route 16, an unsigned legislative route that initially extended from Cuba to Rochester via Fillmore, Warsaw, and Le Roy. At the time, Route 16 utilized modern NY 19 between Fillmore and Rock Glen, a hamlet south of Warsaw. On March 1, 1921, the route was realigned between the two locations to use current NY 19A instead. However, when NY 62 was assigned to most of legislative Route 16 between Belfast and Pavilion in the mid-1920s, it utilized the pre-1921 routing of Route 16 via Pike. The post-1921 alignment of legislative Route 16 between Fillmore and Rock Glen via Silver Springs remained unnumbered until the 1930 renumbering of state highways in New York when it became NY 19A, an alternate route of the newly assigned NY 19, itself renumbered from NY 62.

== Major intersections ==
County	Location	mi	km	Destinations	Notes
Allegany	Hume	0.00	0.00	NY 19 (Main Street / South Genesee Street)	Southern terminus; hamlet of Fillmore
Wyoming	Genesee Falls	9.16	14.74	NY 436 east – Nunda	Hamlet of Portageville; southern terminus of NY 19A / NY 436 overlap
Wyoming	Genesee Falls	11.29	18.17	NY 436 west (Denton Corners Road) – Lamont	Northern terminus of NY 19A / NY 436 overlap
Wyoming	Town of Castile	13.35	21.48	NY 39 west	Southern terminus of NY 19A / NY 39 overlap
Wyoming	Village of Castile	13.55	21.81	NY 39 east (South Main Street) – Perry	Northern terminus of NY 19A / NY 39 overlap
Wyoming	Town of Gainesville	19.06	30.67	NY 19 – Gainesville, Warsaw	Northern terminus
1.000 mi = 1.609 km; 1.000 km = 0.621 mi: Concurrency terminus
