= Castile (village), New York =

Castile, New York
- Village
- Location within the state of New York
- Coordinates: 42°37′47″N 78°3′17″W
- Country: United States
- State: New York
- County: Wyoming
- Settled: 1816
- Incorporated: June 19, 1877
- Named after: Likely the Kingdom of Castile

Area
  - Total: 1.36 sq mi (3.51 km^{2})
  - Land: 1.36 sq mi (3.51 km^{2})
  - Water: 0 sq mi (0.00 km^{2})
- Elevation: 1,355 ft (413 m)

Population (2020)
  - Total: 970
  - Density: 715.1/sq mi (276.11/km^{2})
- Time zone: UTC-5 (Eastern (EST))
  - Summer (DST): UTC-4 (EDT)
- ZIP code: 14427
- Area code: 585
- FIPS code: 36-12771
- GNIS feature ID: 0945981
- Website: castileny.gov

Castile is a village in Wyoming County, New York, United States. The population was 1,015 at the 2010 census.

The Village of Castile lies within the boundaries of the Town of Castile.

== History ==
The Village of Castile was incorporated in 1877.

== Geography ==
Castile is located at 42°37′47″N 78°3′17″W (42.629724, -78.05483).

According to the United States Census Bureau, the village has a total area of 1.4 square miles (3.5 km^{2}), all land.

New York State Route 39 passes through the village from northeast to southwest and then intersects New York State Route 19A.

== Demographics ==
Historical population
Census	Pop.	Note	%±
1870	712		—
1880	965		35.5%
1890	1,146		18.8%
1900	1,088		−5.1%
1910	1,040		−4.4%
1920	1,013		−2.6%
1930	900		−11.2%
1940	902		0.2%
1950	1,072		18.8%
1960	1,146		6.9%
1970	1,330		16.1%
1980	1,135		−14.7%
1990	1,078		−5.0%
2000	1,051		−2.5%
2010	1,015		−3.4%
2020	970		−4.4%
U.S. Decennial Census

As of the census of 2000, there were 1,051 people, 427 households, and 284 families residing in the village. The population density was 777.7 inhabitants per square mile (300.3/km^{2}). There were 458 housing units at an average density of 338.9 per square mile (130.9/km^{2}). The racial makeup of the village was 98.76% White, 0.38% Black or African American, 0.10% Native American, 0.19% Asian, and 0.57% from two or more races. Hispanic or Latino of any race were 0.48% of the population.

There were 427 households, out of which 32.8% had children under the age of 18 living with them, 51.1% were married couples living together, 10.8% had a female householder with no husband present, and 33.3% were non-families. 29.3% of all households were made up of individuals, and 13.6% had someone living alone who was 65 years of age or older. The average household size was 2.46 and the average family size was 3.02.

In the village, the population was spread out, with 25.7% under the age of 18, 9.7% from 18 to 24, 28.3% from 25 to 44, 21.3% from 45 to 64, and 15.0% who were 65 years of age or older. The median age was 38 years. For every 100 females, there were 95.4 males. For every 100 females age 18 and over, there were 89.1 males.

The median income for a household in the village was $34,519, and the median income for a family was $42,019. Males had a median income of $31,290 versus $20,167 for females. The per capita income for the village was $15,648. About 9.1% of families and 9.3% of the population were below the poverty line, including 6.6% of those under age 18 and 8.8% of those age 65 or over.
