= Feeneyism =

Theological doctrine derived from Leonard Feeney's teachings

Feeneyism, also known as the Boston heresy, is a Christian theological concept associated with the Jesuit priest Leonard Feeney. Feeneyism advocates an interpretation of the dogma extra Ecclesiam nulla salus ("outside the Church there is no salvation") claiming that only Catholics who are baptised with water can go to heaven. Feeneyism's denial of the doctrines of baptism of desire and baptism of blood, is considered a heresy by the Catholic Church.

In 1949, the Supreme Congregation of the Holy Office produced a document to correct the errors of Feeney's interpretation. The document states: "this dogma (extra Ecclesiam nulla salus) must be understood in that sense in which the Church itself understands it". After refusing to recant his claims, Leonard Feeney was excommunicated from the Catholic Church in 1953 by Pope Pius XII. Feeney later reconciled with the Church in 1972 (without recanting his condemned position on salvation), a few years before his death.

== Leonard Feeney ==
Leonard Feeney was a Catholic priest and a member of the Jesuits. He co-founded the group known as the Slaves of the Immaculate Heart of Mary with Catherine Goddard Clarke. Feeney was also the editor of The Point, which ran a mixture of theological and political articles, some of which were branded as anti-semitic by Feeney's critics. He was described by the Anti-Defamation League as "Boston's homegrown version of Father Charles Coughlin" for his antisemitism.

Robert F. Kennedy, then a Harvard undergraduate, met with Richard Cushing, the Archbishop of Boston requesting Feeney's removal. In 1949, Cushing declared Feeney's St. Benedict's Center off-limits to Catholics. That same year, Boston College and Boston College High School dismissed four of the center's members from the theology faculty for spreading Feeney's views in the classroom.

Around this time, Fr. Feeney began speaking on Boston Common, gathering large crowds of up to 2,000 people to his public meetings, including both supporters and hecklers. According to The Harvard Crimson, Feeney declared that in Catholic-majority Boston, he wanted to "rid our city of every coward liberal Catholic, Jew dog, Protestant brute, and 33rd Degree Freemason who is trying to suck the soul from good Catholics and sell the true faith for greenbacks". Feeney would frequently throw visceral barbs back at his hecklers, describing them as "sexually degenerate, fairy, lewd, obscene, dirty, filthy, rotten, pawns, pimps, and frauds".

On 4 February 1953, the Holy Office declared him excommunicated "on account of grave disobedience to Church Authority, being unmoved by repeated warnings". The Slaves of the Immaculate Heart of Mary later split in two: one group became the Still River Branch, in good standing with the Catholic Church; the other is a schismatic group that holds to Feeney's views on Salvation.

Decades later, Feeney reconciled with the Catholic Church in 1972 without any recantation on his part.

== Doctrine ==
Feeney's interpretation of the doctrine extra Ecclesiam nulla salus ("outside the Church there is no salvation") is that only Catholics that have been baptised with water can go to heaven. As such, Feeneyism opposes the doctrines of baptism of desire and baptism of blood. Feeney rejected what was the definition of the Catholic Church of baptism of desire at the time, i.e., the idea that people who openly affiliated with the Catholic Church as well as those spiritually linked to the Catholic Church through an implicit desire could be saved without the need for a water baptism.

== Condemnation of Feeneyism ==
Feeney's interpretation of extra Ecclesiam nulla salus was widely condemned by the Catholic Church and is still condemned to this day. In a 1949 letter to Cardinal Cushing, Archbishop of Boston, the Holy Office condemned Feeney's teaching that only those formally baptized in the Catholic Church can be saved. The Holy Office affirmed that those baptized by their desire can be saved. This letter was sent by Cardinal Francesco Marchetti Selvaggiani to Cardinal Cushing. This letter stated among other things:

The same in its own degree must be asserted of the Church, in as far as She is the general help to salvation. Therefore, that one may obtain eternal salvation, it is not always required that he be incorporated into the Church actually as a member, but it is necessary that at least he be united to Her by desire and longing. However, this desire need not always be explicit, as it is in catechumens; but when a person is involved in invincible ignorance God accepts also an implicit desire, so called because it is included in that good disposition of soul whereby a person wishes his will to be conformed to the will of God. These things are clearly taught in that dogmatic letter which was issued by the Sovereign Pontiff, Pope Pius XII, on June 29, 1943, On the Mystical Body of Jesus Christ (AAS, Vol. 35, an. 1943, p. 193 ff.). For in this letter the Sovereign Pontiff clearly distinguishes between those who are actually incorporated into the Church as members, and those who are united to the Church only by desire.

— Letter of the Holy Office

This letter is referenced in a footnote of the Catechism of the Catholic Church, in its section "Outside the Church there is no salvation", paragraph 847, as well as in a footnote in Lumen gentium.

== Feeneyite groups ==
- Slaves of the Immaculate Heart of Mary located in Richmond, New Hampshire
- Most Holy Family Monastery

== See also ==
- Michael Müller (writer)
