= Hume, New York =

- Town
- Location within New York Location within the United States
- Coordinates: 42°29′0″N 78°7′15″W
- Country: United States
- State: New York
- County: Allegany

Government
  - Type: Town Council
  - Town Supervisor: Dennis Ricketts (R)
  - Town Council: Members' List: • Bryce Bower (R); • Daniel P. Miller (R); • Greg McKurth (D, R); • Chris Austin (R)

Area
  - Total: 38.32 sq mi (99.25 km^{2})
  - Land: 37.89 sq mi (98.13 km^{2})
  - Water: 0.43 sq mi (1.12 km^{2})
- Elevation: 1,380 ft (420 m)

Population (2020)
  - Total: 2,094 ▲
  - Estimate (2021): 2,074
  - Density: 53.3/sq mi (20.58/km^{2})
- Time zone: UTC-5 (Eastern (EST))
  - Summer (DST): UTC-4 (EDT)
- ZIP Codes: 14745 (Hume); 14735 (Fillmore); 14776 (Rossburg); 14065 (Freedom)
- Area code: 585
- FIPS code: 36-003-36112
- GNIS feature ID: 0979084
- Website: www.humetown.org

Hume is a town in Allegany County, New York, United States. The population was 2,094 at the 2020 census. The town is on the northern border of Allegany County.

== History ==
Roger Mills, the first settler, arrived in 1806. The town of Hume was established in 1822 from part of the town of Pike in Wyoming County.

== Geography ==
According to the United States Census Bureau, Hume has a total area of 38.3 square miles (99 km^{2}), of which 37.9 square miles (98 km^{2}) is land and 0.4 square miles (1.0 km^{2}) (1.07%) is water.

The Genesee River flows through the eastern part of the town. The north town line is the border of Wyoming County. The bridge crossing the Genesee River in Fillmore was flooded in 1972.

New York State Route 19 passes through the town (north-south) and joins New York State Route 19A at Fillmore.

== Demographics ==
Historical population
| Census | Pop. | Note | %± |
|---|---|---|---|
| 1830 | 951 | | — |
| 1840 | 2,302 | | 142.1% |
| 1850 | 2,159 | | −6.2% |
| 1860 | 2,142 | | −0.8% |
| 1870 | 1,920 | | −10.4% |
| 1880 | 1,905 | | −0.8% |
| 1890 | 1,913 | | 0.4% |
| 1900 | 1,749 | | −8.6% |
| 1910 | 1,736 | | −0.7% |
| 1920 | 1,701 | | −2.0% |
| 1930 | 1,574 | | −7.5% |
| 1940 | 1,577 | | 0.2% |
| 1950 | 1,660 | | 5.3% |
| 1960 | 1,729 | | 4.2% |
| 1970 | 1,838 | | 6.3% |
| 1980 | 2,040 | | 11.0% |
| 1990 | 1,970 | | −3.4% |
| 2000 | 1,987 | | 0.9% |
| 2010 | 2,071 | | 4.2% |
| 2020 | 2,094 | | 1.1% |
| 2021 (est.) | 2,074 | | −1.0% |
U.S. Decennial Census

As of the census of 2000, there were 1,987 people, 766 households, and 542 families residing in the town. The population density was 52.4 inhabitants per square mile (20.2/km^{2}). There were 886 housing units at an average density of 23.4 per square mile (9.0/km^{2}). The racial makeup of the town was 98.79% White, 0.15% African American, 0.30% Native American, 0.20% Asian, and 0.55% from two or more races. Hispanic or Latino of any race were 0.35% of the population.

There were 766 households, out of which 34.2% had children under the age of 18 living with them, 56.7% were married couples living together, 10.2% had a female householder with no husband present, and 29.2% were non-families. 24.5% of all households were made up of individuals, and 10.1% had someone living alone who was 65 years of age or older. The average household size was 2.59 and the average family size was 3.06.

In the town, the population was spread out, with 29.0% under the age of 18, 8.4% from 18 to 24, 25.2% from 25 to 44, 23.8% from 45 to 64, and 13.6% who were 65 years of age or older. The median age was 36 years. For every 100 females, there were 97.5 males. For every 100 females age 18 and over, there were 92.6 males.

The median income for a household in the town was $32,128, and the median income for a family was $37,366. Males had a median income of $27,976 versus $19,479 for females. The per capita income for the town was $14,907. About 12.9% of families and 17.2% of the population were below the poverty line, including 24.0% of those under age 18 and 6.2% of those age 65 or over.

== Communities and locations in the Town of Hume ==
- Fillmore – The hamlet of Fillmore is located at the junction of Routes 19 and 19A on the west bank of the Genesee River.
- Hume – The hamlet of Hume (also called Hume Village and formerly called "Cold Creek") is northwest of Fillmore on Route 19.
- Mills Mills – A hamlet north of Fillmore named after early settlers of the Mills family.
- Rossburg – A hamlet northeast of Fillmore on Route 19A.
- Wiscoy – A hamlet north of Fillmore on Route 19A.
