= Nathalia Crane =

American poet

Nathalia Clara Ruth Crane
- Crane in a publicity photo c. 1925
- Born: August 11, 1913; Brooklyn, New York City, U.S.
- Died: October 22, 1998 (aged 85)
- Occupations: Author, professor
- Spouse(s): Vete George Black; Peter O'Reilly
- Writing career
- Language: English
- Genres: Fantasy, poetry

Nathalia Clara Ruth Crane (11 August 1913 – 22 October 1998) was an American poet and novelist who became famous as a child prodigy after the publication of her first book of poetry, The Janitor's Boy, written at age 10 and published two years later. Her poetry was first published in The New York Sun when she was only 9 years old, the paper unaware that she was a child. She was elected into the British Society of Authors, Playwrights, and Composers in 1925, written up in The American Mercury and later became a professor of English at San Diego State University.

After the publication of her second volume of poetry, Lava Lane, poet Edwin Markham implied that the publications were probably a hoax, stating "It seems impossible to me that a girl so immature could have written these poems. They are beyond the powers of a girl of twelve. The sophisticated viewpoint of sex, ...knowledge of history and archeology found in these pages place them beyond the reach of any juvenile mind."

Crane was dubbed "The Brooklyn Bard" by the time she was 13 and became part of the Louis Untermeyer poetry circle during her late teens, with Untermeyer contributing an introduction to her 1936 volume Swear by the Night & Other Poems. He was an early promoter of her work, stating, "some of the critics explained the work by insisting that the child was some sort of medium, an instrument unaware of what was played upon it; others, considering the book a hoax, scorned the fact that any child could have written verses so smooth in execution and so remarkable in spiritual overtones" and that "the appeal of such lines is not that they have been written by a child but by a poet."

== Bibliography ==
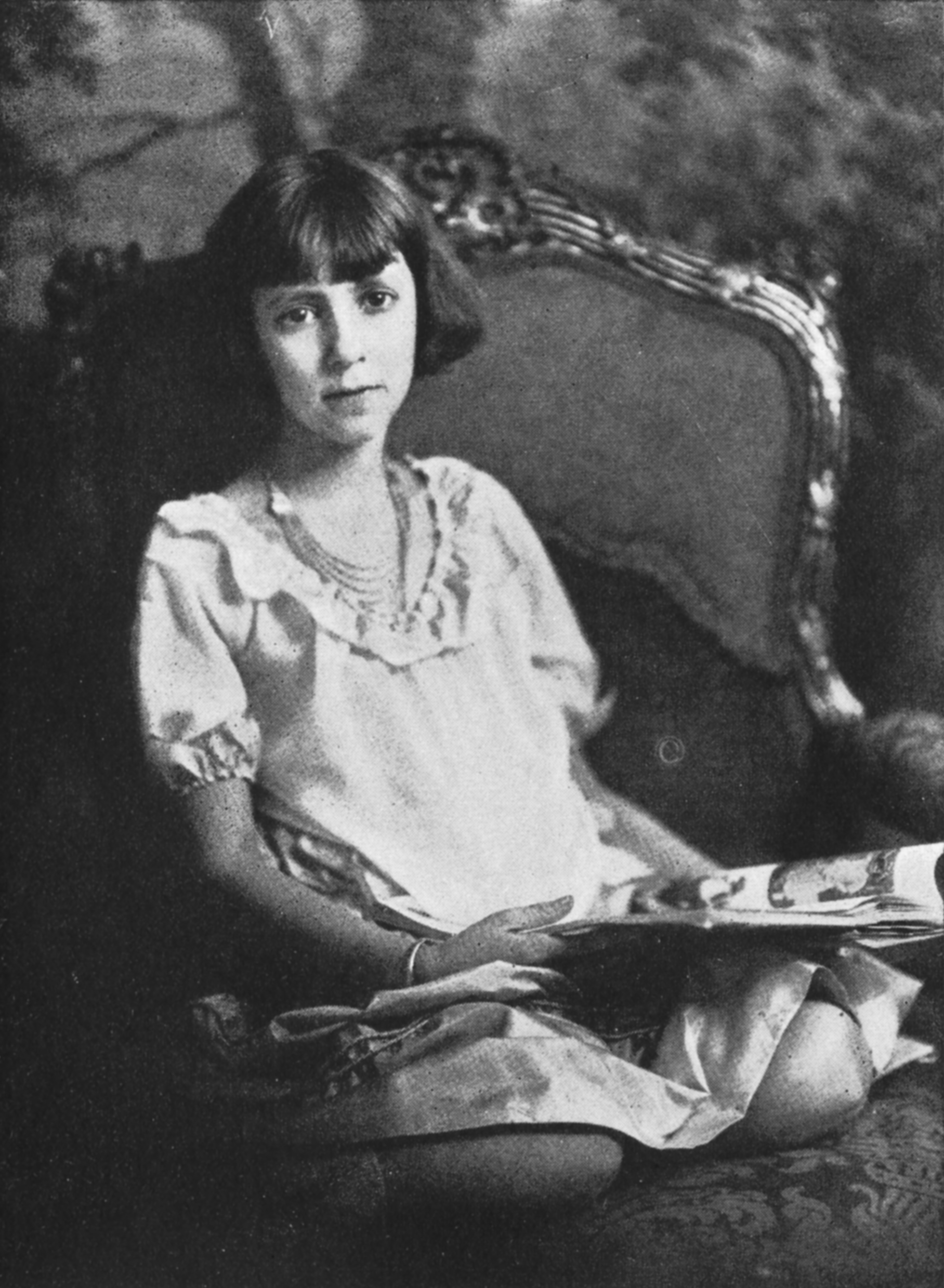
Photograph from The Janitor's Boy: And Other Poems (1924)

=== Poetry ===
- n.d., The Pamphlet Pacts. New York: Simon & Schuster. OCLC 15723289
- 1924, The Janitor's Boy: And Other Poems. New York: Thomas Seltzer. OCLC 593572
- 1925, Lava Lane, and Other Poems. New York: Thomas Seltzer. OCLC 40861749
- 1926, The Singing Crow. New York: A. & C. Boni. OCLC 26194523
- 1928, Venus Invisible: And Other Poems. New York: Coward-McCann. OCLC 1487072
- 1930, Pocahontas. New York: E.P. Dutton & Co., Inc. OCLC 1395035
- 1936, Swear by the Night. New York: Random House. OCLC 330949866
- 1939, with Leonard Feeney, The Ark and the Alphabet: An Animal Collection. New York: The Macmillan Company. OCLC 1394769
- 1941, In the Last Lodging of Simplicity.... Richmond Hill, NY: Monastine Press. OCLC 9989633
- 1942, The Death of Poetry: A Dramatic Poem in Two Parts. New York: The Monastine Press. OCLC 4772185
- 1969, The Campus Drum Beat. El Cajon, CA: Cal-West. OCLC 12183657

=== Novels ===
- 1926, The Sunken Garden. New York: Thomas Seltzer. OCLC 3373060
- 1929, An Alien from Heaven. New York: Coward-McCann. OCLC 4068669

=== Other ===
- 1925, with Frances E. Friedman, Nathalia Crane Song Book. New York: Thomas Seltzer. OCLC 4380011
- 1926, Nathalia Crane. New York: Simon & Schuster.
