= Fillmore, New York =

- Hamlet and CDP
- Location within the state of New York
- Coordinates: 42°27′58″N 78°6′53″W
- Country: United States
- State: New York
- County: Allegany
- Town: Hume
- Incorporated: November 24, 1924
- Dissolved: December 31, 1994

Area
  - Total: 0.95 sq mi (2.46 km^{2})
  - Land: 0.95 sq mi (2.46 km^{2})
  - Water: 0 sq mi (0.00 km^{2})
- Elevation: 1,200 ft (370 m)

Population (2020)
  - Total: 596
  - Density: 627.8/sq mi (242.39/km^{2})
- Time zone: UTC-5 (Eastern (EST))
  - Summer (DST): UTC-4 (EDT)
- ZIP code: 14735
- Area code: 585
- FIPS code: 36-25747
- GNIS feature ID: 0950053

Fillmore is a hamlet (and census-designated place) in the town of Hume, Allegany County, New York, United States. As of the 2020 census, Fillmore had a population of 596. It was originally known as "The Mouth of the Creek" but was named for President Millard Fillmore in 1850. The former village of Fillmore dissolved its incorporation and is now simply a named hamlet southeast of the town center of Hume. Fillmore is the mailing address of the Hungarian Scout Camp, the main campsite of the Hungarian Scout Association in Exteris, although the camp is technically within the neighboring town of Granger. Fillmore is also the site of the Most Holy Family Monastery which was deemed a hate group by the Southern Poverty Law Center (SPLC) in February 2017.

== Geography ==
Fillmore is located where Cold Creek joins the Genesee River, at approximately 1,200 feet (370 m) above sea level, at the junction of County Road 4 and New York State Route 19 and New York State Route 19A. The hamlet is 1 mile (1.6 km) southeast of the town center of Hume and 4 miles (6 km) north of Houghton on Route 19 and 3 miles (5 km) south of Rossburg (another hamlet in the town of Hume) on Route 19A.

According to the United States Census Bureau, the Fillmore CDP has a total area of 0.81 square miles (2.1 km^{2}), all land.

== Demographics ==
Historical population
Census	Pop.	Note	%±
2020	596		—
U.S. Decennial Census
