= E. Calvin Beisner =

American scholar and academic

Ernest Calvin Beisner (born 6 December 1955) is an American Christian interdisciplinary scholar and writer in the fields of theology, Christian apologetics, church history, political philosophy, and environmental ethics and stewardship. He is the founder and national spokesman of the Cornwall Alliance for the Stewardship of Creation.

Beisner earned a B.A. in Interdisciplinary Studies in Religion and Philosophy from the University of Southern California in 1978, an M.A. in Society with Specialization in Economic Ethics from International College, Los Angeles in 1983, and a Ph.D. in Scottish History with a dissertation on the life and political thought of the 17th-century Scottish Covenanter lawyer and politician Sir James Stewart of Goodtrees (1635-1713) from the University of St. Andrews in 2003. He taught interdisciplinary studies at Covenant College from 1992 to 2000 and historical theology and social ethics at Knox Theological Seminary from 2000 to 2008. He has been a fellow of the Institute on Religion and Democracy and an adjunct fellow of the Acton Institute for the Study of Religion and Liberty.

The Heritage Foundation gave Beisner the "Outstanding Spokesperson for Faith, Science, and Stewardship" award at the Heartland Institute's Ninth International Conference on Climate Change in 2014.

Calvin Beisner is strongly against environmentalism, calling it "the greatest threat to civilization".
