= Patrick Ryan (Jesuit priest) =

American academic and Jesuit priest (1939–2025)

- Born: Patrick J. Ryan; August 11, 1939; New York City, U.S.
- Died: August 9, 2025 (aged 85); New York City, U.S.
- Education: Harvard University
- Occupations: Academic, Jesuit priest

Patrick J. Ryan (August 11, 1939 – August 9, 2025) was an American academic and Jesuit priest. He was the Laurence J. McGinley Professor of Religion and Society at Fordham University from 2009 to 2022.

Ryan died in The Bronx, New York, on August 9, 2025, at the age of 85.
