= Church visible =

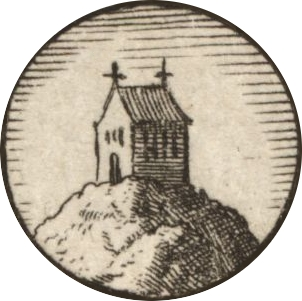
"[...] one holy Church is to continue forever. The Church is the congregation of saints, in which the Gospel is rightly taught and the Sacraments are rightly administered." – Augsburg Confession

Church visible is a term of Protestant Christian theology and ecclesiology referring to the visible community of Christian believers on Earth, as opposed to the Church invisible or Church triumphant, constituted by the fellowship of saints and the company of the elect.

In ecclesiology, the Church visible has many names, such as Kingdom of God, Disciples of Christ and People of God. St. Ignatius of Antioch was one of the first Christian authors to write about the subject, insisting that the Church visible was centered on the Bishop and the Eucharist or Last Supper.

In early Christianity, anti-Gnostic writers such as Irenaeus, or anti-Novatian writers like Cyprian of Carthage, would often focus on the visible Church in order to oppose various opinions deemed heretical. It was in this context that the expression Extra Ecclesiam nulla salus came about, which heavily insisted on the non-distinction between the visible and invisible Church.
