= Extra Ecclesiam nulla salus =

Christian doctrine of religious exclusivity

The Latin phrase extra Ecclesiam nulla salus (meaning 'outside the Church [there is] no salvation' or 'no salvation outside the Church') is a phrase referring to a Christian doctrine about who is to receive salvation.

The expression comes from the writings of Saint Cyprian of Carthage, a Christian bishop of the 3rd century. The phrase is an axiom often used as shorthand for the doctrine that the Church is necessary for salvation. It is a dogma in the Catholic Church and the Eastern Orthodox Church, in reference to their own communions. It is also held by many historic Protestant churches. However, Protestants, Catholics, and Eastern Orthodox each have a unique ecclesiological understanding of what constitutes "the Church". For some, the church is defined as "all those who will be saved", with no emphasis on the visible church. For others, the theological basis for this doctrine is founded on the beliefs that Jesus Christ personally established one (institutional) Church and that it serves as the means by which the graces won by Christ are communicated to believers.

== Scriptural foundation ==
The doctrine is based largely on Mark 16:15–16:

He said to them, "Go into the whole world and proclaim the gospel to every creature. Whoever believes and is baptized will be saved; whoever does not believe will be condemned."

== History ==
=== First appearance ===
The original phrase, Salus extra ecclesiam non est ('there is no salvation outside the Church'), comes from paragraph 21 of Letter LXXII, Ad Jubajanum de haereticis baptizandis, of Cyprian of Carthage (died 258). (Note that in some collections of Cyprian's letters in Latin, this is listed as Epistulae LXXIII.) The letter was written in reference to a particular controversy as to whether it was necessary to baptize applicants who had been previously baptized by heretics. In Ad Jubajanum de haereticis baptizandis, Cyprian tells Jubaianus of his conviction that baptism conferred by heretics is not valid. Firmilian (died c. 269) agreed with Cyprian, reasoning that those who are outside the Church and do not have the Holy Spirit cannot admit others to the Church or give what they do not possess.

=== Early Church Fathers ===
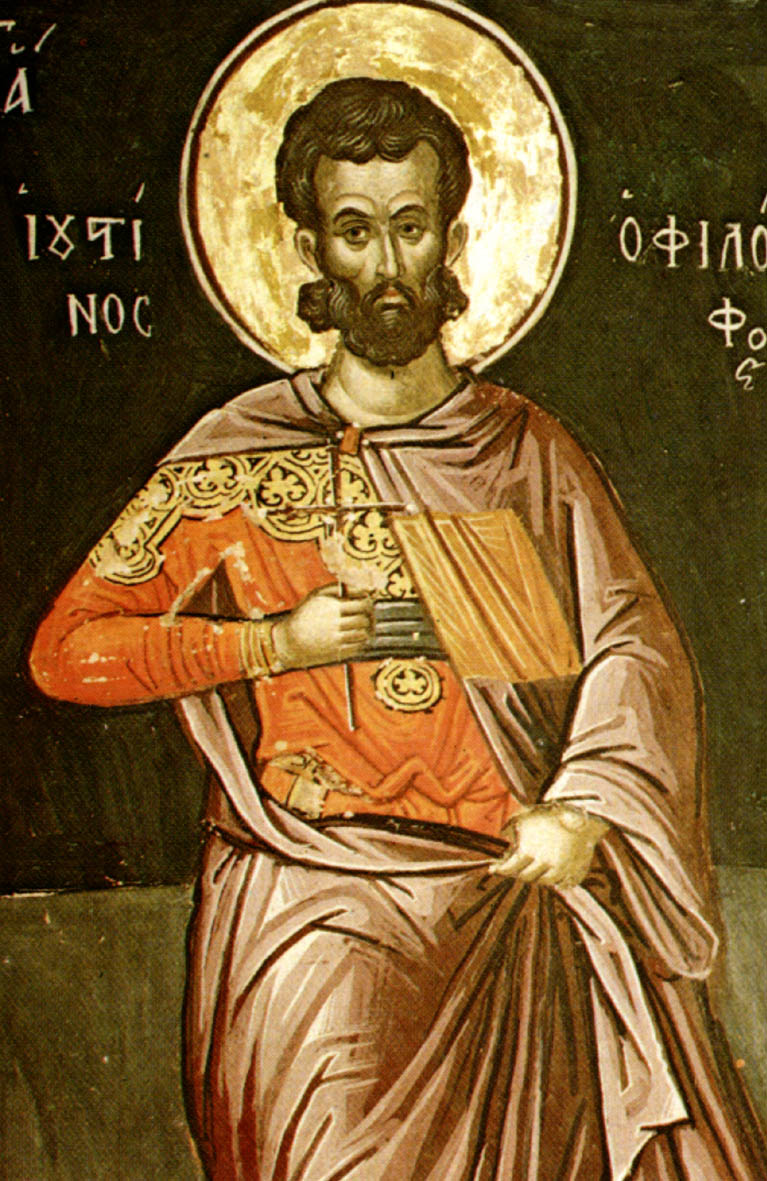
Justin Martyr

The concept was also referred to by Origen in his Homilies on Joshua, but neither he nor Cyprian were addressing non-Christians, but those already baptized and in danger of leaving the faith, as that would involve apostasy. Earlier, Justin Martyr had indicated that the righteous Jews who lived before Christ would be saved. He later expressed a similar opinion concerning Gentiles. Those who act pleasing to God, while not "being" Christian are yet in some sense "in" Christ the Logos.

Each one [...] shall be saved by his own righteousness, [...] those who regulated their lives by the law of Moses would in like manner be saved. [...] Since those who did that which is universally, naturally, and eternally good are pleasing to God, they shall be saved through this Christ in the resurrection equally with those righteous men who were before them, namely Noah, and Enoch, and Jacob, and whoever else there be, along with those who have known this Christ.

Gregory of Nazianzus took a rather broad view in his understanding of membership in the body of Christ. In the funeral oration for his father's death in 374, Gregory stated: "He was ours even before he was of our fold. His manner of life made him one of us. Just as there are many of our own who are not with us, whose lives alienate them from the common body, so too there are many of those outside who belong really to us, men whose devout conduct anticipates their faith. They lack only the name of that which in fact they possess. My father was one of these, an alien shoot but inclined to us in his manner of life". In other words, by their charity of life, they are united to Christians in Christ, even before they explicitly believe in Christ. Fulgentius of Ruspe took a much stricter view: "Most firmly hold and never doubt that not only pagans, but also all Jews, all heretics, and all schismatics who finish this life outside of the Catholic Church, will go into the eternal fire prepared for the devil and his angels".

Jerome wrote: "This is the ark of Noah, and he who is not found in it shall perish when the flood prevails". Bede continues this theme: "And according to this sense the ark is manifestly the Church, Noah the Lord who builds the Church".

Augustine of Hippo made numerous remarks in response to adversaries, often on opposite sides of this issue, once saying: "Whoever is without the Church will not be reckoned among the sons, and whoever does not want to have the Church as mother will not have God as father". He could also pick up on the sayings of the Fathers, and be completely inclusive in his assessment: "All together we are members of Christ and are his body [...] throughout the world [...] from Abel the just until the end of time [...] whoever among the just made his passage throughout this life, whether now [...] or in the generations to come, all the just are this one body of Christ, and individually his members".

=== Other views ===
Novatian (200–258), considered an antipope and a schismatic by the early church, says that the church is not for salvation, but that is a congregation of saints.

== Catholic Church ==
Writing while still a cardinal, Pope Benedict XVI (died 2022) commented that Cyprian was not expressing a theory on the eternal fate of all baptized and non-baptized persons.

The 1992 Catechism of the Catholic Church explained this as "all salvation comes from Christ the Head through the Church which is His Body".

- Pope Pelagius II (died 590): "Consider the fact that whoever has not been in the peace and unity of the Church cannot have the Lord [...] Although given over to flames and fires, they burn, or, thrown to wild beasts, they lay down their lives, there will not be (for them) that crown of faith but the punishment of faithlessness. […] Such a one can be slain, he cannot be crowned. […] [If] slain outside the Church, he cannot attain the rewards of the Church".
- Pope Gregory I (died 604) in Moralia, sive Expositio in Job ("An Extensive Consideration of Moral Questions") said: "Now the holy Church universal proclaims that God cannot be truly worshiped saving within herself, asserting that all they that are without her shall never be saved". Pope Gregory XVI later quoted his predecessor in his 1832 encyclical Summo iugiter studio ("on mixed religious marriages").
- Pope Leo XII, (Ubi Primum #14, May 5, 1824): "It is impossible for the most true God, who is Truth itself, the best, the wisest Provider, and the Rewarder of good men, to approve all sects who profess false teachings which are often inconsistent with one another and contradictory, and to confer eternal rewards on their members… by divine faith we hold one Lord, one faith, one baptism, and that no other name under heaven is given to men except the name of Jesus Christ of Nazareth in which we must be saved. This is why we profess that there is no salvation outside the Church".
- Bishop John Carroll (died 1815), the first bishop in the United States, recognized a distinction between being in communion with the Church and being a member thereof:
  To be in the communion of the Catholic Church and to be a member of the Church are two different things. They are in the communion of profession of her faith and participation of her sacraments, through the ministry and government of her lawful pastors. The members of the Catholic Church are all those who with a sincere heart seek the true religion and are in unfeigned disposition to embrace the truth wherever they find it. It never was our doctrine that salvation can be obtained only by the former.
  Carroll traces this analysis back to Augustine of Hippo.
- Francis Cardinal Bourne, Archbishop of Westminster from 1903 to 1935, summarized the Church teaching as follows:
  If God the Creator speaks, the creature is bound to listen and to believe what He utters. Hence the axiom "outside the Church there is no salvation". But, as it is equally true that without the deliberate act of the will there can be neither fault nor sin, so evidently this axiom applies only to those who are outside the Church knowingly, deliberately, and wilfully. […] And this is the doctrine of the Catholic Church on this often misunderstood and misrepresented aphorism. There are the covenanted and the uncovenanted dealings of God with His creatures, and no creature is outside His fatherly care. There are millions – even at this day the vast majority of mankind – who are still unreached or unaffected by the message of Christianity in any shape or form. There are large numbers who are persuaded that the old covenant still prevails and are perfectly sincere and conscientious in their observance of the Jewish Law. And there are millions who accept some fashion of Christian teaching who have never adverted to the idea of Unity as I have described it, and have no thought that they are obliged in conscience to accept the teaching and to submit to the authority of the Catholic Church. All such, whether separated wholly from acceptance of Christ and His teaching, or accepting that teaching only to the extent in which they have perceived it, will be judged on their own merits.

=== Councils ===
- Fourth Lateran Council (1215): "There is but one universal Church of the faithful, outside which no one at all is saved".
- Council of Florence, Cantate Domino (1441): "The most Holy Roman Church firmly believes, professes and preaches that none of those existing outside the Catholic Church, not only pagans, but also Jews and heretics and schismatics, can have a share in life eternal; but that they will go into the 'eternal fire which was prepared for the devil and his angels' (Matthew 25:41), unless before death they are joined with Her; and that so important is the unity of this ecclesiastical body that only those remaining within this unity can profit by the sacraments of the Church unto salvation, and they alone can receive an eternal recompense for their fasts, their almsgivings, their other works of Christian piety and the duties of a Christian soldier. No one, let his almsgiving be as great as it may, no one, even if he pour out his blood for the Name of Christ, can be saved, unless he remain within the bosom and the unity of the Catholic Church". The same council also ruled that those who die in original sin, but without mortal sin, will also find punishment in hell, but unequally: "But the souls of those who depart this life in actual mortal sin, or in original sin alone, go down straightaway to hell to be punished, but with unequal pains".

=== Papal letters ===
Pope Boniface VIII's bull Unam sanctam of 1302 was promulgated during an ongoing dispute between Boniface VIII and Philip IV of France. In it, Boniface declared, "We are compelled in virtue of our faith to believe and maintain that there is only one holy Catholic Church, and that one is apostolic. This we firmly believe and profess without qualification. Outside this Church there is no salvation and no remission of sins". The bull notably extends what had been ecclesiastical dictum into relations with temporal powers. According to Robert W. Dyson, there are some who hold that Giles of Rome might have been the actual writer of the bull. It claims: "We declare, say, define, and pronounce that it is absolutely necessary for the salvation of every human creature to be subject to the Roman Pontiff".

Pope Pius XI, in his 1928 encyclical Mortalium Animos, quotes from Lactantius: "The Catholic Church alone is keeping the true worship. This is the font of truth, this is the house of faith, this is the temple of God; if any man enter not here, or if any man go forth from it, he is a stranger to the hope of life and salvation". The Pope then specifies: "Furthermore, in this one Church of Christ, no man can be or remain who does not accept, recognize and obey the authority and supremacy of Peter and his legitimate successors".

=== Second Vatican Council ===
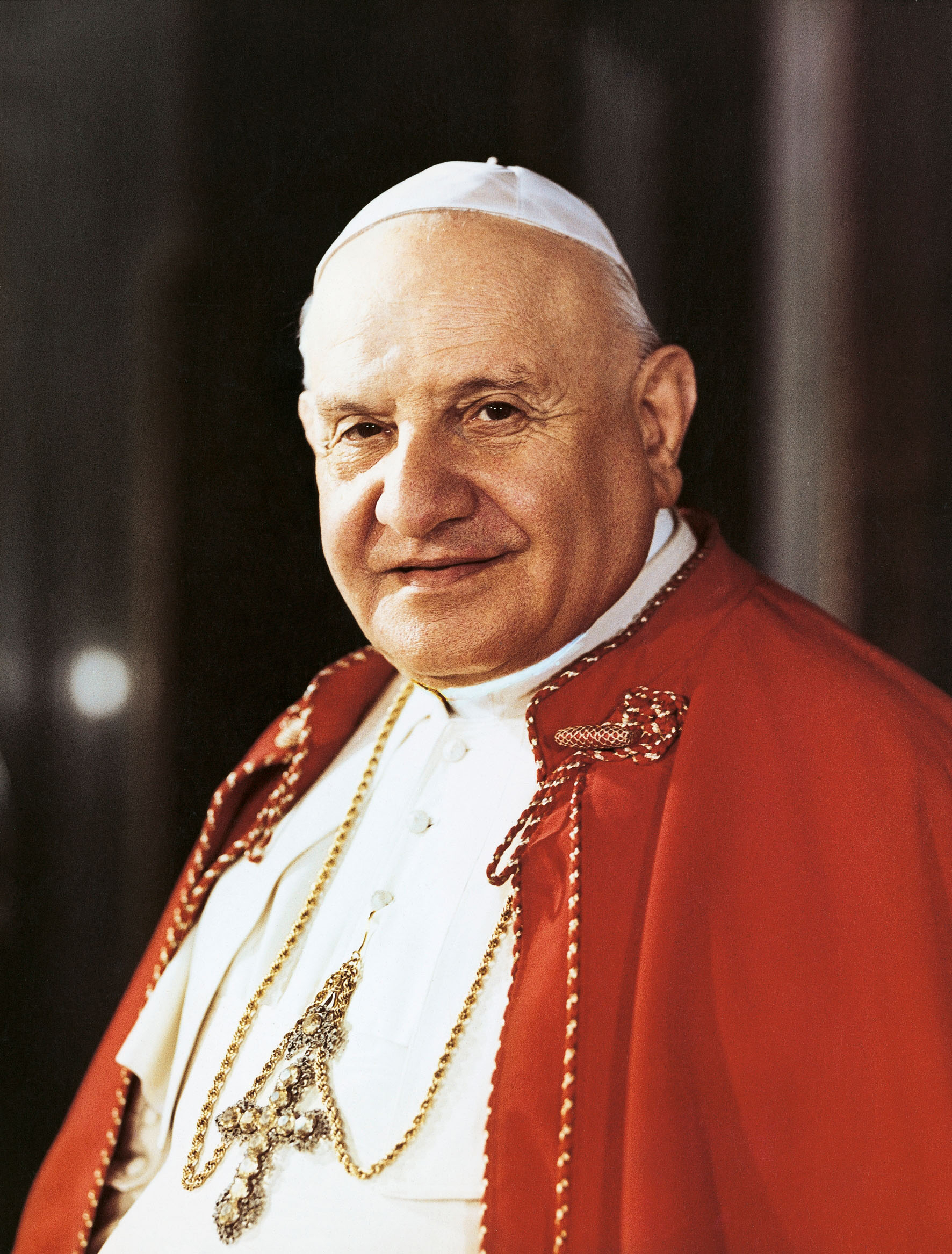
Pope John XXIII

In calling the Second Vatican Council, Pope John XXIII noted a distinction between the truths of faith and how those truths are conveyed. In the 1973 declaration Mystertium Ecclesiae, the Congregation for the Doctrine of the Faith recognized that the articulation of revealed truth would necessarily be influenced by historical factors.

The Second Vatican Council declared that the Christian communities that are not in full communion, but only in "partial communion" with the Catholic Church, "though we believe them to be deficient in some respects, have been by no means deprived of significance and importance in the mystery of salvation. For the Spirit of Christ has not refrained from using them as means of salvation which derive their efficacy from the very fullness of grace and truth entrusted to the Church". It explained that "some and even very many of the significant elements and endowments which together go to build up and give life to the Church itself, can exist outside the visible boundaries of the Catholic Church: the written word of God; the life of grace; faith, hope and charity, with the other interior gifts of the Holy Spirit, and visible elements too. All of these, which come from Christ and lead back to Christ, belong by right to the one Church of Christ".

These elements, it said, "as gifts belonging to the Church of Christ, are forces impelling toward Catholic unity". The Council identified Christ's Church on earth with the Catholic Church, saying: "This Church constituted and organized in the world as a society, subsists in the Catholic Church". The Congregation for the Doctrine of the Faith stated in a later doctrinal note that the term "subsistit in" and "is" are interchangeable, so that the "one true Church" is and subsists in the Catholic Church, according to Catholic teaching.

The Second Vatican Council also declared that "it is through Christ's Catholic Church alone, which is the universal help towards salvation, that the fullness of the means of salvation can be obtained. It was to the apostolic college alone, of which Peter is the head, that we believe that our Lord entrusted all the blessings of the New Covenant, in order to establish on earth the one body of Christ into which all those must be fully incorporated who belong in any way to the people of God".

=== Catechism of the Catholic Church ===
The Catechism of the Catholic Church states that the phrase, "Outside the Church there is no salvation", means, if put in positive terms, that "all salvation comes from Christ the Head through the Church which is his Body", and it "is not aimed at those who, through no fault of their own, do not know Christ and his Church". At the same time, it adds: "Although in ways known to himself God can lead those who, through no fault of their own, are ignorant of the Gospel to that faith without which it is impossible to please him, the Church still has the obligation and also the sacred right to evangelize all men". The Catechism also states that the Catholic Church "is joined in many ways to the baptized who are honored by the name of Christian, but do not profess the Catholic faith in its entirety or have not preserved unity or communion under the successor of Peter", and that "those who have not yet received the Gospel are related to the People of God in various ways".

=== Dominus Iesus ===
The 2000 declaration Dominus Iesus of the Congregation for the Doctrine of the Faith states that "it must be firmly believed that the Church, a pilgrim now on earth, is necessary for salvation: the one Christ is the mediator and the way of salvation; he is present to us in his body which is the Church. He himself explicitly asserted the necessity of faith and baptism (cf. Mk 16:16; Jn 3:5), and thereby affirmed at the same time the necessity of the Church which men enter through baptism as through a door". It then adds that "for those who are not formally and visibly members of the Church, salvation in Christ is accessible by virtue of a grace which, while having a mysterious relationship to the Church, does not make them formally part of the Church, but enlightens them in a way which is accommodated to their spiritual and material situation. This grace comes from Christ; it is [...] communicated by the Holy Spirit; it has a relationship with the Church, which, according to the plan of the Father, has her origin in the mission of the Son and the Holy Spirit".

=== Inculpable ignorance ===
In its statements regarding this doctrine, the Church expressly teaches that "it is necessary to hold for certain that they who labor in ignorance of the true religion, if this ignorance is invincible, will not be held guilty of this in the eyes of God", and that "outside of the Church, nobody can hope for life or salvation unless he is excused through ignorance beyond his control". It also states that "they who labor in invincible ignorance of our most holy religion and who, zealously keeping the natural law and its precepts engraved in the hearts of all by God, and being ready to obey God, live an honest and upright life, can, by the operating power of divine light and grace, attain eternal life".

=== Strict interpretation ===
Some traditionalists called Feeneyites (such as the Slaves of the Immaculate Heart of Mary of New Hampshire and Most Holy Family Monastery) believe that only Catholics baptized with water can be saved. They reject the concept of baptism by desire and baptism of blood, and say that only a properly performed rite with the use of water and the requisite words is sufficient.

== Eastern Orthodox Church ==
Kallistos Ware, a Greek Eastern Orthodox bishop, expressed this doctrine as follows:

"Extra Ecclesiam nulla salus. All the categorical strength and point of this aphorism lies in its tautology. Outside the Church there is no salvation, because salvation is the Church" (G. Florovsky, "Sobornost: the Catholicity of the Church", in The Church of God, p. 53). Does it therefore follow that anyone who is not visibly within the Church is necessarily damned? Of course not; still less does it follow that everyone who is visibly within the Church is necessarily saved. As Augustine wisely remarked: "How many sheep there are without, how many wolves within!" (Homilies on John, 45, 12) While there is no division between a "visible" and an "invisible Church", yet there may be members of the Church who are not visibly such, but whose membership is known to God alone. If anyone is saved, he must in some sense be a member of the Church; in what sense, we cannot always say.

== Lutheran interpretation ==
Martin Luther, the foremost leader of the Protestant Reformation, spoke of the necessity of belonging to the church (in the sense of what he saw as the true church) in order to be saved:

Therefore he who would find Christ must first find the Church. How should we know where Christ and his faith were, if we did not know where his believers are? And he who would know anything of Christ must not trust himself nor build a bridge to heaven by his own reason; but he must go to the Church, attend and ask her. Now the Church is not wood and stone, but the company of believing people; one must hold to them, and see how they believe, live and teach; they surely have Christ in their midst. For outside of the Christian church there is no truth, no Christ, no salvation.

Modern Lutheran churches "do agree with the traditional statement that 'outside the catholic church there is no salvation', but this statement refers not to the Roman organization but to the Holy Christian Catholic and Apostolic Church, which consists of all who believe in Christ as their Savior".

== Reformed interpretation ==
The Genevan reformer John Calvin, in his Reformation-era work Institutes of the Christian Religion, wrote: "beyond the pale of the Church no forgiveness of sins, no salvation, can be hoped for". Calvin wrote also that "those to whom He is a Father, the Church must also be a mother," echoing the words of the originator of the Latin phrase himself, Cyprian: "He can no longer have God for his Father who has not the Church for his mother".

Reformed scholastics accepted the phrase so long as the church is recognized by the marks of the church, which they defined as proper administration of the Word and sacrament, rather than apostolic succession.

The idea is further affirmed in the Westminster Confession of Faith of 1647 that "the visible Church, which is also catholic or universal under the Gospel (not confined to one nation, as before under the law), consists of all those throughout the world that profess the true religion; and of their children; and is the Kingdom of the Lord Jesus Christ, the house and family of God, out of which there is no ordinary possibility of salvation".

== Methodist interpretation ==
The Methodist tradition, inclusive of the holiness movement, holds that the office of the keys is exercised when the Church baptizes an individual and pronounces them saved. The office of the keys is furthermore exercised in the Church "binding and loosing", being able to excommunicate individuals from the sacraments as "ordinarily, no one is saved outside the visible church". The purpose of this is to allow individuals to repent and come into full communion with the Church so that they might receive "final salvation".

== See also ==
- Dominus Iesus
- Ecclesia semper reformanda est
- Error has no rights
- Exclusivism
- Religious exclusivism
- Subsistit in
