= Baptism of desire =

Christian doctrine

In Christian theology, baptism of desire (Latin: baptismus flaminis, lit. 'baptism of the breath', as the Holy Spirit is called the breath (flamen) of God), also called baptism by desire, is a doctrine according to which a person is able to attain the grace of justification through faith, perfect contrition and the desire for baptism, without the water baptism having been received.

== Denominational positions ==
=== Roman Catholicism ===
In the Catholic Church, baptism of desire "replace[s] Sacramental Baptism in so far as the communication of grace is concerned, but do[es] not effect incorporation into the Church, as [it] do[es] not bestow the sacramental character by which a person becomes attached formally to the Church".

The Catholic Church teaches in the Catechism of the Catholic Church that "baptism is necessary for salvation". It also states the desire for baptism "brings about the fruits of Baptism without being a sacrament". It further states that "[f]or catechumens who die before their Baptism, their explicit desire to receive it, together with repentance for their sins, and charity, assures them the salvation that they were not able to receive through the sacrament". Lastly, it adds: "Every man who is ignorant of the Gospel of Christ and of his Church, but seeks the truth and does the will of God in accordance with his understanding of it, can be saved. It may be supposed that such persons would have desired Baptism explicitly if they had known its necessity".

=== Feeneyism ===
The doctrine of Feeneyism is associated with the position of Leonard Feeney on the doctrine extra Ecclesiam nulla salus ("outside the Church there is no salvation"). Feeneyism's interpretation of the doctrine extra Ecclesiam nulla salus is that only Catholics can go to heaven and that only those baptised with water can go to heaven. Feeneyism opposes the doctrines of baptism of desire and baptism of blood as well as the view that non-Catholics can go to heaven.

=== Lutheranism ===
Lutheranism affirms that baptism is ordinarily necessary for salvation. However, citing the teaching of the early Church, Lutherans acknowledge a baptism of desire where a person desire baptism but could not receive it. Dismas, the repentant thief on the cross, is cited as an example of an individual who trusted in Jesus but did not have the opportunity to get baptized. As such, "though God ordinarily ties himself to the means of the sacrament, if one desires baptism but is unable to receive it prior to death, God counts one's desire as sufficient for the grace given".

== See also ==
- Baptism of blood
