= Baptism of blood =

Christian doctrine of salvific martyrdom

In Christian theology, baptism of blood (Latin: baptismus sanguinis) or baptism by blood, also called martyred baptism, is a doctrine which holds that a Christian is able to attain through martyrdom the grace of justification normally attained through baptism by water, without needing to receive baptism by water.

== Patristic period ==
Based on passages from the New Testament, many early Christian authors distinguished between water baptism and the second baptism, which was sometimes called blood baptism (e.g., by Cyprian of Carthage), but usually called martyrium (literally “testimony”; translated by “martyrdom”). In water baptism, man was purified on a conscious level. By the second baptism, the Christian was also delivered from his own “demons” (earthly attachments) on an unconscious level. Then the resurrection of the soul takes place: the 'old man' (man with the old consciousness) is changed into the 'new man' who receives the promise of eternal life in paradise after death. To endure the second baptism, it was common for Christians to submit to forms of torture in which they could lose their lives. It did not matter to Christians, because Christians were concerned with the life of the soul and not the life of the body.

Cyprian of Carthage in a letter of 256 regarding the question of whether a catechumen seized and killed due to his belief in Jesus Christ "would lose the hope of salvation and the reward of confession, because he had not previously been born again of water", answers that "they certainly are not deprived of the sacrament of baptism who are baptized with the most glorious and greatest baptism of blood".

Cyril of Jerusalem states in his Catechetical Lectures delivered in Lent of 348 that "if any man receive not Baptism, he hath not salvation; except only Martyrs, who even without the water receive the kingdom".

== Denominations' opinions ==
=== Overview ===
The baptism of blood doctrine is held by the Catholic Church, the Oriental Orthodox Churches, the Eastern Orthodox Church, and the American Association of Lutheran Churches.

=== Protestantism ===
==== Lutheranism ====
Those who die as Christian martyrs in a persecution of Christians are judged by Lutherans as having acquired the benefits of baptism without actually undergoing the ritual.

The Augsburg Confession of Lutheranism affirms that "Baptism is normally necessary for salvation". Citing the teaching of the early Church Fathers, Lutherans acknowledge a baptism of blood in "the circumstances of persecution".

==== Anabaptists ====
Anabaptists believe that those who die as Christian martyrs in a persecution of Christians receive the benefits of baptism without actually undergoing the ritual.

=== Catholic Church ===
In the Catholic Church, baptism of blood "replace[s] Sacramental Baptism in so far as the communication of grace is concerned, but do[es] not effect incorporation into the Church, as [it] do[es] not bestow the sacramental character by which a person becomes attached formally to the Church".

=== Feeneyism ===
Feeneyism rejects baptism of blood as well as baptism of desire.

== See also ==
- Baptism of desire
