= Ahl al-Fatrah =

People who lived between Jesus and Muhammad

In Islam, Ahl al-Fatrah (Arabic: أهل الفترة, lit. 'people of the time period') refers to the people who lived at any point between the Ascension of Jesus around 30 CE and Muhammad's first revelation around 610 CE. The term denotes a period of interval, when God did not send an Islamic prophet or messenger to spread awareness of Abrahamic monotheism amongst humanity. This interval came to an end around 610 CE, when Muslims believe that Muhammad first received God's final message before the Day of Judgement: the Quran.

Many Muslims also use the term in a general sense to refer to everyone who lives in ignorance of the teachings of Islam—that is, those who have not been invited to Islam in an uncorrupted manner. In Arabic, the term used was "conveyance of the message" (تبليغ الرسالة, Tabligh ar-Risalah).

The periods of Fatrah and Jahiliyyah are fairly similar in Islam, although there are some minor differences. Generally speaking, the former concept refers to those whom the message of God was not or could not be transmitted, typically due to the inconvenience of time or location. Meanwhile, the latter concept refers to those who might have had the option of following Abrahamic monotheism (i.e., becoming a hanif) as per their knowledge, but chose not to do so out of deliberate ignorance or pride.

== Afterlife ==
Accordingly, the people of the period are judged differently on the Day of Judgement. There is a difference of opinion between scholars of Islam on their afterlife.

=== Ashari view ===
The Ash'aris believed that those who did not receive the message would be forgiven, even idolaters. Their premise was that good and evil is based upon revelation; in other words, good and evil are defined by God. Therefore, in the absence of revelation, they cannot be held accountable.

Abu Hamid al-Ghazali categorized non-Muslims into three categories:

1. People who never heard of the message, who live in far away lands, such as the Byzantines ("Romans"). These will be forgiven.
2. People who were exposed to a distorted understanding of Islam and have no recourse to correct that information. These too will be forgiven.
3. People who heard of Islam because they live in neighboring lands and mix with Muslims. These have no hope of salvation.

He also wrote about non-Muslims who have heard a distorted message: "The name of Muhammad has indeed reached their ears, but they do not know his true description and his character. Instead, they heard from the time they were young that a deceitful liar named Muhammad claimed to be a prophet. As far as I am concerned, such people are [excused] like those who the call of Islam has not reached, for while they have heard of the Prophet’s name, they heard the opposite of his true qualities. And hearing such things would never arouse one’s desire to find out who he was."

Imam Nawawi said in his commentary Sharh Sahih Muslim that those who are born into idolatrous families and die without a message reaching them are granted paradise based upon the Qur'anic verse 17:15: "We do not punish a people until a messenger comes to them.".

=== Athari view ===
According to ibn Taymiyyah, these people who did not receive the message in this world will be tested in the afterlife. This view also shared and accepted by Ibn Qayyim al-Jawziyya, Abu Hasan al-Ash'ari, and Ibn Kathir, as they all based this ruling according to Hadith about the fates of four kinds of peoples:

1. Ahl al-fatrah, those who never received the call to Islam during their life
2. Those who suffered deafness before the teaching of Islam reached them
3. Those with mental illness and severe insanity (in another Hadith with similar narration also those with mental deficiency or low intelligence disabilities which prevent them to understand Islam properly)
4. Those who had suffered senility or dementia when the words of Islam reached him. (Note: This Hadiths were narrated with the chains of narration ended in by Abu Hurairah and Al-Aswad bin Sari and graded as hasan (sound) hadith according to Shuaib Al Arna'ut, while Ahmad ibn Hanbal, Al-Albani, and Al-Tabarani grade it as Saheeh. Meanwhile, another Hadith with similar narration from Anas ibn Malik also used for this ruling.)

According to Ibn Qayyim, Ibn Taymiyya, and other Islamic scholars who agreed on this Hadiths, this means those four type of peoples would be further examined by Allah, where these four type of person will be tested in the state where their senses and their minds in perfect condition, so they can understand they are being tested examined by God.

Muhammad Nasiruddin al-Albani, a Salafi scholar, stated on this matter: “The term Ahl al-Fatrah refers to everyone whom the dawah (message of Islam) has not reached in a correct manner as it came in the Shariah… Such people will not be punished on the Day of Judgement [for their disbelief in this world]. It is quite possible for People of the Interval to exist in every time period, whether before [the revelation of the final message of] Islam or after. The message has to have reached them in its pristine purity, without any distortions. In cases where the dawah reaches people in a mutilated form in which its essential components; its fundamental principles of belief, have been substituted, I am the first to say that the dawah has not reached them.”

Albani quoted Musnad Ahmad ibn Hanbal in his book, Al-Jami' al-Saghir, that Ahl al-Fatrah will be tested by commanded by a messenger to enter the hellfire, where if he or she obey the commands, they will be pass the test and allowed to enter Jannah, while if they refused, then they will be truly shoved into hell.

Abdul-Aziz Ibn Baz opined that the Ahl al-Fatrah will undergo special tests during Al-Qiyāmah (The Great Resurrection), but this ruling does not apply to those who choose to become polytheist during their life, since Abrahamic monotheism has existed even before Muhammad. Ibn Baz said even Abdullah ibn Abd al-Muttalib, father of Muhammad, also goes to hell, based on a Sahih Muslim Hadith.

Muhammad ibn al-Uthaymin also viewed that Ahl al-Fatrah will be tested in judgment day based on tradition from Abu Hurayra.

=== Sufi View ===
Ali al-Qari, 15th AD century Hanafi school scholar, also opined similar view to Atharis, with addendum that those tests did not apply to the monotheists before Muhammad (Hanif), such as Waraqah ibn Nawfal, or Zayd ibn Amr as they are considered as believers. Abd al-Aziz Al-Dabbagh echoed this addendum, as well as the falsity of the view that the entirety of Ahl al-Fatrah would be admitted to Paradise.

Ahmad ibn Idris al-Fasi, a Sufi known for his focus on the primary sources of Islam, explained his view as a reconciliation of the hadiths referring to being tested in the hereafter with the verse 17:15: "We do not punish a people until a messenger comes to them." in the following way: If the message of Islam hasn't reached someone, such as people of Ya'juj and Ma'juj (or Ahl al-Fatrah), or if they were a child or had lost their minds, on the Day of Judgment, they would be isolated from others, and a messenger would command them to enter the fire. Their compliance would determine their outcome.

== See also ==
- Islam
  - Ahl al-Kitab
  - Fasiq
  - Kafir and Munafiq
  - Mu'min and Muslim
- Christianity
  - Invincible ignorance (Catholic theology)
  - Fate of the unlearned
  - Universal opportunity
  - Virtuous pagan
- Judaism
  - Goyim
  - Righteous gentiles
