= Invincible ignorance fallacy =

Deductive fallacy of circularity where the person refuses to believe the argument

The invincible ignorance fallacy, also known as argument by pigheadedness, is a deductive fallacy of circularity where the person in question simply refuses to believe the argument, ignoring any evidence given. It is not so much a fallacious tactic in argument as it is a refusal to argue in the proper sense of the word. The method used in this fallacy is either to make assertions with no consideration of objections or to simply dismiss objections by calling them excuses, conjecture, anecdotal, etc. or saying that they are proof of nothing, all without actually demonstrating how the objections fit these terms. It is similar to the ad lapidem fallacy, in which the person rejects all the evidence and logic presented, without providing any evidence or logic that could lead to a different conclusion.

== History ==
The term invincible ignorance has its roots in Catholic theology, as the opposite of the term vincible ignorance; it is used to refer to the state of persons (such as pagans and infants) who are ignorant of the Christian message because they have not yet had an opportunity to hear it. The first Pope to use the term officially seems to have been Pope Pius IX in the allocution Singulari Quadam (9 December 1854) and the encyclicals Singulari Quidem (17 March 1856) and Quanto Conficiamur Moerore (10 August 1863). The term, however, is far older than that. Aquinas, for instance, uses it in his Summa Theologica (written 1265–1274), and discussion of the concept can be found as far back as Origen (3rd century).

When and how the term was taken by logicians to refer to the very different state of persons who deliberately refuse to attend to evidence remains unclear, but one of its first uses was in the book Fallacy: The Counterfeit of Argument by W. Ward Fearnside and William B. Holther in 1959.

== See also ==
- A posteriori
- A priori
- Future probation
