= Christian burial =

Religious funeral practice

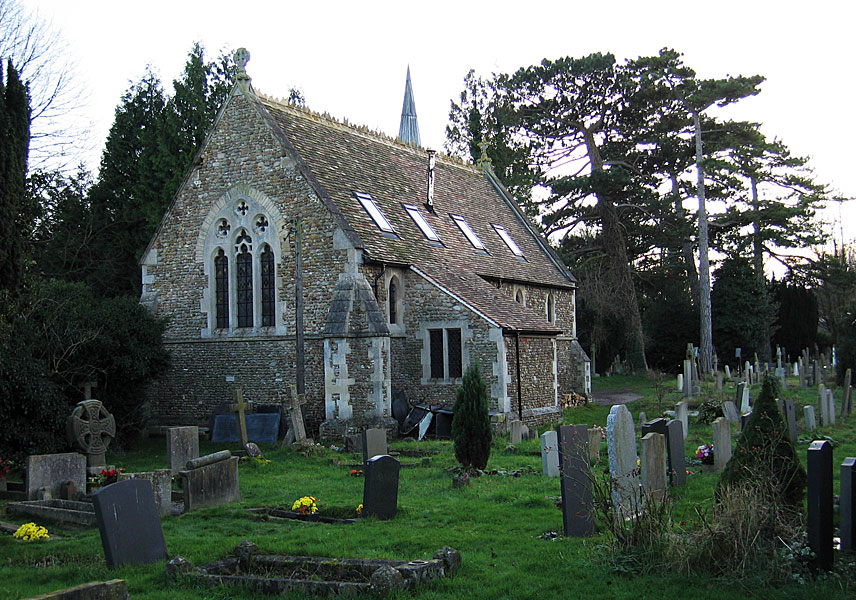
Ascension Parish Burial Ground, Cambridge, UK.

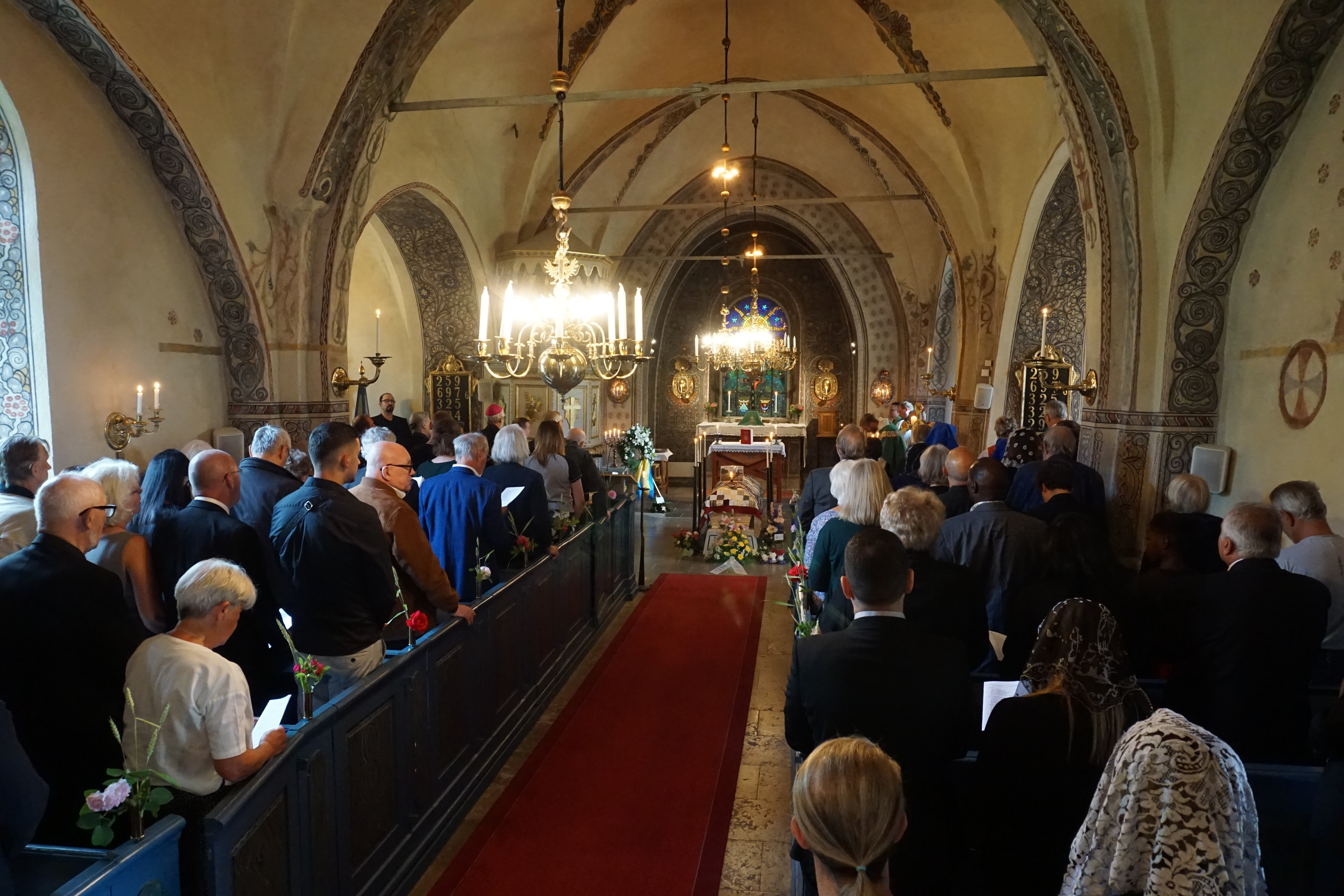
An Evangelical-Lutheran funeral Mass for a nun of the Sisters of the Holy Spirit at Alsike Church, Sweden (2023)

A Christian burial is the burial of a deceased person with specifically Christian rites; typically, in consecrated ground. Until recent times Christians generally objected to cremation and practiced inhumation almost exclusively. Today this opposition has largely vanished among Catholics and Protestants alike, and this is rapidly becoming more common, although Eastern Orthodox Churches still mostly forbid cremation.

== History and antecedents of Christian burial rites ==
=== Early historical evidence ===
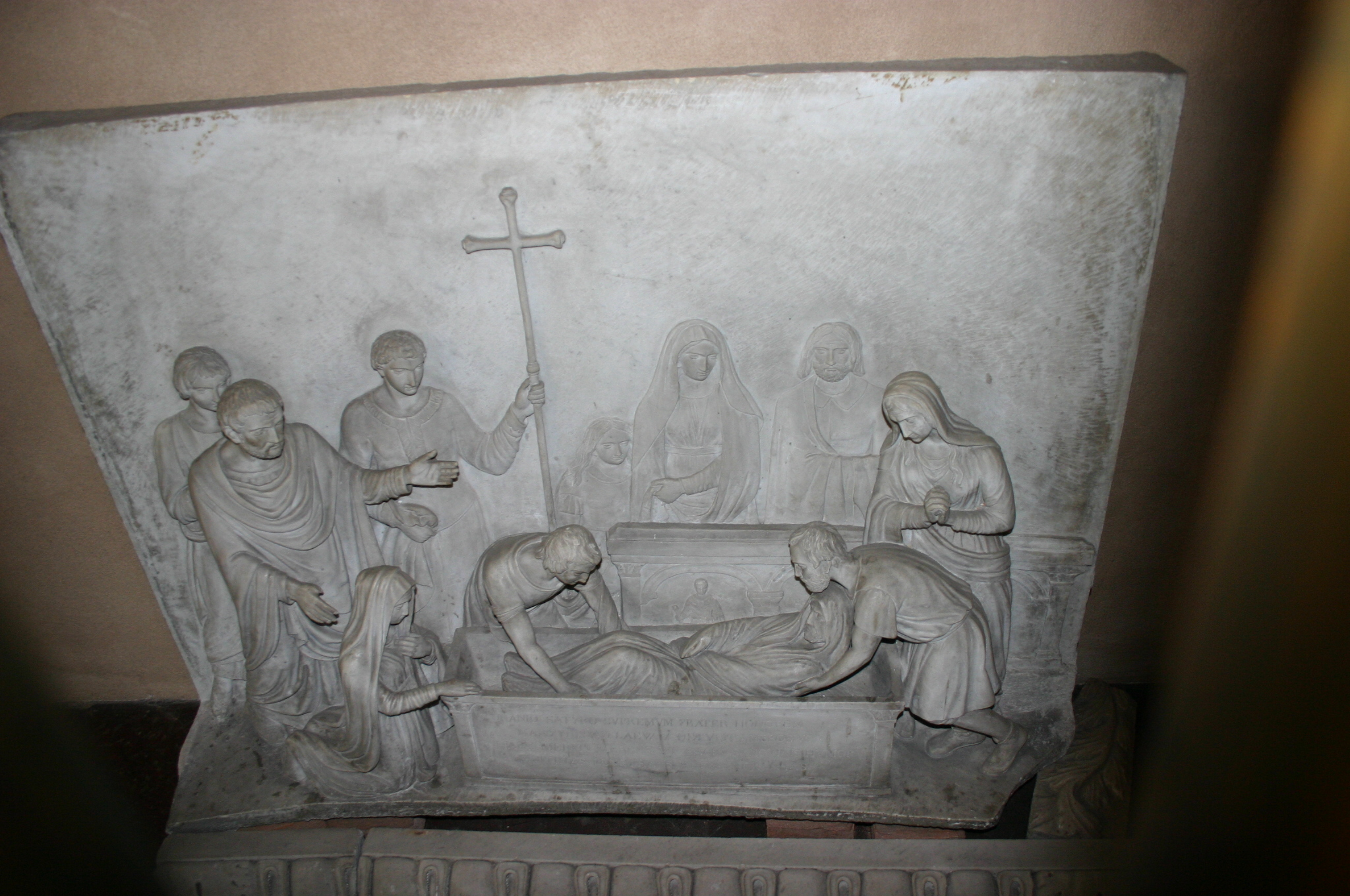
Fourth-century Christian burial depicted in relief at the Shrine of San Vittore in ciel d'oro, Basilica of Sant'Ambrogio, Milan.

The Greeks and Romans practiced both burial and cremation, with Roman funerary practices distinctly favoring cremation by the time Christianity arose during the Principate. However, the Jews only ever buried their dead. Even God himself is depicted in the Torah as performing burial: "And [God] buried him (Moses) in the depression in the land of Moab, opposite Beth Peor. No man knows the place that he was buried, even to this day." (Deuteronomy 34:6). Similarly, early Christians used only burial, as can be demonstrated from the direct testimony of Tertullian and from the stress laid upon the analogy between the resurrection of the body and the Resurrection of Christ (1 Corinthians 15:42).

In the light of the dogma of the resurrection of the body as well as of Jewish tradition, the burial of the mortal remains of the Christian dead has always been regarded as an act of religious import. It is surrounded at all times with some measure of religious ceremony.

Little is known with regard to the burial of the dead in the early Christian centuries. Early Christians did practice the use of an ossuary to store the skeletal remains of those saints at rest in Christ. This practice likely came from the use of the same among Second Temple Jews. Other early Christians likely followed the national customs of the people among whom they lived, as long as they were not directly idolatrous. St. Jerome, in his account of the death of St. Paul the Hermit, speaks of the singing of hymns and psalms while the body is carried to the grave as an observance belonging to ancient Christian tradition.

Several historical writings indicate that in the fourth and fifth centuries, the offering of the Eucharist was an essential feature in the last solemn rites. These writings include: St. Gregory of Nyssa’s detailed description of the funeral of St. Macrina, St. Augustine’s references to his mother St. Monica, the Apostolic Constitutions (Book VII), and the Celestial Hierarchy of Dionysius the Areopagite.

Probably the earliest detailed account of funeral ceremonial which has been preserved to us is to be found in the Spanish Ordinals of the latter part of the seventh century. Recorded in the writing is a description of "the Order of what the clerics of any city ought to do when their bishop falls into a mortal sickness." It details the steps of ringing church bells, reciting psalms, and cleaning and dressing the body.

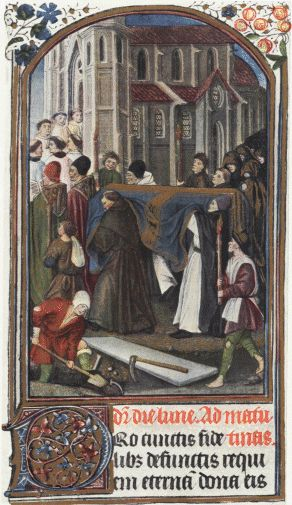
15th-century monastic funeral procession entering Old St. Paul's Cathedral, London. The coffin is covered by a blue and gold pall, and the grave is being dug in the foreground.

Traditionally, the Christian Church opposed the practice of cremation by its members. While involving no necessary contradiction of any article of faith, it is opposed alike to ancient canon law and to the usages (praxis) of antiquity. Burial was always preferred as the method of disposition inherited from Judaism and the example of Jesus' burial in the tomb. During times of persecution, pagan authorities erroneously thought they could destroy the martyrs' hope of resurrection by cremating their remains. Though the church always taught that the destruction of the earthly remains posed no threat to the bodily resurrection, many Christians risked their lives to prevent this desecration of the relics of the saints. Furthermore, the bodies of Christians were considered to have been sanctified by baptism and the reception of the sacraments, and thus were to be treated with dignity and respect, as befits a "Temple of the Holy Spirit" (1 Corinthians 3:16–17, 6:19). In reaction against the Christian opposition to cremation some have deliberately instructed that their remains be cremated as a public profession of irreligion and materialism. The revival of cremation in modern times has prompted a revision of this opposition by many Christian churches, though some groups continue to discourage the practice, provided there is no intent of apostasy or sacrilege.

During the Middle Ages a practice arose among the aristocracy that when a nobleman was killed in battle far from home, the body would be defleshed by boiling or some such other method, and his bones transported back to his estate for burial. In response, in the year 1300, Pope Boniface VIII promulgated a law which excommunicated ipso facto anyone who disembowelled bodies of the dead or boiled them to separate the flesh from the bones, for the purpose of transportation for burial in their native land. He further decreed that bodies which had been so treated were to be denied Christian burial.

=== The wake ===
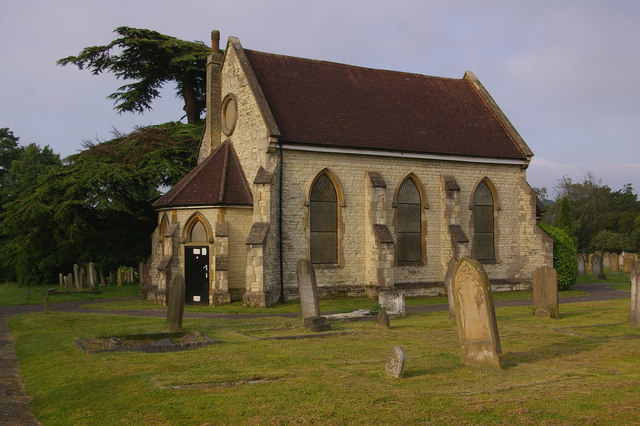
A Mortuary chapel is a building located in certain cemeteries which are used for ceremonies such as visitation before a burial.

The custom of watching by the dead (the wake) is an ancient practice probably derived from the similar Jewish custom of a pious vigil over the remains. Its origins are not entirely known. This was a Christian observance, attended with the chanting of psalms.

In the Middle Ages, among the monastic orders, the custom was practiced in a desire to perform religious duties and was seen as beneficial. By appointing relays of monks to succeed one another, orderly provision was made that the corpse would never be left without prayer.

Among secular persons, these nocturnal meetings were sometimes an occasion of grave abuses, especially in the matter of eating and drinking. The following is found in the Anglo-Saxon canons of Ælfric, addressed to the clergy:

Ye shall not rejoice on account of men deceased nor attend on the corpse unless ye be thereto invited. When ye are thereto invited then forbid ye the heathen songs (haethenan sangas) of the laymen and their loud cachinnations; nor eat ye nor drink where the corpse lieth therein, lest ye be imitators of the heathenism which they there commit.

In the earliest Ambrosian ritual (eighth or ninth century), which Magistretti pronounces to be derived from Rome, the funeral is broken up into stages: at the house of the deceased, on the way to the church, at the church, from the church to the grave, and at the grave side. But it is also clear that there was originally something of the nature of a wake (vigilioe) consisting in the chanting of the whole Psalter beside the dead man at his home.

=== Absolution ===
The Absolution became common in the second half of the eleventh century. It involves laying a form of absolution upon the breast of the deceased. This is enjoined in the monastic constitutions of Archbishop Lanfranc. Occasionally, a leaden cross etched with a few words was used for this purpose. Many such crosses have been recovered in opening tombs belonging to this period.

=== Offertory ===
The medieval ritual also included an offertory in the funeral of well known and distinguished people. Generous offerings were made in money, and in kind, in the hope of benefiting the soul of the deceased. It was also usual to lead his war-horse up the church fully accoutered and to present it to the priest at the altar rails. It would later be redeemed by a money payment.

== Western Catholic burial ritual ==
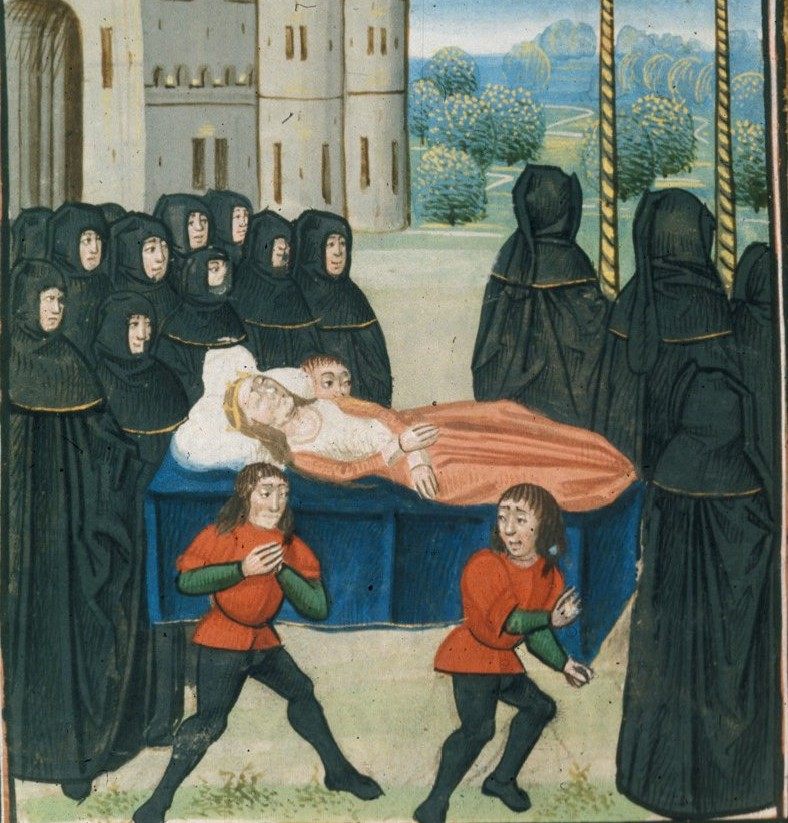
Funeral procession of Anne of Bohemia, Queen consort of England, 1394

The various Catholic religious observances surrounding mortal remains can be divided into three stages. The following three stages assume, however, that the full funeral rites are celebrated, including the Funeral (Requiem) Mass, which, since it is a Mass, must be celebrated by a priest. If a Catholic deacon celebrates, the Funeral Mass does not occur, however, a Memorial Mass may be said later for the deceased. The deacon leads the prayer services at the home and the funeral home, blesses the remains at the church during another prayer service, and then leads the prayers of final commendation at the graveside. In an increasing number of cases where there are not enough priests and deacons, lay people will lead prayers in the home of the deceased, the Vigil for the Deceased at the church, and also prayers at the graveside (the only funeral service which requires an ordained priest is the Requiem Mass itself). If the traditional three-part funeral rites are celebrated, they proceed as follows:

=== Conveyance of the body to the church ===
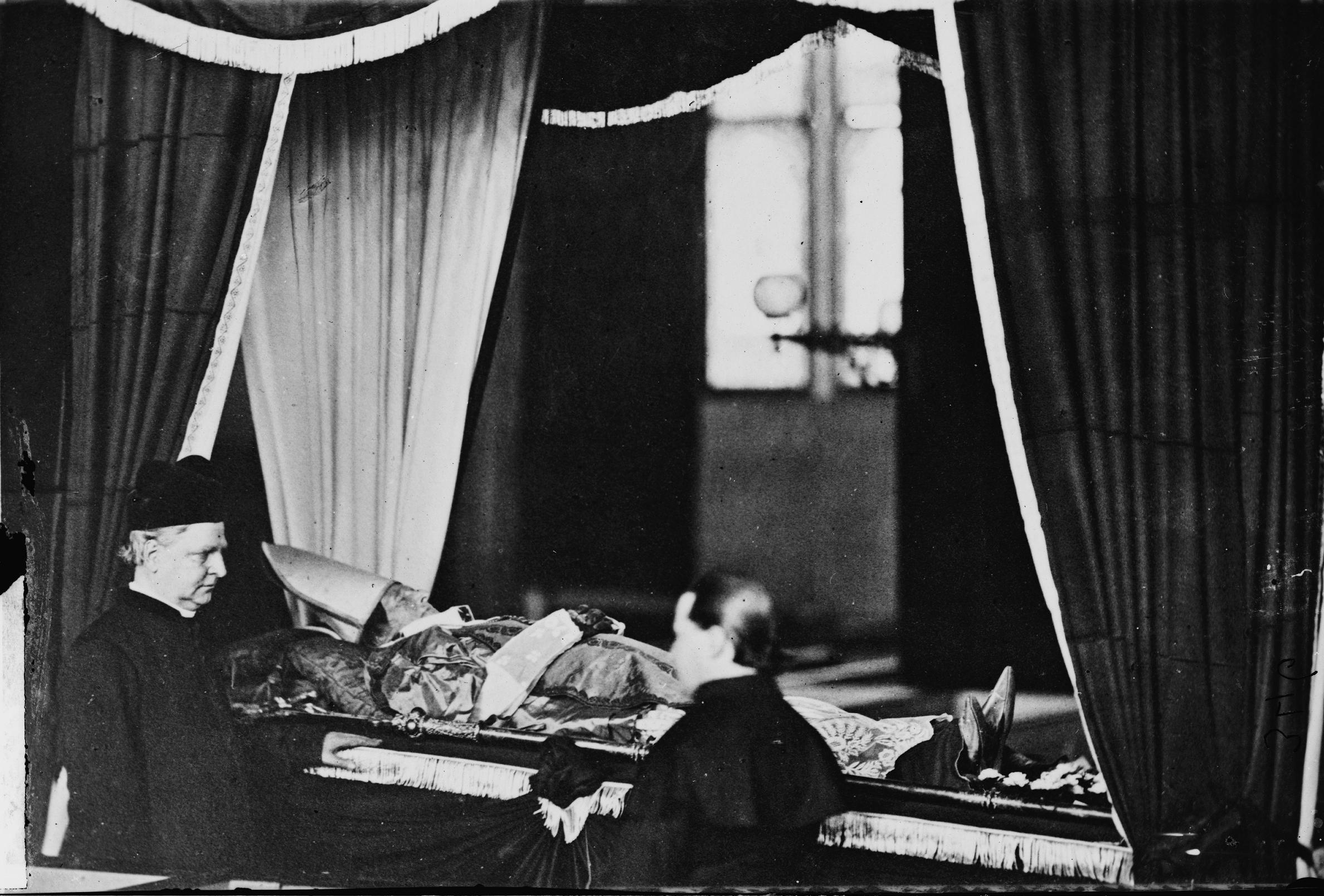
Archbishop John Hughes prepared for burial, St. Patrick's Old Cathedral, New York, 1864.

The first stage involves the parish priest and other clergy going to the house of the deceased. One cleric carries the cross and another carries a vessel of holy water. Before the coffin is removed from the house it is sprinkled with the holy water. The priest, with his assistants, says the psalm De profundis with the antiphon Si iniquitates. Then the procession sets out for the church. The cross-bearer goes first, followed by members of the clergy carrying lighted candles. The priest walks immediately before the coffin, and the friends of the deceased and others walk behind it.

Note that in the vast majority of cases none of the above will happen. The priest or deacon will go to the house without procession, or lay people will lead the prayers in the presence of the body if clergy are not available.

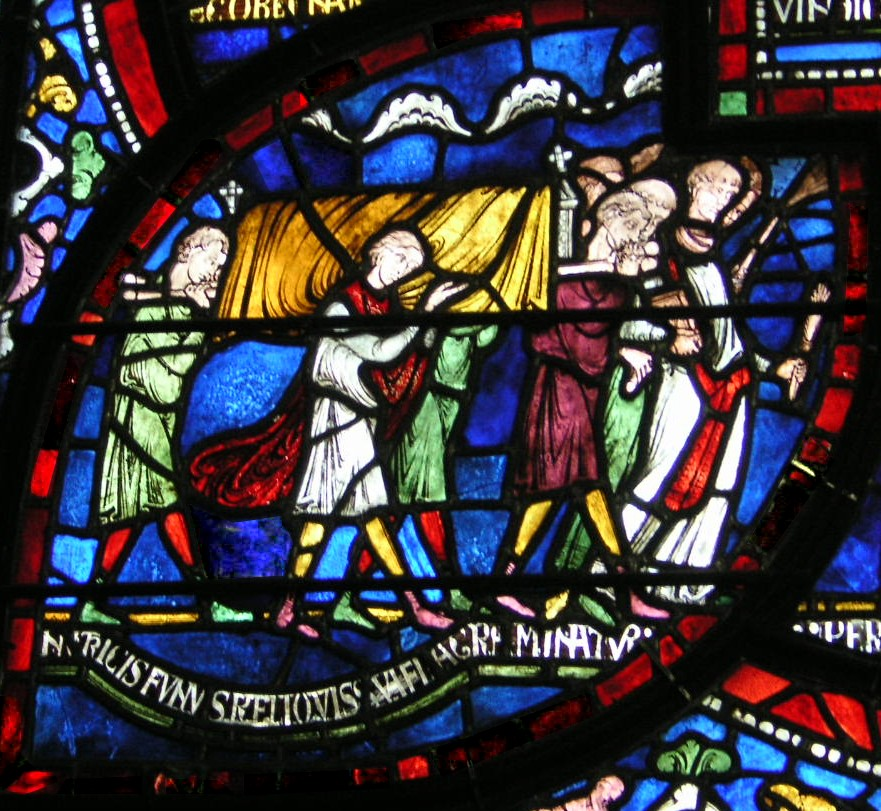
Funeral procession from the "Healing Window" at Canterbury Cathedral.

As they leave the house, the priest intones the antiphon Exsultabunt Domino, and then the psalm Miserere is recited or chanted in alternate verses by the cantors and clergy. On reaching the church the antiphon Exsultabunt is repeated. As the body is placed "in the middle of the church," the responsorial Subvenite is recited.

Once again, this seldom happens. The coffin is brought to the church by the undertaker in a hearse. It may arrive the evening before, for a Vigil in the church, or it may arrive on the day of the funeral before the service.

Historical precedence provides that if the corpse is a layman, the feet are to be turned towards the altar. If the corpse is a priest, then the position is reversed, the head being towards the altar. The earliest reference to this is in Johann Burchard's "Diary". Burchard was the master of ceremonies to Pope Innocent VIII and Pope Alexander VI.

A little-known custom also exists that both before the altar and in the grave, the feet of all Christians should be pointed to the East. This custom is alluded to by Bishop Hildebert at the beginning of the twelfth century, and its symbolism is discussed by Guillaume Durand. "A man ought so to be buried", he says, "that while his head lies to the West his feet are turned to the East…" For clergy, however, the idea seems to be that the bishop (or priest) in death should occupy the same position in the church as during life, facing his people who he taught and blessed in Christ's name. In practice, facing the east is scarcely ever observed today, but appears to have been a common custom in the early middle ages. Post-conversion cemeteries can be distinguished in England from their pre-conversion counterparts from the orientation and direction of inhumation burials. Such an example can be seen in the Chamberlain's Barn cemetery near Leighton Buzzard - around 650 CE, graves were increasingly organised into rows, facing west, and grave furnishings (commonly associated with pagan burial practices) decreased.

=== Ceremony in the church ===
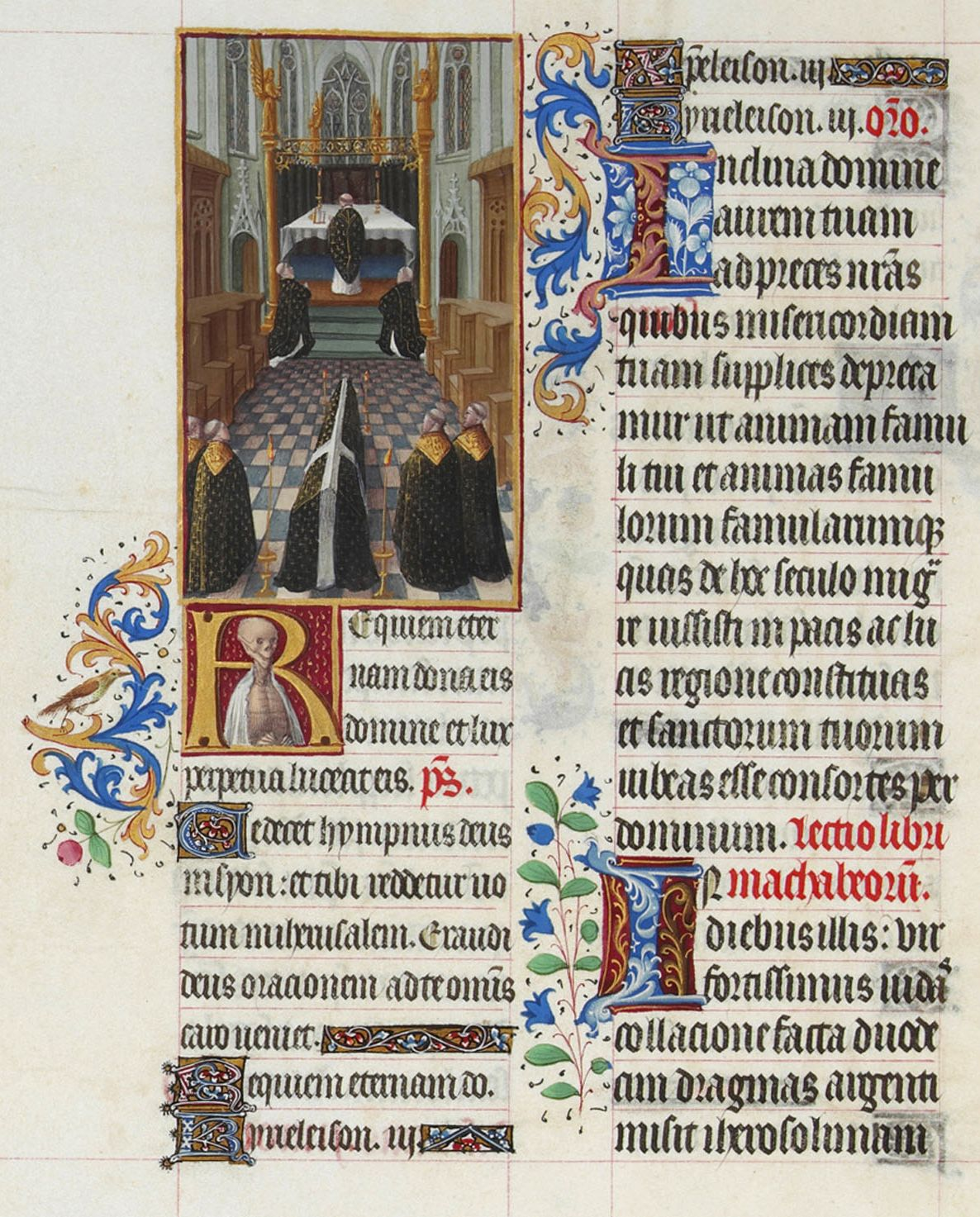
A Funeral Service, Les Très Riches Heures du duc de Berry, Folio 199v. Musée Condé, Chantilly.

The second stage is a cycle of prayers, the funeral Mass, and absolution. In the Tridentine Rite, candles are lit around the coffin, and they are allowed to burn throughout this stage. In the post-Vatican II rite there are no candles.

==== Prayers ====
The prayers offered are the Office of the Dead. Throughout the prayers, certain omissions are made. For example, each psalm ends with Requiem aeternam instead of the Gloria Patri.

==== Mass for the Dead ====
As in the case of the Office, the Mass for the Dead (Missa de Requiem) is chiefly distinguished from ordinary Masses by certain omissions. Some of these may be due to the fact that this Mass was formerly regarded as supplementary to the Mass of the day. In other cases it preserves the tradition of a more primitive age. The suppression of the Alleluia, Gloria in excelsis, and the Gloria Patri seems to point to a sense of the incongruity of joyful themes in the presence of God's searching and inscrutable judgments. In the early Christian ages, however, it would seem that the Alleluia, especially in the East, was regarded as especially appropriate to funerals, as Christians rejoiced that the deceased was now closer to God than they were themselves.

During the Mass it used to be customary to distribute candles to the congregation. These were lit during the Gospel, during the latter part of the Holy Sacrifice from the Elevation to the Communion, and during the absolution which follows the Mass. As already remarked the association of lights with Christian funerals is very ancient, and liturgists here recognize a symbolical reference to baptism whereby Christians are made the children of Light, as well as a concrete reminder of the oft repeated prayer et lux perpetua luceat eis.

Today, giving candles to the congregation is hardly ever done.

In the ordinary form of the Roman Rite (the Mass of Paul VI) the order of choice for liturgical colors is white, or violet, or black. It is recommended that the coffin be covered by a white pall. In the Extraordinary Form of the Roman Rite, the funeral Mass is a Requiem. In a Requiem Mass the priest always wears black vestments, and the pall is black. There are also slightly different ceremonies of the Mass and slightly different texts. When the deceased is a baptised child under the age of reason the priest wears white vestments as a symbol of the innocence of the deceased and the attendant belief that the child will immediately be received into heaven without the need to endure purgatory. The liturgical books for the extraordinary form have never prescribed a particular Mass for the funeral of such children, but the custom is that the votive Mass of the Angels is said.

The funeral Mass is sometimes called the "Mass of Christian Burial", "Mass of the Resurrection", or "Memorial Mass", but these terms are not found in the Order of Christian Funerals, which is the official book in the ordinary form of the Church, and should be discouraged.

==== Absolution ====
The absolution of the dead was removed from the ordinary form of the Roman Rite, and replaced with the Final Commendation and Farewell, when the new Order of Christian Funerals was promulgated following the Second Vatican Council. However, the absolution of the dead remains part of the funeral service of the Tridentine Mass.

The absolution of the dead is a series of prayers for pardon that are said over the body of a deceased Catholic following a Requiem Mass and before burial. The absolution of the dead does not forgive sins or confer the sacramental absolution of the Sacrament of Penance. Rather, it is a series of prayers to God that the person's soul will not have to suffer the temporal punishment in purgatory due for sins which were forgiven during the person's life.

During the absolution, the Libera me, Domine is sung while the priest incenses the coffin and sprinkles it with holy water. The prayer for absolution is said by the priest, and then the In paradisum is sung while the body is carried from the church.

=== Ceremony by the graveside ===
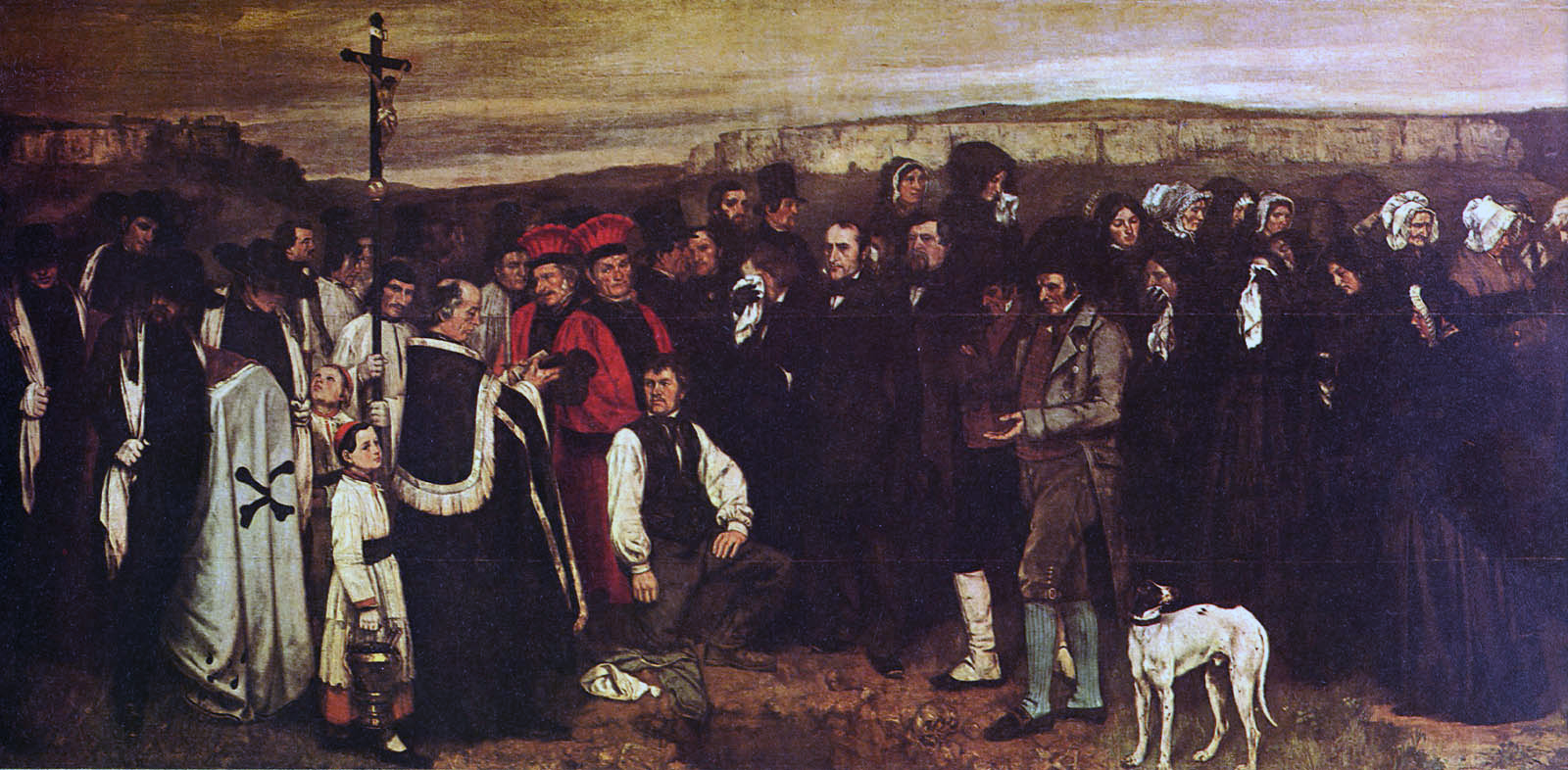
Burial at Ornans (1850, Gustave Courbet, Louvre, Paris).

After the absolution, the body is carried to the grave. The tomb or burial plot is then blessed, if it has not been blessed previously. A grave newly dug in an already consecrated cemetery is considered blessed, and requires no further consecration. However, a mausoleum erected above ground or even a brick chamber beneath the surface is regarded as needing blessing when used for the first time. This blessing is short and consists only of a single prayer after which the body is again sprinkled with holy water and incensed. Apart from this, the service at the graveside is very brief.

In the Tridentine tradition, the priest intones the antiphon "I am the Resurrection and the Life", after which the coffin is lowered into the grave and the Canticle Benedictus is recited or sung. Then the antiphon is repeated again, the Lord's Prayer is said silently, while the coffin is again sprinkled with holy water. Finally, after one or two brief responses, the following ancient prayer is said:

Grant this mercy, O Lord, we beseech Thee, to Thy servant departed, that he may not receive in punishment the requital of his deeds who in desire did keep Thy will, and as the true faith here united him to the company of the faithful, so may Thy mercy unite him above to the choirs of angels. Through Jesus Christ our Lord. Amen.

The final petition made by the priest is "May his soul and the souls of all the faithful departed through the mercy of God rest in peace." At that point, the graveside ceremony and the burial is complete.

In the post-Vatican II rite, the prayers are different.

=== Burial fees ===
In principle, there was no fee for Christian burial. According to canon law, any faithful could be buried by the priest for free; and this has been confirmed by several ecumenical councils during the Middle Ages, such as the Third (1179) and the Fourth (1215) Council of the Lateran. Charging money to conduct burials, bless a marriage or to celebrate any of the sacraments was considered as a crime of simony. Nevertheless, since the beginning of the Western Christianity, but especially after the 11th century, a considerable part of the doctrine, as well as the canon law itself, accepted a rightful compensation for the work of the minister. This compensation had to be based on local "laudable customs" or on a voluntary payment, but many parishes turned these fees into a standard scale of charges. This attitude resulted above all from the desire to strengthen parish incomes, often very small especially in rural areas. Although many critics attacked these exactions, in all Christian countries burial fees were regularly perceived by the clergy. Moreover, in contexts where parishes hosted a vestry (such as in England and France), the parishioners had to pay a certain amount to the wardens for the use of the churchyard or the church itself, when the burial took place inside it. This contribution was often called the right "for breaking the ground". After the Reformation, in both Catholic and Reformed areas, burial payments were standardized in tables of fees that had to be displayed at the entrance of the church or inside the sacristy. These tables registered also payments due for marriages, christenings, and, in some countries such as England, for the churching of women. The promulgation of tables of fees continues today in most of the Christian countries where there is an organized church.

== Protestant burials ==
Protestant burial services and rituals vary enormously between denominations.

=== Lutheran funeral ===
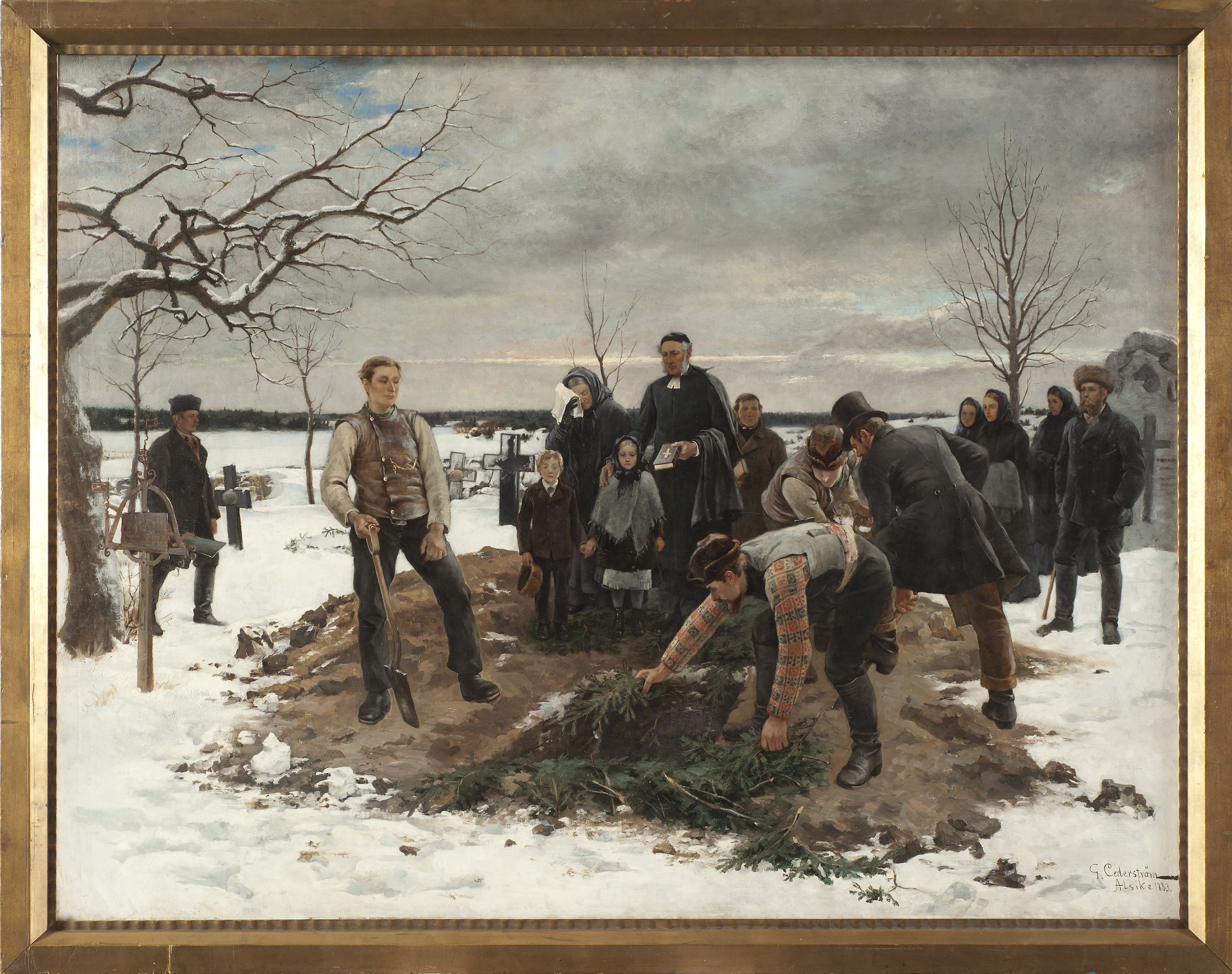
A painting by Gustaf Cederström depicting an Evangelical-Lutheran burial in Alsike, Sweden

The Lutheran Church - International stipulates that pastors preside over funerals.

=== Anglican funeral ===
In the Church of England, "Where possible the minister prepares the dying person in private, using the Preparation and Reconciliation" (cf. last rites). The Anglican Church in North America provides a liturgy, with various parts, titled "The Burial of the Dead".

=== Methodist funeral ===
Methodist denominations, such as the Methodist Protestant Church, United Methodist Church and the Methodist Church of Great Britain, have funeral liturgies that emphasize "the paschal character of Christian death and connected the last rite with baptism". To this end, the Methodist Protestant Church, in its Book of Discipline, specifies "Standing before the coffin, if the service is held in the residence, or preceding it from the entrance if the service is held in the Church", the minister recites John 11:25 and Revelation 14:13. The Order for the Burial of the Dead in the Methodist Book of Worship for Church and Home (1965) specifies that "Funeral Services of church members should be held in the sanctuary. The casket should be placed before the altar". The casket or coffin is traditionally covered with a white pall symbolizing the resurrection of Christ. The official name for the liturgy in the United Methodist Church is "A Service of Death and Resurrection"; it includes the elements found in a standard liturgy celebrated on the Lord's Day, such as the Entrance, Opening Prayer, Old Testament Reading, Psalm, New Testament Reading, Alleluia, Gospel Reading, Sermon, Recitation of one of the ecumenical creeds, prayers of the faithful, offertory, and celebration of the Eucharist, as well as the Commendation. The Commendation contains prayer for the dead, including a variation of the Eternal Rest prayer. Following this, "A Service of Committal" takes place in the graveyard or cemetery.

== Eastern Orthodox and Byzantine Catholic burial ritual ==
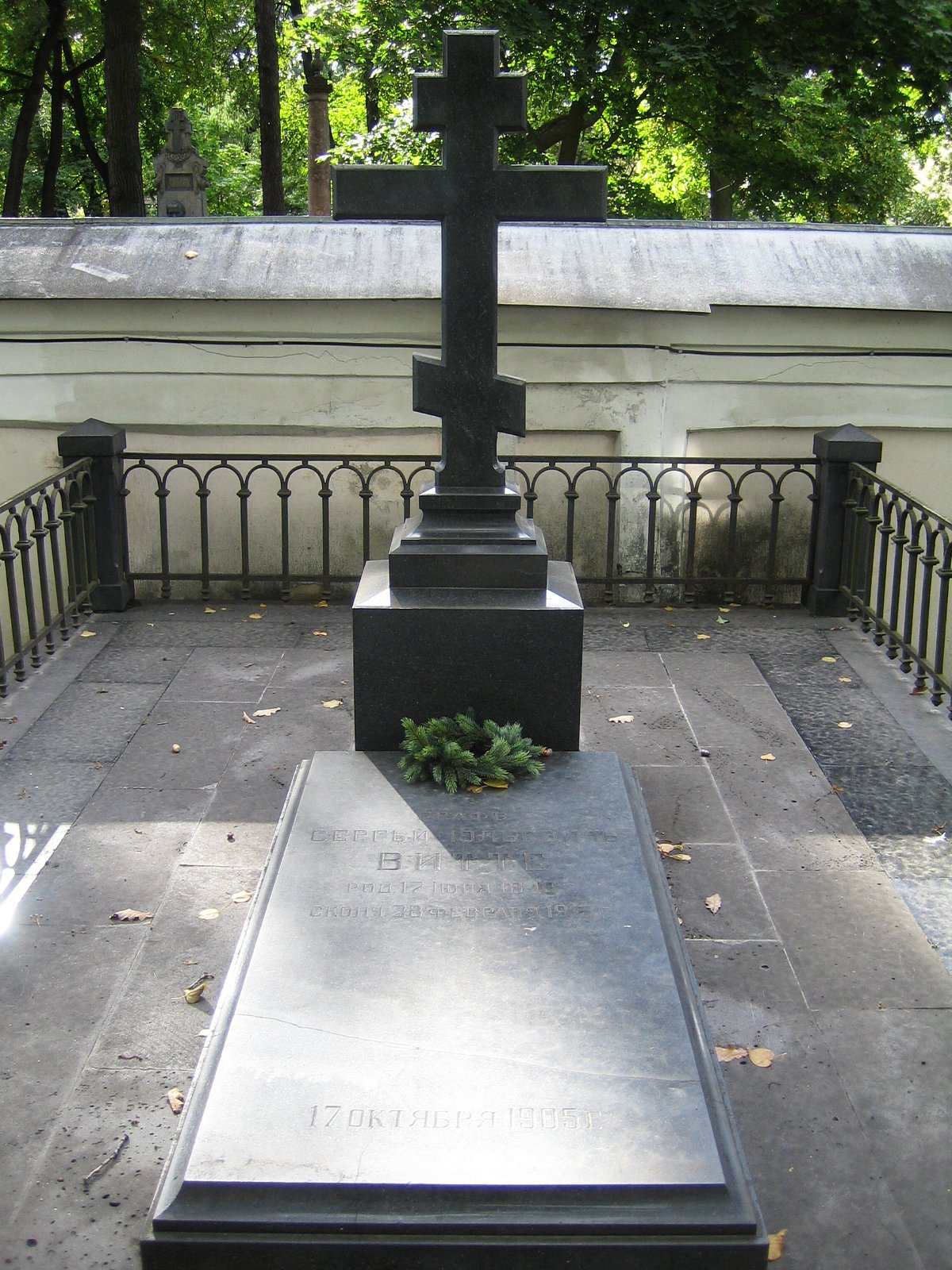
Grave of Sergei Witte, an Orthodox Christian in Lazarev Cemetery.

The full burial service of the Eastern Orthodox Church is lengthy, and there are several features unique to the Eastern Church. There are five different funeral services, depending upon the deceased's station in life: laity, children, monks, priests, and a special form served for all of the above during Bright Week (Easter week).

=== Ablutions ===
When an Orthodox Christian is preparing for death, the priest comes to hear the final confession and give Holy Communion, if the dying one is conscious (Holy Unction is not a part of Orthodox last rites). The priest then reads the Office at the Parting of the Soul from the Body, which consists of prayers and a canon to encourage repentance, and help ease the soul's transition from earthly life to the hereafter. There is a special form of this service "For One who has Suffered Long".

Immediately after death, a unique memorial service, called the "First Pannikhida" is celebrated. After this, the body is washed and clothed for burial. Traditionally, this act of love is performed by the family and friends of the deceased (Acts 9:37).

A crown (sometimes referred to as a phylactery), is placed upon the dead layman's head. This consists of a strip of paper upon which the Trisagion is written, and sometimes an icon of the Deesis is printed on it as well. A small icon of Christ, the Theotokos or the deceased's patron saint is placed in the right hand; or, alternately, a cross. A prayer rope may be placed in his left hand. If the deceased served in the military or held some other high office, he or she may be dressed in his or her uniform. If a man had been tonsured as a Reader, he will be vested in a sticharion. If he had been ordained a Subdeacon he will be vested in his sticharion and orarion. A deceased deacon is vested in sticharion and orarion, and a censer is placed in his right hand.

A monk's body is prepared by one of his brethren in the monastery. He will be clothed in his monastic habit and a prayer rope placed in his hands. If he was a Stavrophore or Megaloschema-monk he will be wrapped in his mandyas (cloak), from which two strips will be cut. These strips are wound around the body, so that they cross over the breast, the waist and the legs, thus symbolising not only the cross, but also the swaddling bands in which Jesus was wrapped as a baby, since the death of the body is considered to be a birth for the soul into new life. His klobuk will be placed backwards over his head so that the veil covers his face. Nuns are similarly arrayed.

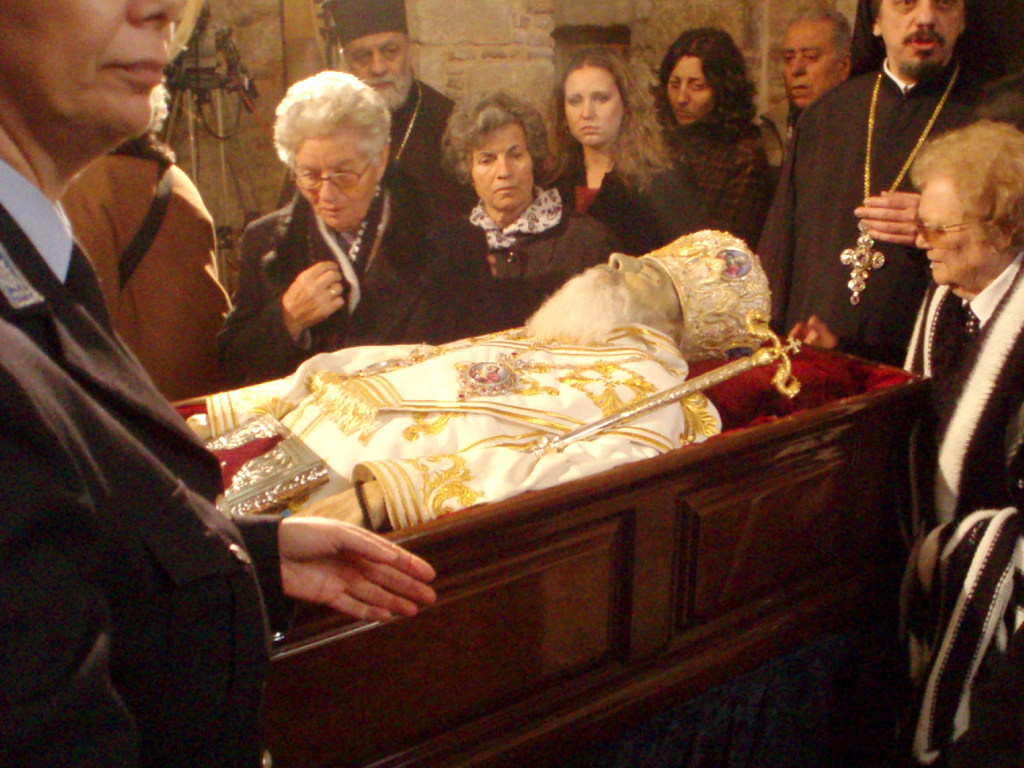
Archbishop Christodoulos of Athens laid in his coffin. His paterissa can be seen to the right, but the Aër has not yet been laid over his face.

The body of a deceased priest or bishop is prepared by the clergy, and is anointed with oil. He is then clothed in his full Eucharistic vestments (however, if he was a hieromonk he will usually be clothed in his monastic habit and be vested only in his epitrachelion [stole] and epimanikia [cuffs]). His face is covered with an Aër, the liturgical veil with which the Holy Mysteries (chalice and paten) are covered during the Divine Liturgy. Also a Gospel Book is laid upon his breast (a similar practice was found in the West in the early Spanish Ordinal).

When a bishop dies, he is vested by the clergy in his full episcopal vestments, including mitre. As each vestment is placed on him, a Protodeacon swings the censer and reads the vesting prayers, exactly as was done for him when he served the Divine Liturgy. After the vesting the bishop is set upright in a chair and the dikirion and trikirion (candlesticks used by a bishop to bless the people) are placed in his hands as the clergy chant Eis polla eti, Despota! for the final time. He is then placed in his coffin. In ancient times, and still in some places, the bishop is not placed in a coffin, but remains seated in a chair, and is even buried in a sitting position. This custom was taken from the burial customs of the Byzantine Emperors.

After the clothing of the deceased, the priest sprinkles the coffin with holy water on all four sides, and the deceased is placed in the coffin. Then the wake begins immediately. Often, an Orthodox casket will have a solid lid which is removable. The lid, with a large cross on it, is often placed outside the front door of the house as a sign that the house is in mourning, and to invite all who pass by to pray for the deceased and give comfort to the bereaved.

=== Wake ===
For Orthodox Christians the wake consists of continuous reading of the Psalter aloud, interrupted only by the occasional serving of Panikhidas (brief memorial services). Anyone is allowed to read, and the family and friends will often take turns reading the psalms throughout the night up until it is time to take the body to the church.

If the deceased was a priest or bishop the reading is done by the higher clergy (bishops, priests and deacons) and instead of reading the Psalter, they read from the Gospel Book. If there are not enough clergy to read continuously, the laity may read the Psalter at times clergy are unavailable.

=== Conveyance of the body ===
After a final Panikhida at the house of the deceased, the body is brought to the church in a procession headed by the cross and banners. The priest or deacon walks in front of the coffin with the censer. During the procession all sing the Trisagion. Bells may be rung during the procession, though they are not required by the rubrics.

Once the procession arrives at the church, the coffin is placed either in the center of the nave or, if the narthex is large enough it is placed there. Four candlestands are placed around the coffin, forming a cross. The priest censes around the coffin and begins a Panikhida. Then, the reading of the Psalter continues until the beginning of the services.

=== Ceremony ===
Monastic funeral service for Schema-Archmandrite Anastasi (Popov).

Throughout the service, upon a table close to the coffin stands a dish containing kolyva, made of wheat—symbolic of the grain which falling to the ground dies and brings forth much fruit (John 12:24)—and honey—symbolic of the sweetness of the Heavenly Kingdom. A taper is placed in the kolyva and is lit during the service.

In the Orthodox funeral, the coffin is usually open in church (unlike the West, where it is usually closed), and the lower part of the coffin is covered with a funeral pall. The lid of the casket may be left outside the church door, as an invitation to all who pass by to enter and join in the funeral.

==== Divine Liturgy for the departed ====
In some Slavic traditions, Divine Liturgy takes place as usual, with the addition of special hymns for the departed. There are also special Epistle and Gospel readings for the dead, which vary according to the day of the week on which the funeral is served. There will also be a special ektenia (litany) for the departed, and at the end another Panikhida will be served around the coffin.

==== Funeral service ====
The funeral will usually begin immediately after the dismissal of the Divine Liturgy. The funeral service is called in Greek, Pannychis, meaning vigil, and it originally lasted through the entire night and into the next morning. Today, it has been considerably shortened, but it may still last around two and a half hours.

Throughout the entire service, everyone holds lighted candles, and the censer is swung by the deacon or priest throughout much of the service.

Because death is not defeat for a faithful Christian, the Alleluia is sung as part of the service, with special funeral verses.

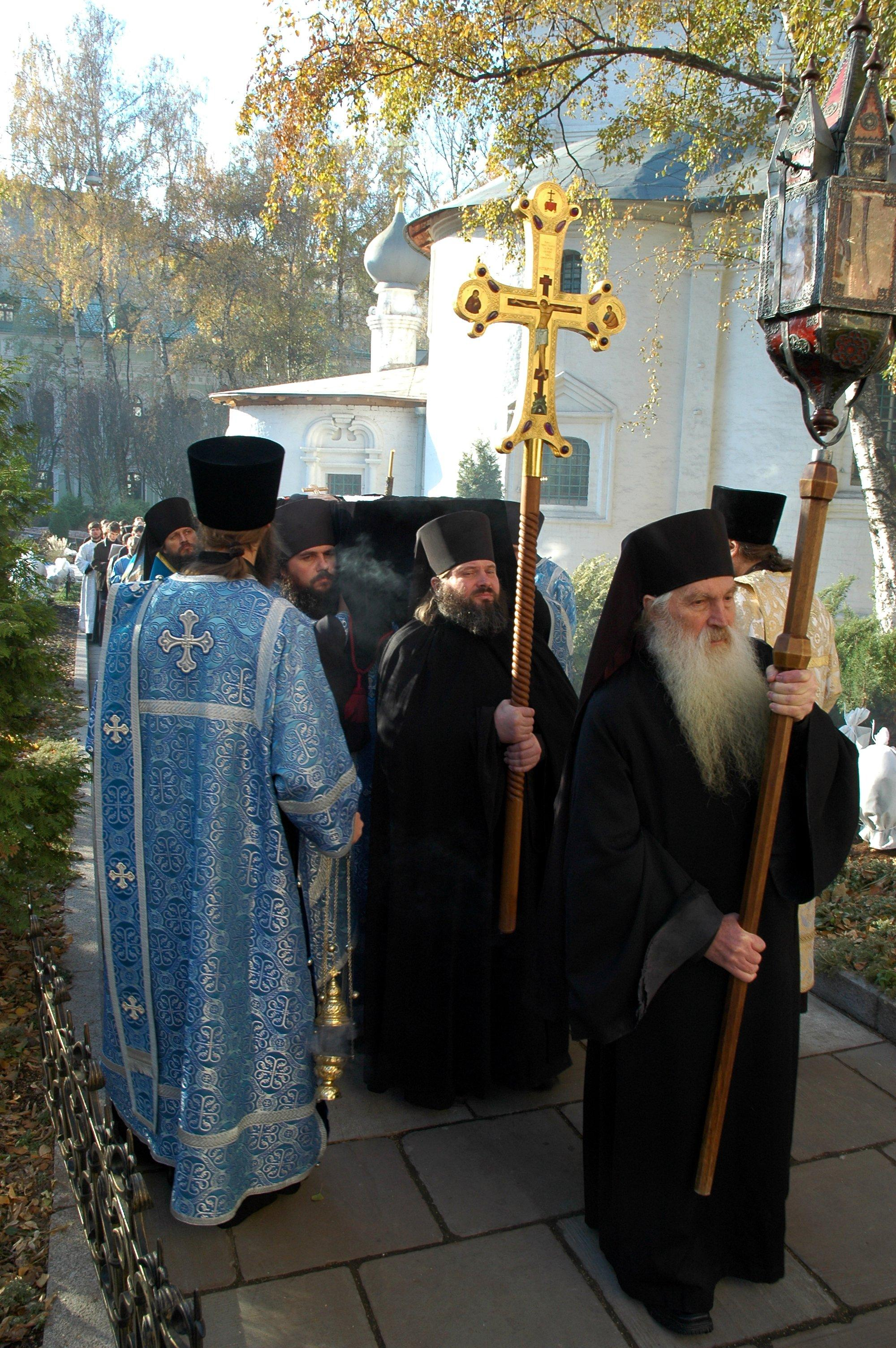
Cross procession during the burial of an Orthodox priest in Sretensky Monastery (Moscow).

As mentioned above, there are five different funeral services, all of which have different outlines:

- Laymen—This is the most common form of funeral; it is used for all adult members of the laity and for lower clergy and deacons. It is the form detailed below.
- Children—Because young children are generally not held to be morally responsible for their sins, the funeral for a child has none of the usual penitential elements, or prayers for the forgiveness of the sins of the deceased.
- Monks—The burial of monks and nuns differs in a number of respects, most noticeably that there is no canon, but rather special antiphons are chanted in all the eight tones in succession, as if recalling the monastic's participation in the whole life of the Church. This funeral is used for all tonsured monks, and for hierodeacons. Some hieromonks (priest-monks) are buried using the monastic ritual.
- Priests—When bishops and priests are buried, their funeral is different from those of laymen or monks (a hieromonk may be buried either as a monk or as a priest). Because of their important role as preachers of the Word, the funeral for priests has numerous Gospel readings in it. These are usually read from the Gospel Book which has been placed in the coffin.
- Paschal—Because of the joy and extraordinary grace of the Paschal season, any funeral performed during Bright Week (Easter week) is remarkably different from that served at any other time of year. In place of the mournful melodies and penitential nature of the normal funeral services, joyful paschal hymns are chanted. There is also a special paschal funeral for children.

Important features of the funeral service are as follows:

Psalm 118

Right at the beginning of the funeral, Psalm 118 (Septuagint numbering; KJV: Psalm 119) is chanted. In the Orthodox Psalter this is known as the 17th Kathisma, and is the longest psalm in the Bible. The psalm is divided into three sections, called Stases, the first two of which is followed by a brief Ektenia (litany) for the Dead. Each verse of the Psalm is followed by a refrain. The refrain at the first and third stases is "Alleluia", the refrain for the second stasis is "Have mercy upon Thy servant." The Kathisma is followed by a set of hymns called the Evlogitaria, which is based upon a similar Paschal hymn chanted during the Easter season and on Sunday. Thus the themes of prayer for God's mercy and of the General Resurrection are tied together.

Kontakion

The Kontakion of the Dead is one of the most moving portions of the service. It is linked to the Ikhos, another hymn which follows it. During the funeral it takes place after the Sixth Ode of the Canon. It is also chanted during panikhidas (memorial services) which are conducted both before and after the funeral:

Kontakion: With the saints give rest, O Christ, to the soul of Thy servant where there is neither sickness, nor sorrow, nor sighing, but life everlasting.

Ikhos: Thou alone art immortal, who hast created and fashioned man. But we are mortal formed of the earth, and unto earth shall we return, as Thou who madest me didst command and say unto us: Thou art dust, and to dust shalt thou return. Whither, also, all we mortals wend our way, making as a funeral dirge the song: Alleluia! Alleluia! Alleluia!

The Russian melody for this Kontakion was famously sung during the funeral scene in the movie, Doctor Zhivago.

Hymns of St. John Damascene

After the canon, the choir chants stichera that were composed by St. John Damascene. According to tradition, Saint John composed these hymns to help one of the brethren in his monastery as he grieved for a family member. There are eight stichera, each composed in one of the tones of the Octoechos. These hymns are also chanted on Friday evenings and Saturday mornings throughout the year, since Saturday is a day set aside for general commemoration of the departed.

Absolution

At the end of the funeral service, the spiritual father of the deceased will read the Prayer of Absolution, which is printed on a separate piece of paper. After the prayer, he will roll the paper up and place it in the deceased's hand.

Last kiss

Symbolic farewell is taken of the deceased by a "last kiss", during which the faithful come forward and give a last kiss of peace to the departed. Though traditions vary, often they will kiss the phylactery on the deceased's forehead and the icon or cross in his hand. During this time, the choir chants moving hymns which are intended to assist the mourners as they work through their grief and love for the deceased.

Memory Eternal

After the last kiss, the choir chants, "Memory Eternal" (Slavonic: Vyechnaya pamyat) three times, to a slow and solemn melody. If the deceased has a shroud, it is pulled over the face of the deceased. Finally, the coffin is closed. In some traditions, the priest will sprinkle a little earth on the remains, in the shape of a cross, before closing the coffin.

=== Ceremony at the graveside ===
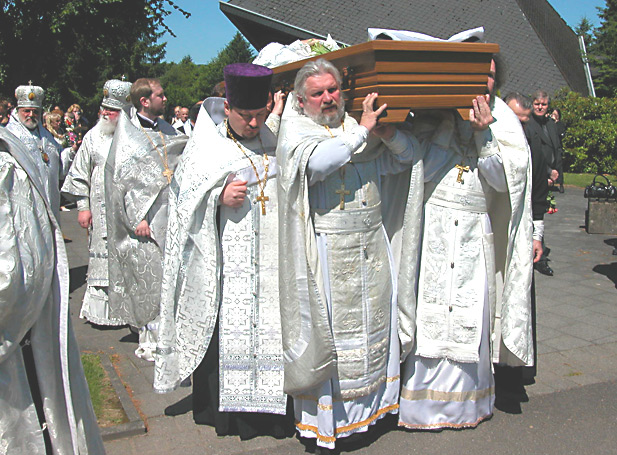
An Orthodox priest being carried to the cemetery on the shoulders of his brother priests.

A procession forms, with the cross and banners going from the church to the cemetery. This procession is similar to the one during which the body was taken to the church. If the deceased is a priest, instead of singing the Trisagion, the clergy chant the Irmoi of the "Great Canon" written by St. Andrew of Crete.

Tolling of bells

During the procession, the bells are tolled. In the Russian tradition, the funeral toll is called Perebor. Each individual bell is struck once, from the smallest to the largest, in a slow, steady peal. After that, all of the bells are struck together at the same time. Striking the bells from the smallest to the largest symbolizes the stages of a person's life from birth to death; the final striking of all the bells together symbolizes the end of this earthly life.

Committal

Upon arriving at the grave, the Panikhida is again chanted.

The coffin may be sealed with nails. Traditionally there are four nails, reminiscent of the nails with which Christ was affixed to the Cross.

As the body is lowered into the grave, the choir chants:

Open wide, O earth, and receive him (her) that was fashioned from thee by the hand of God aforetime, and who returneth again unto Thee that gave him (her) birth. That which was made according to his image the Creator hath received unto himself; do thou receive back that which is thine own.

Then the priest takes a shovelful of dirt and makes the Sign of the Cross with it in the grave, saying:

The earth is the Lord's and the fullness thereof.

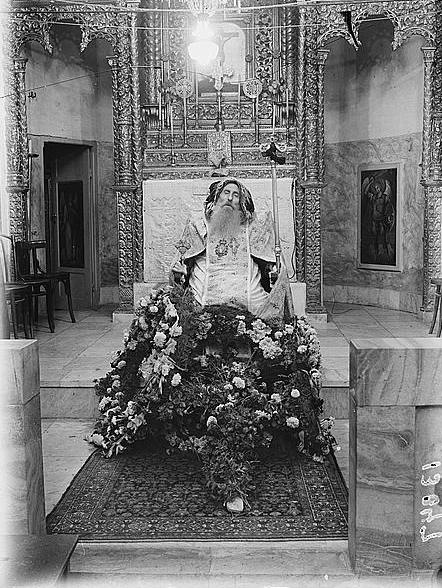
Syrian bishop seated in state at his funeral (ca. 1945).

If the deceased received the Sacred Mystery (Sacrament) of Unction, the priest will pour some of the consecrated oil on the coffin (in some places, this is done at the funeral, immediately before the coffin is closed). The priest then pours the ashes from the censer into the open grave, after which the family and friends fill in the grave as the choir chants hymns.

Orthodox Christians are buried facing east; that is to say, with their feet to the east. When a cross is placed at the grave, it is not normally placed at the head of the grave, but at the foot, so that as the faithful stand at the grave and pray facing the cross, they will be facing east, in the traditional Orthodox manner.

In the Byzantine era, bishops were buried sitting upright in a chair, a practice that is still observed in some places. After the remains were lowered into the ground, the bishop's mitre would be removed, and his monastic klobuk placed on his head so that the veil covered his face.

In the Orthodox Church, it is only permitted to celebrate a funeral for a person who is a member of the Orthodox Church in good standing. Generally speaking, funerals are not permitted for persons who have committed suicide, or who will be voluntarily cremated. In cases where the local authorities impose cremation, such as for reasons of public health, this is no obstacle to an Orthodox funeral. For those persons for whom a funeral is not allowed, the most that may be done is the chanting of the Trisagion as the body is being carried to the cemetery.

The Orthodox burial rite is discussed in several sources.

=== Mourning period ===
Orthodox Christians do not consider death to be an end, but a beginning. However, sorrow at the separation from a loved one is natural to the human condition. In Orthodox theology, Jesus' weeping for his friend Lazarus is understood as a manifestation of the fullness of his humanity (John 11:35). But Christians are taught not to grieve "even as others which have no hope" (1 Thessalonians 4:13). In the light of the Resurrection, the death of a believer is not considered to be a tragedy but a triumph. Both the funeral and the memorial services feature the singing of "Alleluia" many times.

The first traditional mourning period of Orthodox Christians lasts for forty days. During this period, certain days are considered to have special significance: the third day (on which the funeral is usually held), the ninth day, and the fortieth day. Of these three days, the fortieth is the most important, because it is believed that on that day the soul undergoes the Particular Judgment, which will determine the state of the soul until its reunification with the glorified body at the Second Coming.

For close relatives, the mourning period usually lasts for a year. During this period Panikhidas (memorial services) are served to pray for the repose of the soul of the deceased and to comfort their loved ones.

Normally, after forty days, memorials are taking place at three months, six months, nine months (terms corresponding to the Holy Trinity), at a year and in each subsequent year on the anniversary of death, for seven years in a row. It is a common practice for the friends and family to request a memorial at least on the deceased's anniversary of death. The first anniversary is almost universally celebrated, and many families will continue to request annual memorials on every anniversary of death.

=== Offerings ===
It is customary for almsgiving to be done in the name of a departed person. This not only honors their memory, but is believed to also be of spiritual benefit to them.

The departed are also commemorated regularly during the Proskomedie of the Divine Liturgy. The name of the departed is given to the priest, who then removes a particle of bread from the prosphoron (loaf of bread) offered for the Liturgy. In the Russian usage, there is a separate prosphoron for the departed, from which these memorial particles are taken. After the consecration, these particles are placed in the chalice, and the church teaches that the departed benefit spiritually from this action more than any other on their behalf.

=== Consecration of a cemetery ===
In the Orthodox Church there is a ritual for the consecration of a cemetery, found in the Euchologion (Church Slavonic: Trebnik). A large cross is erected in the center of the cemetery. The ritual begins with the Lesser Blessing of Waters. Then the cross and the entire property are consecrated with prayers, incense and the sprinkling of holy water.

Persons for whom a funeral service may not be chanted (see paragraphs above) may not be buried in a consecrated cemetery without the blessing of the local bishop.

If it is not possible to bury an Orthodox Christian in a consecrated cemetery, the individual grave may be consecrated, using the rite called the "Blessing of a Grave".

== Burial confraternities ==
Even from the period of the catacombs such associations seem to have existed among the Christians and they no doubt imitated to some extent in their organization the pagan collegia for the same purpose.

Throughout the Middle Ages the guilds to a very large extent were burial confraternities; at any rate the seemly carrying out of the funeral rites at the death of any of their members together with a provision of Masses for his soul form an almost invariable feature in the constitutions of such guilds.

Certain organizations were formed to carry out the burial of the dead and friendless as a work of charity. The most celebrated of these was the "Misericordia" of Florence, believed to have been instituted in 1244 by Pier Bossi, and surviving to the present day. It is an organization which associates in this work of mercy the members of all ranks of society. Their self-imposed task is not limited to escorting the dead to their last resting-place, but they discharge the functions of an ambulance corps, dealing with accidents as they occur and carrying the sick to the hospitals. When on duty until recently the members wore a hood which completely disguised them.

== See also ==
- Veneration of the dead
- Fate of the unlearned
- Funerary art
- Cemetery
- Cremation
- Requiem
