= Mandias =

Mandias may refer to:

- Mantle (vesture)
- Mandias, a fictional House Corrino emperor in the Dune universe
