= Q75 =

Q75 may refer to:

- Q75 (New York City bus)
- Al-Qiyama, a surah of the Quran
- French submarine Watt
- Hyampom Airport, in Trinity County, California, United States
