= Universal opportunity =

Universal opportunity, in Christian theology, describes the belief that God offers opportunities for salvation to all human beings.

These opportunities can consist of human evangelists, the Bible, and churches. Believers in universal opportunity also theorize that God may offer supernatural opportunities, such as visions or dreams, to those who fail to encounter ordinary opportunities.

== See also ==
- Fate of the unlearned
- Future probation
- Invincible error
- Vincible ignorance
- Willful blindness
