= Pall (funeral) =

Cloth which covers a casket or coffin during the funeral, often of rich materials

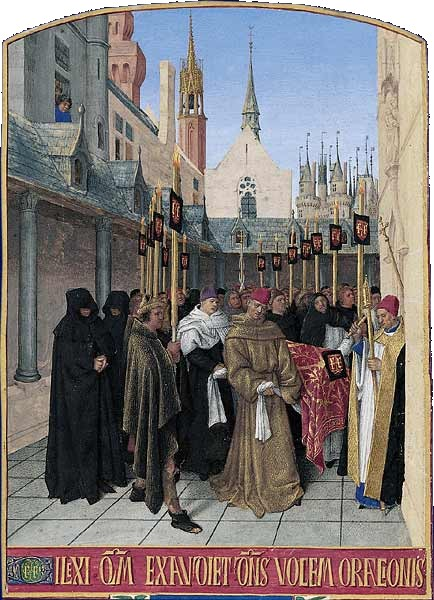
A funeral procession arriving at a church. The coffin is covered with an elaborate red and gold pall. From the Hours of Étienne Chevalier by Jean Fouquet

A pall (also called mortcloth or casket saddle) is a cloth that covers a casket or coffin at funerals. The word comes from the Latin pallium ('cloak'), through Old English. A pall or palla is also a stiffened square card covered with white linen, usually embroidered with a cross or some other appropriate symbol. The purpose of this pall is to keep dust and insects from falling into the Eucharistic elements in a chalice. The derivation is the same: the cloth is named after the presumed cloth that covered the body of Jesus.

The use of a rich cloth pall to cover the casket or coffin during the funeral grew during the Middle Ages; initially these were brightly coloured and patterned, only later black, and later still white. They were usually then given to the Church to use for vestments or other decorations.

The rules for the pall's colour and use vary depending on religious and cultural traditions. Commonly today palls are pure white, to symbolize the white clothes worn during baptism and the joyful triumph over death brought about by the Resurrection. The colour is not fixed, though, and may vary with the liturgical season. Traditionally, it is common for the pall, as well as the vestments of the clergy to be black. The pall will often be decorated with a cross, often running the whole length of the cloth from end to end in all four directions, signifying the sovereignty of Christ's triumph over sin and the Crucifixion.

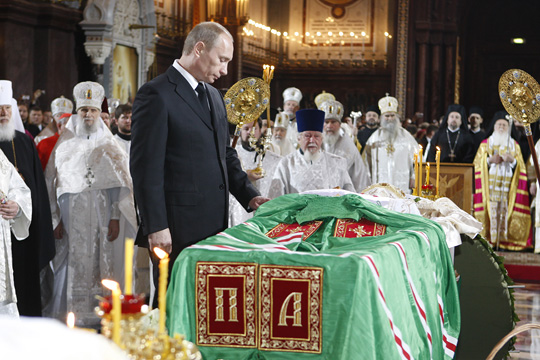
The funeral of Patriarch Alexy II of Moscow. The patriarchal mandyas is draped over his casket as a pall. President Vladimir Putin is seen paying his respects at the coffin.

The pall is placed on the casket or coffin as soon as it arrives at the church and will remain on the coffin during all of proceedings in the church. If the family members wish to view the deceased, this would normally be done previously at the funeral home before the casket or coffin is brought to the church; but customs will vary from denomination to denomination. The pall will be removed at the graveside, just before the casket or coffin is lowered into the ground. If the remains are to be cremated, the pall-covered casket or coffin will go through a curtain, and the pall will be removed.

In the Eastern Orthodox Church the pall often bears a depiction of the cross and instruments of the Passion as well as the text of the Trisagion hymn. Since Orthodox funerals are normally open casket, the pall comes up only to the chest of the deceased. When an Orthodox bishop dies, his mandyas (mantle) is used as a pall.

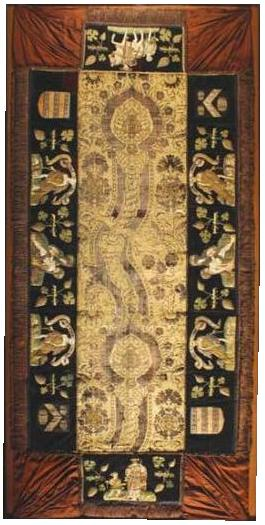
Hearse-cloth presented in 1539 to the Worshipful Company of Vintners in the City of London by its master John Husee.

Military funerals often use the nation's flag as a pall. In the United Kingdom, members of the Royal Family or the peerage may use a flag bearing their arms as a pall, as seen for example at the funeral of Queen Elizabeth the Queen Mother. The City of London Livery Companies have collections of often magnificently embroidered "hearse-cloths", which were from the 16th century traditionally donated by prominent members for use in covering distinguished members' coffins. An exhibition of such palls was made in the Victoria and Albert Museum in London in 1927.

== See also ==
- Shroud
- Christian burial
