= Eagle rug =

Small rug that bishops stand on during services

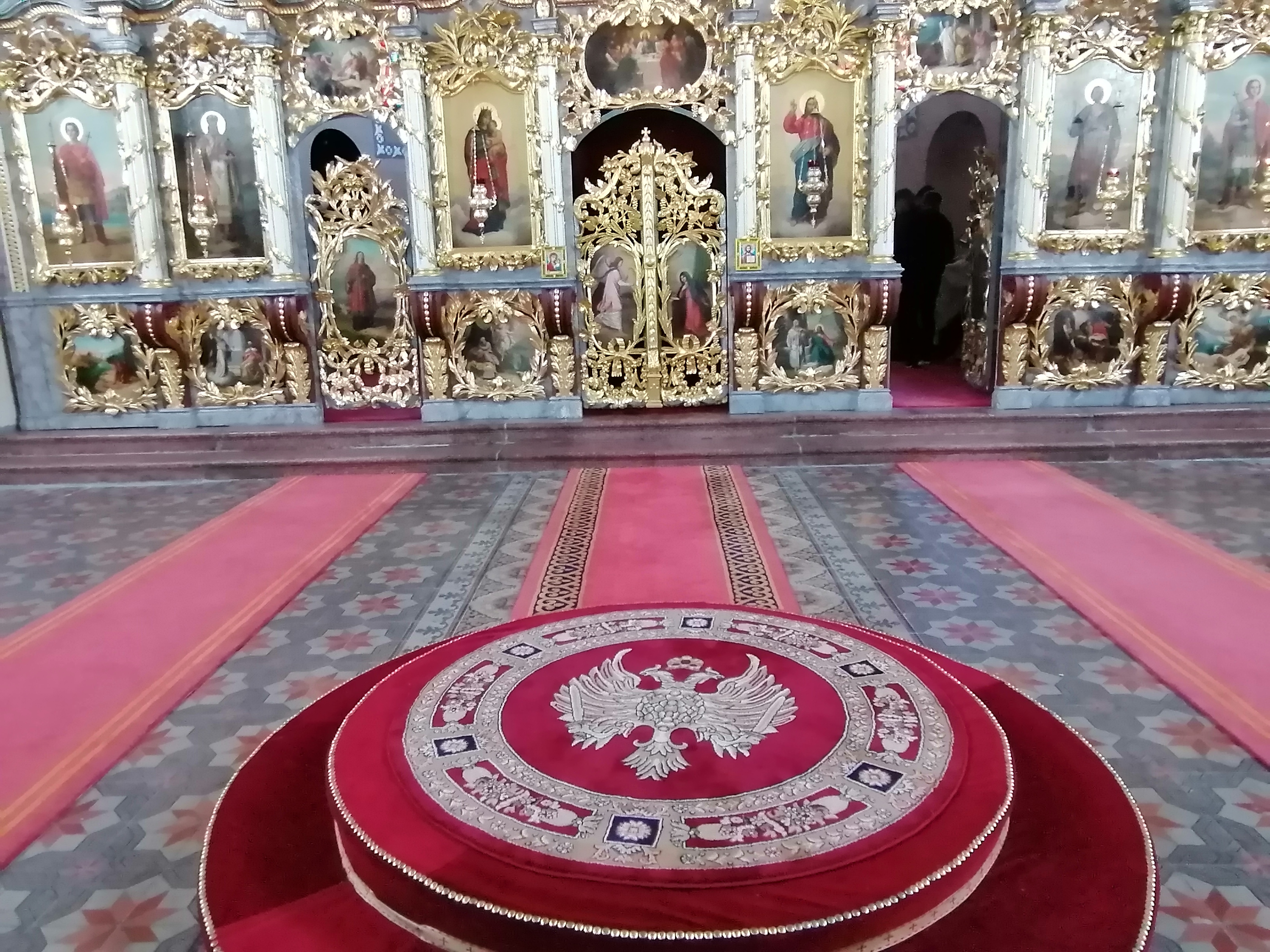
An eagle rug in the Serbian Orthodox Church in Belegiš

An Eagle rug (Greek αετός, aëtos; Church-Slavonic орлецъ, orlets) is a small rug, usually round, upon which Byzantine Rite bishops stand during divine liturgy and other services.

The Orlets ("Eaglet") is a small round or oval rug, whereon is represented an eagle, with a glory around his head, flying above a city. During divine service, the bishop stands on such rugs, as a reminder that he should, by his teaching and his life, rise above his flock, and be to them an example of a soul aspiring from the things of earth to those of heaven.

== Appearance ==
The eagle rug is normally woven or embroidered so as to depict an eagle soaring over a city that is surrounded by walls and towers. The walled city represents the bishop's episcopal authority over his Diocese, and his defence of the faithful in it. The eagle soaring above the city represents the bishop's uprightness of life, and his sound theological preaching of the Gospel, which should soar above all worldliness and elevate the hearts and minds of the faithful. Around the eagle's head is a halo, in imitation of the eagle used to depict St. John the Divine, and symbolizing theological attainments and the grace of the Holy Spirit. The eagle is also a reminder that, "as an eagle can see clearly over distances, so must a bishop oversee all parts of his diocese."

== Use ==
Any time a bishop is present in the church, or functioning at some service outdoors—whether vested and serving or whether simply wearing the mantle—he stands on an eagle rug. During the Hierarchical Divine Liturgy many eagle rugs are used, there always being one where he is seated or standing, and before he moves to a spot (such as on the Ambo) to give a blessing, an eagle rug is placed there for him to stand on as he blesses. The eagle rug placed at the bishop's cathedra is slightly larger than the others used during the services. The eagle rug is always placed so that the head of the eagle faces the direction the bishop is facing.

== Special Form ==
Before his consecration, a bishop-elect is led onto a very large eagle rug, used specifically for this purpose, as the consecrating bishops examine him regarding his faith.
