= Future probation =

Future probation is an eschatological question about the fate of the dead in the afterlife in Christianity. The question is whether salvation is possible after death, and whether eternal life may similarly be gained after the time of death. The general scope of the subject encompasses many variants that range from the Catholic doctrine of invincible ignorance through Mormon practices of postmortem baptism.

== See also ==
- Fate of the unlearned
- Universal opportunity
- Vincible ignorance
- Willful blindness
