= Righteous gentile =

Righteous gentile may refer to:

- Noachide, a gentile who follows the Seven Laws of Noah
- Ger toshav, ("resident alien") gentile (non-Jew) living in the Land of Israel who follows the Seven Laws of Noah
- Righteous Among the Nations, an honorific bestowed by the State of Israel to non-Jews who risked their lives to save Jews from the Nazis
