= Evlogitaria =

The Evlogitaria (Greek: Ευλογητάρια, meaning "blessed") are troparia sung after the reading of the Psalter. There are two evlogitaria, one is the "Evlogitaria of the Resurrection", sung at Sunday matins, while another is the "Evlogitaria of the Dead", sung at funerals. The refrain in English is "Blessed are You, O Lord, teach me your statutes."

== See also ==
- Troparion
- Resurrection of Jesus
- Byzantine Chant
- Znamenny Chant
