= Mantle (monastic vesture) =

Ecclesiastical overgarment

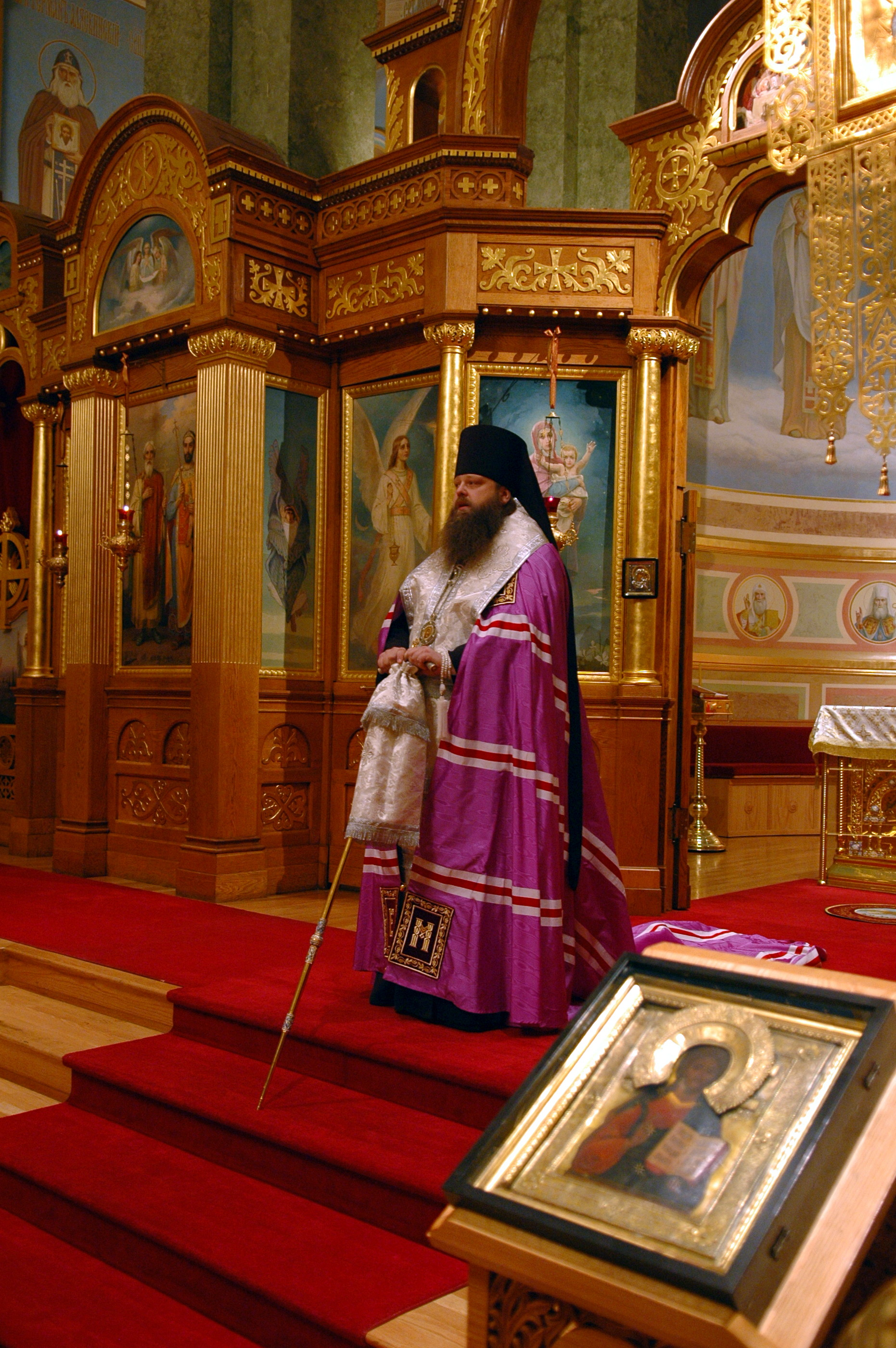
Bishop Mercurius of Zaraysk wearing the episcopal mantle (St. Nicholas Russian Orthodox Cathedral, Manhattan).

A mantle (Koine Greek: μανδύας, romanized: mandyas; Church Slavonic: мантия, romanized: mantiya) is an ecclesiastical garment in the form of a very full cape that extends to the floor, joined at the neck, that is worn over the outer garments. Especially in the case of Elijah, it was likely a tallit, a Hebrew garment that housed the fringes still seen today which are also translated at "the hem of His garment" in the New Testament. It is also likely that further ecclesiastical garments were based originally on this one.

In the Eastern Orthodox Church and the Catholic Church, the mantle is a monastic garment worn by bishops, hegumens, archimandrites, and other monastics in processions and while attending various church services, such as Vespers or Matins; but not when vested to celebrate the Divine Liturgy. Unlike the Western cope, the mantle is worn only by monastics. The klobuk is worn over the mantle.

Christian knights, many of whom take monastic vows, wear a mantle as well, often containing Christian symbols. Knights of the Order of the Holy Sepulchre, for example, wear a white mantle with a Jerusalem cross that represents the Five Holy Wounds of Jesus.

== History ==
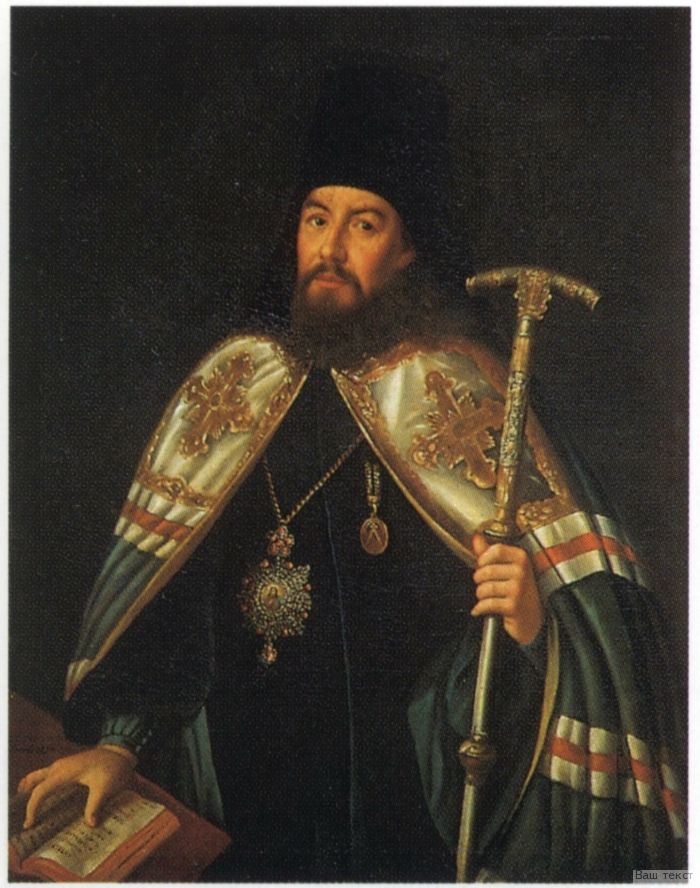
Portrait of archbishop Gabriel (Petrov) wearing an episcopal mandyas (Alexey Andropov, 1774, State Russian Museum, Saint Petersburg).

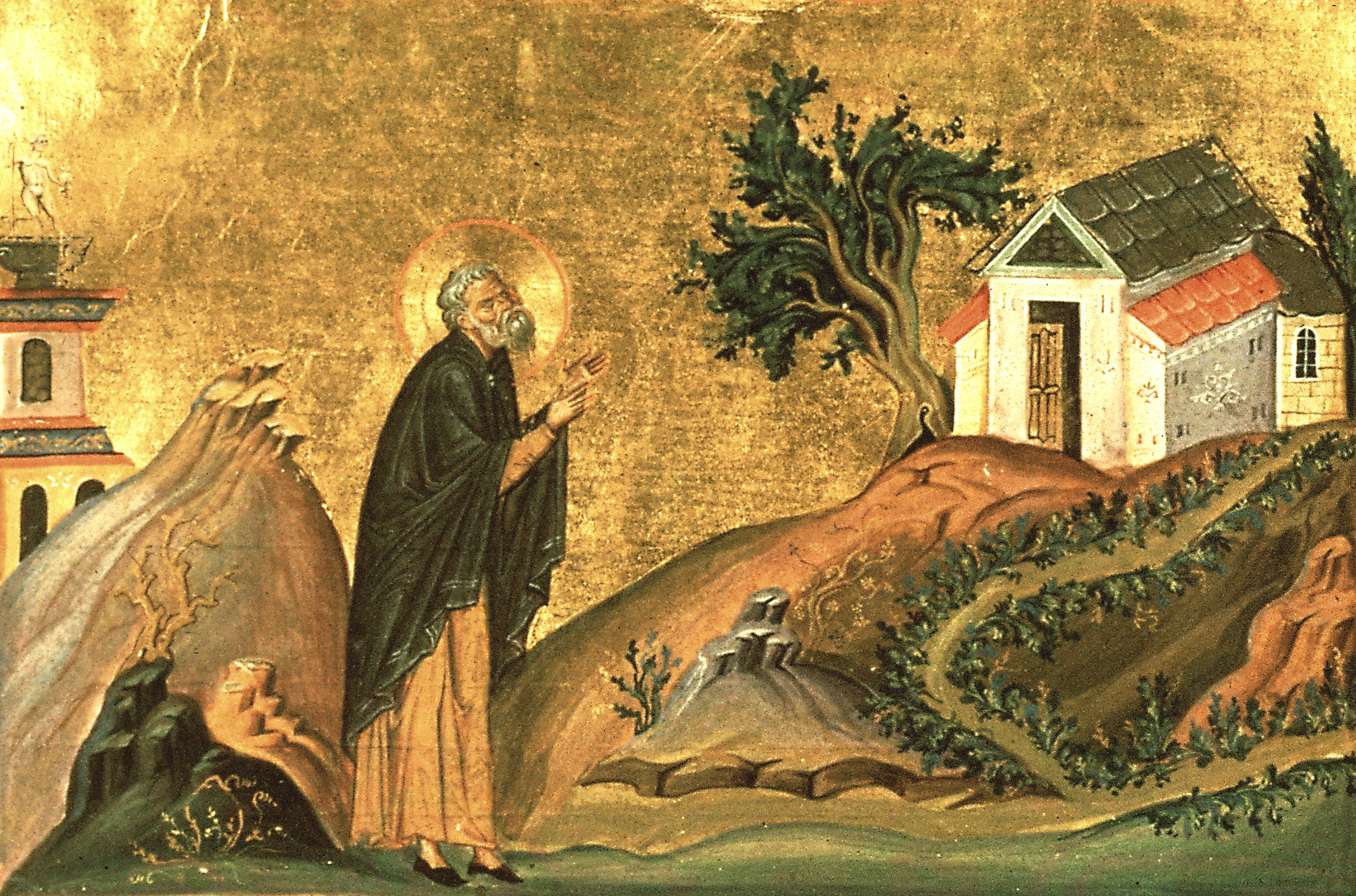
Painting of the monk Isidore of Pelusium, wearing a black mantle, from the Menologion of Basil II, 11th Century.

The mantle was originally a cape worn simply to ward off the cold. The mantle was first mentioned in the Old Testament, as a garment worn by several prophets including Elijah and Elisha. In 2 Kings 2:11–14, the mantle passing from Elijah the prophet, to Elisha, his successor, symbolizes the passing of prophetic authority:

And it came to pass, as they still went on, and talked, that, behold, there appeared a chariot of fire, and horses of fire, and parted them both asunder; and Elijah went up by a whirlwind into heaven.
And Elisha saw it, and he cried, My father, my father, the chariot of Israel, and the horsemen thereof. And he saw him no more: and he took hold of his own clothes, and rent them in two pieces.
He took up also the mantle of Elijah that fell from him, and went back, and stood by the bank of Jordan;
And he took the mantle of Elijah that fell from him, and smote the waters, and said, Where is the LORD God of Elijah? and when he also had smitten the waters, they parted hither and thither: and Elisha went over.

Depictions of monks on icons show the mantle in use from the earliest Christian times. The original monastic mantle was of simple material: black, brown or grey, depending on what was at hand. As time went on, the use of mantles of a particular color and style came to be established as specific monastic vesture. Over the years distinguishing colors and ornamentation came to be applied to the mantle to distinguish monastics of higher positions within the church, while still reminding them of the need for monastic humility.

In the contemporary practice of the Eastern Orthodox Church, monks and nuns wear solid black mantles. They also wear veils, differing between traditions and rank. In common practice, monks wear a black veil that covers a Kalimavkion, a cylindrical hat. Abbesses also wear this same veil and hat while nuns only wear the veil. The practice of wearing a kalimavkion below the veil has only arisen in the last 300 years, and prior to this period, monks either wore no veil, or wore a pointed veil, as seen in many Russians of the old rite and icons of African saints. Nuns have been wearing a veil, in addition to the mantle since at least the 11th Century.

== Monastics ==
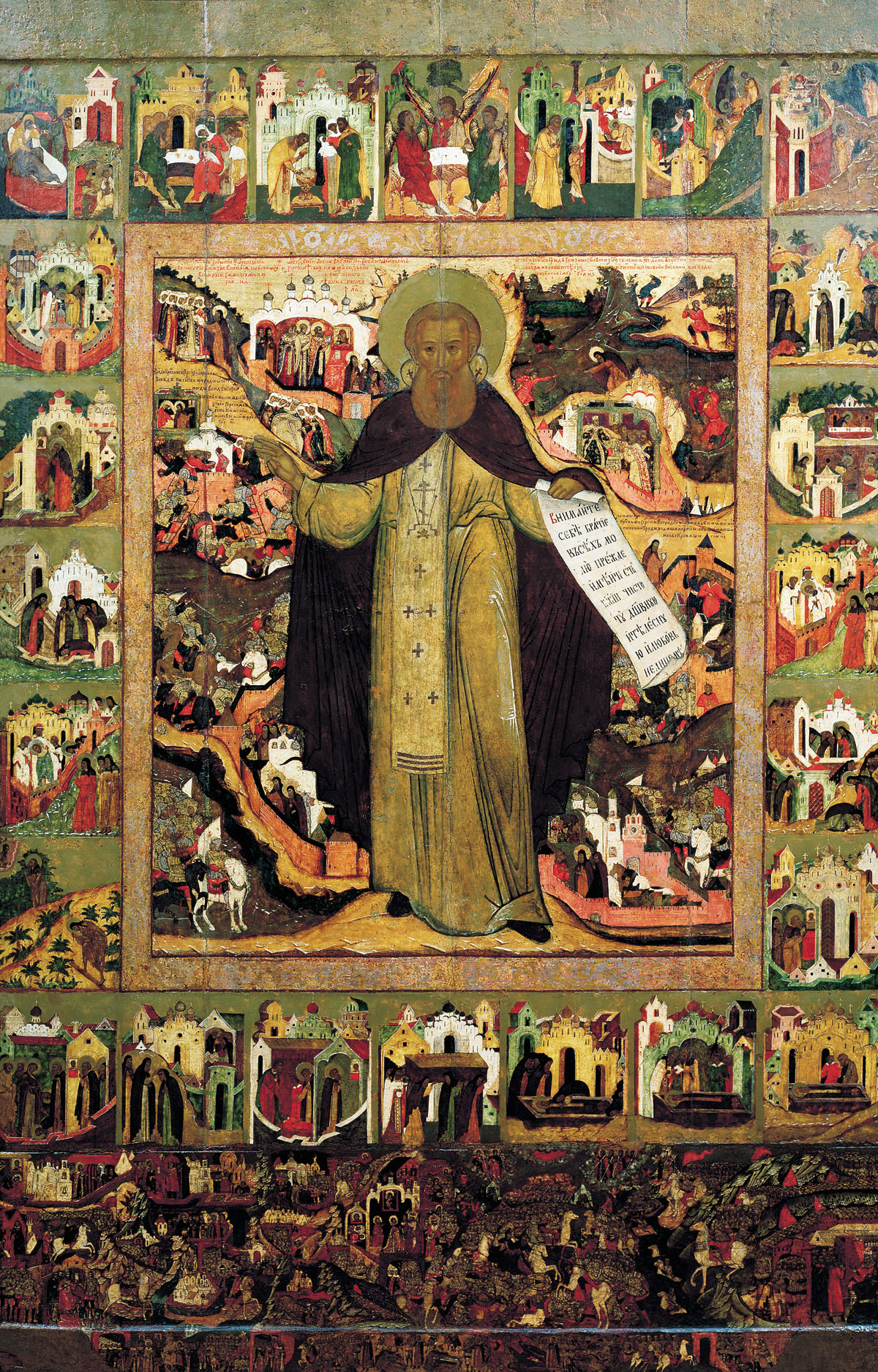
Icon of Saint Sergius of Radonezh wearing the black monastic mantle.

The monastic mantle is worn by Orthodox Christian monks and nuns of the Lesser Schema and Great Schema. In the Greek practice the use of the mantle by those of the Lesser Schema is less common. (It is not worn by Rassaphores). The mantle worn by a simple monk or nun is black (black being the traditional monastic color, symbolizing mourning over one's sins and a reminder of the vow of poverty), joined at the neck and hanging down to the feet. In the Russian tradition, the mantle is usually pleated (33 pleats for the number of years in the earthly life of Jesus). It may or may not have a train. Over the centuries, much symbolic meaning has come to be attributed to the mantle:

"[The] mantle is a monastic vestment, which covers the whole person with the exception of the head. Its freely flowing lines typify the wings of the Angels; hence it is called "the Angelic vestment." The folds of the Mantle are symbolical of the all-embracing power of God; and also of the strictness, piety and meekness of the monastic life; and that the hands and other members of a monk do not live, and are not fitted for worldly activity, but are all dead."

"[The mantle] is called 'the garment of incorruption and purity' [in the text of the Tonsure ceremony], and the absence of sleeves is to remind the monk that he is debarred from worldly pursuits. The mantle is given him in token of the 'exalted angelic state' which he assumes"

The mantle is bestowed upon a monk when he becomes as Stavrophore (Lesser Schema), for which reason this rank of monk is sometimes referred to as a "mantle monk". The mantle is bestowed a second time if he becomes a Schemamonk (Greater Schema).

An Hegumen (Abbot) or Hegumenia (Abbess) wears the simple monastic mantle.

When an Orthodox monk or nun dies, they are vested in their religious habit. A strip of cloth is torn from the bottom of their mantle and is used to bind their body three times: around the chest, around the waist, and around the feet.

== Archimandrites ==
The mantle worn by an archimandrite will be joined in front at the bottom as well as at the neck, and will have "tablets" or "pectorals" (Greek: πόματα, pómata; Slavonic: skrizhali)—rectangular pieces of red or green cloth sewn onto the corners of the mantle (i.e., two at the neck and two at the feet). The upper two tablets (those at the neck) will often be embroidered with crosses. The tablets symbolize the fact that the Archimandrite will guide the brethren according to the commandments of God. The four tablets are symbolic of the Old and the New Testaments, and of the Four Gospels.

When an archimandrite dies, his mantle is laid on his coffin in place of a funeral pall.

== Bishops ==
There is also an episcopal mantle which is not worn with the other episcopal vestments while celebrating the Divine Liturgy, but when the bishop formally enters the church beforehand, or when a bishop is formally attending (i.e., presiding over) a service in which he is not serving. Among the Greeks, it is common for all bishops regardless of rank, to wear a red mantle; however, many also use purple during Great Lent. In the Slavic tradition, a more complex color scheme has developed, and hierarchs wear different-colored mantles according to their rank: violet for bishops; plum for archbishops; blue for metropolitans; and green for patriarchs in the Russian tradition. Different national churches have different traditions regarding the colors worn by bishops.

In the Russian tradition, the episcopal mantiya is characteristically decorated with red and white horizontal ribbons, called "rivers" or "streams" (Greek: ποταμοί, potamoí; Slavonic: Istochniki), symbolizing the word of God going out into the entire world (Ezekiel 47:1–12, John 7:38, Revelation 22:1). Among the Greeks, these rivers are usually gold.

The tablets on the Bishop's mantle may be more finely embroidered or made of more costly material than those on the mantle of an archimandrite. The upper tablets (those at the neck) may be embroidered with icons; those at the feet may be embroidered with the bishop's monogram. The episcopal tablets symbolise the four Gospels which must be the focus of a bishop's teachings. The episcopal mantle always has a train on it, and may have small bells attached as well, recalling the bells attached to the Robe of the High Priest (Exodus 28:33–34).

In general, when a bishop celebrates any service other than the Divine Liturgy (or when he is attending, but not celebrating Liturgy), he will wear the mantle with the Epitrachelion, the Omophorion (the latter being worn outside the mantle), and, in some liturgical traditions, the Cuffs. He will also stand on an orlets.

When a bishop dies, his mantle is laid on his coffin in place of a funeral pall.

== Knights ==
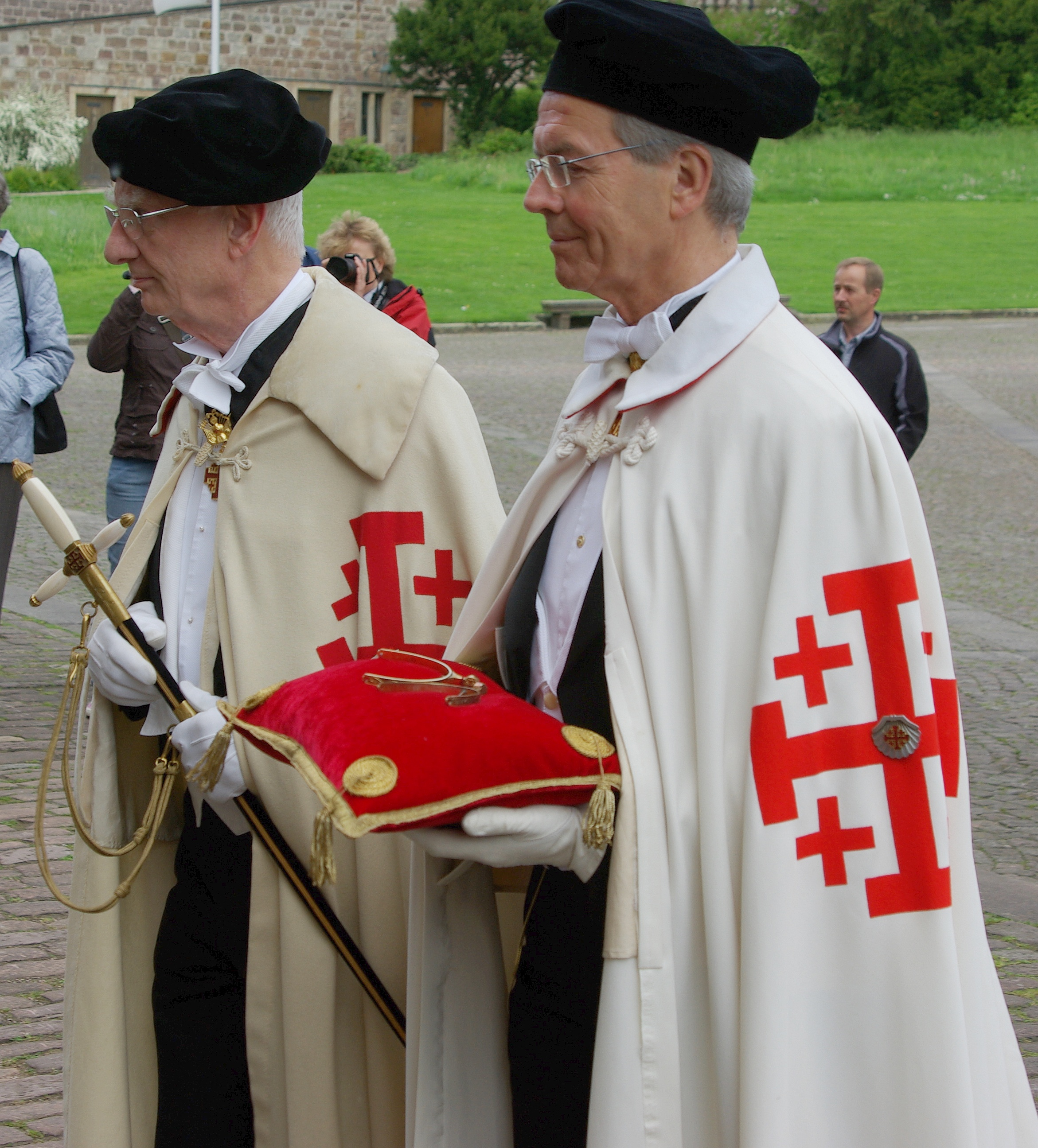
The mantle of the Equestrian Order of the Holy Sepulchre contains a Jerusalem Cross, which represent the Five Holy Wounds of Christ.

Christian knights who are members of military orders, such as the Order of Saint John and the Order of the Holy Sepulchre, wear a mantle.

== Gallery ==
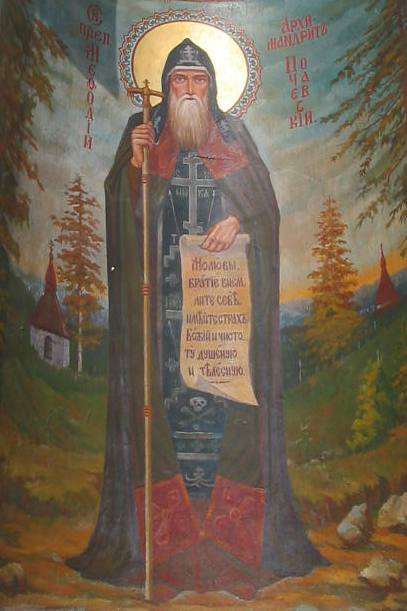
Saint Methody of Pochaiv Lavra, wearing an Archimandrite's mandyas.

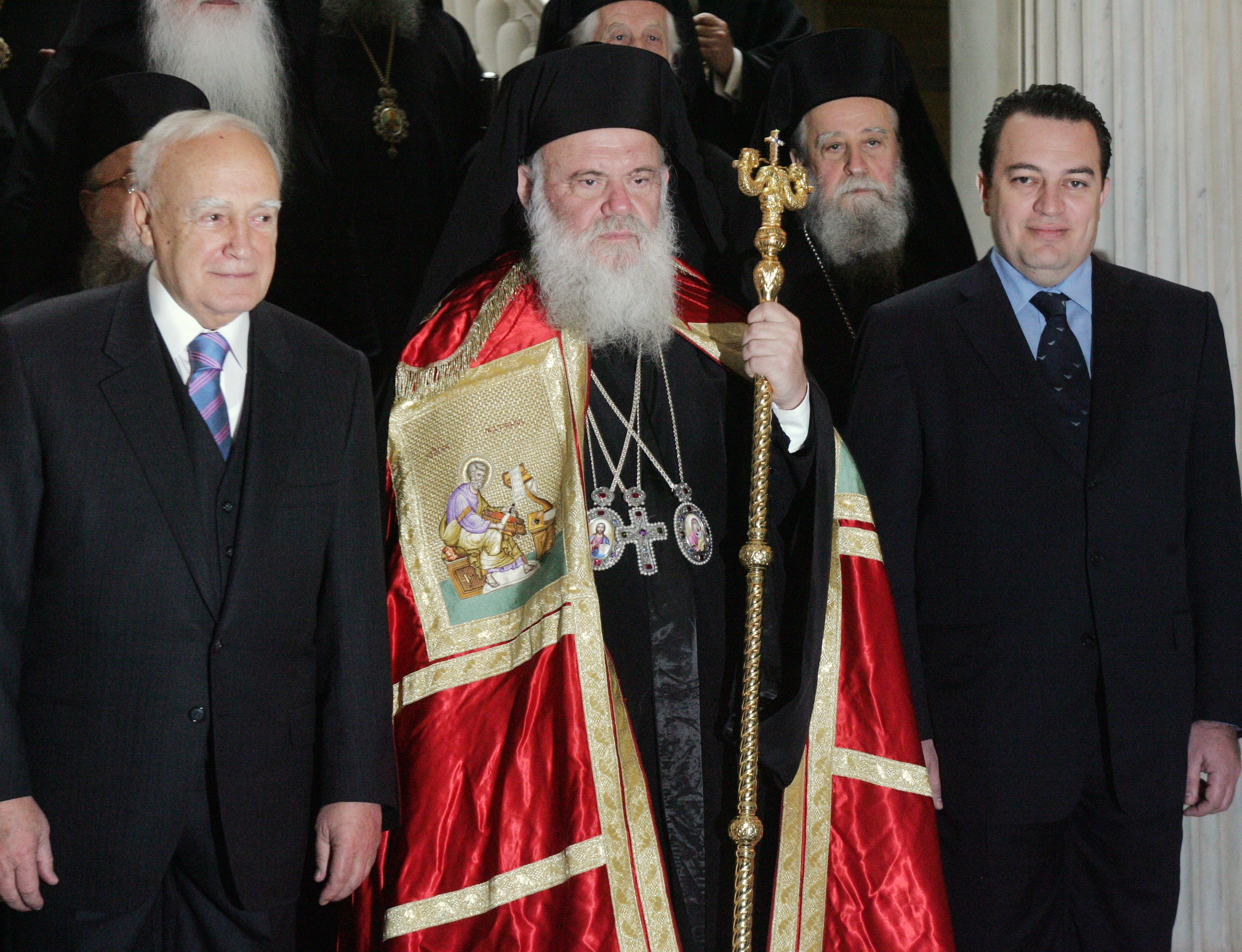
Archbishop Ieronymos II of Athens, Primate of the Church of Greece, wearing a red mantle with gold rivers. Icons of the four evangelists are present on the "tablets," at the clasps of the garment; the icon of Matthew the Apostle is clearly visible in this picture.

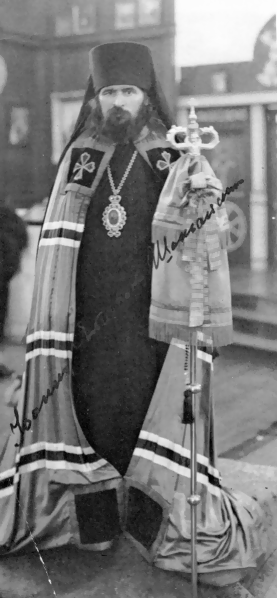
John of Shanghai and San Francisco wearing an episcopal mantiya.

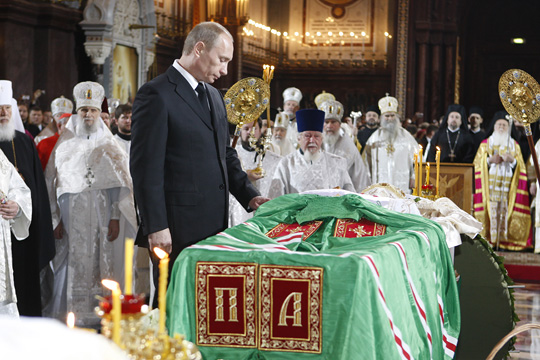
The funeral of Patriarch Alexy II of Moscow. The patriarchal mantle is draped over his coffin. The patriarch's monograms in Church Slavonic: "P" and "A", for "Patriarch Alexy", are visible in front.

== External links (photos) ==
- Simple monastic mantle
- A Schemamonk and Hieromonk in mantles
- Archimandrite Panteleimon in mantle
- Bishop Benjemin entering church in mantle
- Several Bishops seated in mantles during Hours
- Bishop in Greek-style mantle (Church of the Holy Sepulchre)
- Mantle worn by Armenian monks (Church of St. James in Jerusalem)
