= Al-Qiyama =

75th chapter of the Qur'an

Surah 75 of the Quran
القيامة Al-Qiyāmah The Resurrection
- Qira'ah; English text
- Classification: Meccan
- Other names: The Day of Resurrection
- Position: Juzʼ 29
- No. of verses: 40
- No. of Rukus: 2
- No. of words: 164
- No. of letters: 676

Al-Qiyama or Al-Qiyamah (Arabic: القيامة, al-qiyāmah), meaning "The day of standing, is the seventy-fifth chapter (sūrah) of the Quran, with 40 verses (ayah).

== Summary ==
1-4 God is able to raise the dead
5-11 Unbelievers may mock, but they shall be overtaken by the resurrection-day
12-15 Man shall be his own accuser on that day
16-19 Muhammad rebuked for anticipating Gabriel in receiving the Qurán
20-21 Men choose this life, but neglect the life to come
22-25 Various thoughts of the righteous and the wicked on the resurrection-day
26-36 Man helpless in the hour of death
37-40 God, who created man, can raise him from the dead

== Hadith ==
Ḥadīth (حديث) is literally "speech"; recorded saying or tradition of the Islamic prophet, Muhammad validated by isnad; with sira these comprise the sunnah and reveal shariah and tafsir is the Arabic word for exegesis of the Qur'an. The first and foremost exegesis of Quran is found in hadith of Muhammad thus making it important to consider the hadith related to a particular surah when studying it.

- Narrated Sa'id ibn Jubayr: Ibn 'Abbas in the explanation of the Statement of Allah. 'Move not your tongue concerning (the Quran) to make haste therewith." (75.16) Said "Allah's Apostle used to bear the revelation with great trouble and used to move his lips (quickly) with the Inspiration." Ibn 'Abbas moved his lips saying, "I am moving my lips in front of you as Allah's Apostle used to move his." Said moved his lips saying: "I am moving my lips, as I saw Ibn 'Abbas moving his." Ibn 'Abbas added, "So Allah revealed 'Move not your tongue concerning (the Qur'an) to make haste therewith. It is for us to collect it and to give you (O Muhammad) the ability to recite it (the Qur'an) (75.16-17) which means that Allah will make him (the Prophet ) remember the portion of the Qur'an which was revealed at that time by heart and recite it. The Statement of Allah: And 'When we have recited it to you (O Muhammad through Gabriel) then you follow its (Qur'an) recital' (75.18) means 'listen to it and be silent.' Then it is for Us (Allah) to make It clear to you' (75.19) means 'Then it is (for Allah) to make you recite it (and its meaning will be clear by itself through your tongue). Afterwards, Allah's Apostle used to listen to Gabriel whenever he came and after his departure he used to recite it as Gabriel had recited it."
- Narrated Ibn Abbas, (as regards) Allah's Statement: "Move not your tongue concerning (the Quran) to make haste therewith." (75.16) When Gabriel revealed the Divine Inspiration in Allah's Apostle, he (Allah's Apostle) moved his tongue and lips, and that state used to be very hard for him, and that movement indicated that revelation was taking place. So Allah revealed in Surat Al-Qiyama which begins: 'I do swear by the Day of Resurrection...' (75) the Verses:--'Move not your tongue concerning (the Quran) to make haste therewith. It is for Us to collect it (Quran) in your mind, and give you the ability to recite it by heart. (75.16-17) Ibn Abbas added: It is for Us to collect it (Qur'an) (in your mind), and give you the ability to recite it by heart means, "When We reveal it, listen. Then it is for Us to explain it," means, 'It is for us to explain it through your tongue.' So whenever Gabriel came to Allah's Apostle ' he would keep quiet (and listen), and when the Angel left, the Prophet would recite that revelation as Allah promised him.
