= Fate of the unlearned =

Eschatological question

The fate of the unlearned, also known as the destiny of the unevangelized, is an eschatological question about the ultimate destiny of people who have not been exposed to a particular theology or doctrine and thus have no opportunity to embrace it. The question is whether those who never hear of requirements issued through divine revelations will be punished for failure to abide by those requirements.

It is sometimes addressed in combination with the similar question of the fate of the unbeliever. Differing faith traditions have different responses to the question; in Western Christianity the fate of the unlearned is related to the question of original sin. As some suggest that rigid readings of religious texts require harsh punishment for those who have never heard of that religion, it is sometimes raised as an argument against the existence of God, and is generally accepted to be an extension or sub-section of the problem of evil.

== Christianity ==
In the Bible, Paul the Apostle teaches that "pagans may not possess the Law [of God] but may nevertheless have the law engraved in their hearts, and that Jesus judges people according to what is in their hearts (Romans 2:12–16)".

^{12} For as many as have sinned without law shall also perish without law: and as many as have sinned in the law shall be judged by the law; ^{13} (For not the hearers of the law are just before God, but the doers of the law shall be justified. ^{14} For when the Gentiles, which have not the law, do by nature the things contained in the law, these, having not the law, are a law unto themselves: ^{15} Which shew the work of the law written in their hearts, their conscience also bearing witness, and their thoughts the mean while accusing or else excusing one another;) ^{16} In the day when God shall judge the secrets of men by Jesus Christ according to my gospel.

— Romans 2:12–16

In the early Church, Justin Martyr, a Church Father, taught that those who lived according to the logos are Christians, though they might not know about Jesus Christ. Tertullian held that Christ has descended into Hades to deliver the Good News, with Clement of Alexandria, Origen and Athanasius declaring that "Jesus delivered from hell both Jews and Gentiles who accepted the gospel and that postmortem evangelism continues even today". Augustine of Hippo, however, believed that the unevangelized are condemned to hell and Thomas Aquinas held that those "brought up in the forest or among wolves" would be sent "the gospel message through miraculous means".

Theologian John E. Sanders noted that "Although God's decision on this issue is final, the church has never agreed on the nature of that decision". John Sanders and Clark Pinnock propose a position known as "inclusivism", under which many of the unevangelized will receive salvation because they have faith in God as they know him (as Hindus or Muslims, for example), and they are saved by Christ's work.

=== Roman Catholic ===
The Roman Catholic Church teaches that, since the Penitent Thief was granted canonization by Christ himself, God saves the unbaptized through a means known only to himself. Regarding children who die without baptism, a Holy See commission has stated:

Our conclusion is that the many factors that we have considered above give serious theological and liturgical grounds for hope that unbaptised infants who die will be saved and enjoy the Beatific Vision. We emphasise that these are reasons for prayerful hope, rather than grounds for sure knowledge. There is much that simply has not been revealed to us (cf. Jn 16:12) [...] What has been revealed to us is that the ordinary way of salvation is by the sacrament of Baptism. None of the above considerations should be taken as qualifying the necessity of Baptism or justifying delay in administering the sacrament. Rather, as we want to reaffirm in conclusion, they provide strong grounds for hope that God will save infants when we have not been able to do for them what we would have wished to do, namely, to baptize them into the faith and life of the Church.

The Catholic Church believes that Jesus Christ attained salvation "for all people by his death on the cross, but that some may choose to reject it". It teaches that salvation comes from "God alone", but that the church is the "mother" and "teacher" of the faithful. Thus, "all salvation comes through the Church", and the Catholic Church mediates Christ's salvation through the sacraments. Specifically, it teaches that Christian baptism is necessary for salvation, and that the Roman Catholic Church is also necessary as "the universal sacrament of salvation", but that some may be joined to the church by baptism of desire or by baptism of blood (martyrdom) in absence of ritual baptism, and thus attain salvation also through the church. "Divine and Catholic faith", untainted by willful heresy, and love are also necessary for salvation, as is dying in a state of grace. Catholic teaching allows for the salvation of one with genuine ignorance of the Catholic Church, who "seeks the truth and does the will of God in accordance with his understanding of it". With respect to the unlearned, Catholic theologians have traditionally taught that there are four points required for salvation, which are necessary by necessity of means, with the latter two being required if the Gospel has been preached in that land:

1. There is only one God.
2. God rewards the good and punishes the wicked.
3. God is a Holy Trinity: God the Father, God the Son, and God the Holy Ghost.
4. God the Son, Jesus Christ, became man for us, was crucified, died, and rose.

Unbaptized catechumens can be saved, in the Roman Catholic view, because the desire to receive the sacrament of baptism, together with sincere repentance for one's sins and the attainment of "divine and Catholic faith", insures salvation. In the case of the righteous unlearned, "[i]t may be supposed that such persons would have desired Baptism explicitly if they had known its necessity" and, by extension, God may permit them to attain salvation.

=== Reformed ===
In Reformed Christianity, the issue centers on whether those who have not heard the Gospel receive salvation or damnation. The Christian Reformed Church (CRC), in its funeral rites, has "prayers for those who lived openly sinful lives", i.e. "we place in your merciful hands N. [...] His/her life was filled with sin and struggle, but only you [...] perceive what mustard seed of faith [...] was hidden in his/her heart". It also prays for those "who were not known to be Christian", i.e. "we commend N. [...] to your merciful care, knowing that you [...] will do right".

=== Anglicanism ===
The Church of England, mother Church of the Anglican Communion, has a prayer for the departed unlearned: "God of infinite mercy and justice, who has made man in thine own image, and hatest nothing thou hast made, we rejoice in thy love for all creation and commend all mankind to thee, that in them thy will be done".

=== Methodism ===
With regard to the fate of the unlearned, Willard Francis Mallalieu, a Methodist bishop, wrote in Some Things That Methodism Stands For:

Starting on the assumption that salvation was possible for every redeemed soul, and that all souls are redeemed, it has held fast to the fundamental doctrine that repentance towards God and faith towards our Lord Jesus Christ are the divinely-ordained conditions upon which all complying therewith may be saved, who are intelligent enough to be morally responsible, and have heard the glad tidings of salvation. At the same time Methodism has insisted that all children who are not willing transgressors, and all irresponsible persons, are saved by the grace of God manifest in the atoning work of Christ; and, further, that all in every nation, who fear God and work righteousness, are accepted of him, through the Christ that died for them, though they have not heard of him. This view of the atonement has been held and defended by Methodist theologians from the very first. And it may be said with ever-increasing emphasis that it commends itself to all sensible and unprejudiced thinkers, for this, that it is rational and Scriptural, and at the same time honorable to God and gracious and merciful to man.

— Willard Francis Mallalieu

The United Methodist Church thus has prayers for the dead for unbaptized children and those "who did not profess the Christian faith: we 'commit those who are dear to us to your never-failing love, for this life and the life to come'". The Methodist funeral liturgy for non-Christians beseeches God to "look favorably [...] upon those [...] who scarcely knew your grace. [...] Grant mercy also to those who have departed this life in ignorance or defiance of you. We plead for them in the spirit of him who prayed, 'Father, forgive them, for they know not what they do'".

=== Baptists ===
The Orthodox Creed, the confession of faith held by the General Baptists, teaches in Article XLIV:

We do believe, that all little Children dying in their Infancy, (viz.) before they are capable to choose either Good or Evil, whether born of Believing Parents, or Unbelieving Parents, shall be saved by the Grace of God, and Merit of Christ their Redeemer, and Work of the Holy Ghost, and so being made Members of the Invisible Church, shall injoy Life everlasting; for our Lord Jesus saith, of such belongs the Kingdom of Heaven. Ergo, We conclude, that that opinion is false, which saith, That those little Infants dying before Baptism, are damned.

=== Church of Jesus Christ of Latter-day Saints ===
The Church of Jesus Christ of Latter-day Saints (LDS Church) teaches that those who die without knowledge of LDS theology will have the opportunity to receive a knowledge of the gospel of Jesus Christ in the spirit world. Latter-day Saints believe that God has provided a way so that all of humankind will have an opportunity to hear the message of the gospel, and can thereby choose whether to accept it or not. Latter-day Saints assert that modern day revelation has clarified and confirmed the Biblical accounts that during the three days between his death and resurrection, Christ "went and preached unto the spirits in prison" (1 Peter 3:19, see also 1 Peter 4:6), at which time he also commissioned other spirits to "go forth and carry the light of the gospel to them that were in darkness, even to all the spirits of men" (Doctrine and Covenants 138:30). Since Latter-day Saints believe that all people must receive the proper ordinances in order to enter into the Kingdom of Heaven, today members of the LDS Church participate in a massive genealogical effort to compile names of their kindred dead, and then act as proxies in ordinances performed on behalf of their deceased ancestors within LDS temples. The beneficiaries of this temple work are then free to accept or reject the vicarious ordinances performed on their behalf.

Latter-day Saints do not believe that children come into the world with any guilt, because Jesus Christ atoned for "original guilt"; therefore no one is condemned by original sin and people are responsible only for their own sins once they have reached the age of accountability. Those incapable of understanding right from wrong, such as the mentally handicapped, are also saved under the atonement of Jesus Christ without baptism.

In Latter-day Saint belief, only "sons of perdition" who choose to reject Jesus after receiving a sure knowledge of him are destined for a form of Hell called outer darkness.

=== Jehovah's Witnesses ===
Jehovah's Witnesses believe that humans inherited sin and death as a result of Adam's rebellion, and that God sent Jesus to redeem mankind from that condition. They consider faith in that provision to be the only way to attain its benefits, and therefore view their preaching work as essential and urgent. They believe that once sufficient time has been given for preaching, Jesus will assume authority and destroy the current "system of things". Only baptized members of the denomination who are alive at the time of the Great Tribulation will survive and form the basis of a new world ruled by Christ and a relatively small group of 144,000 persons whom he invites to be his corulers.

They believe that those who have no opportunity to hear their message, for example, due to government restrictions or other causes beyond the Witnesses' control, may be destroyed under a "principle of community responsibility". However, The Watchtower has also stated that, "to what extent will Jesus consider community responsibility and family merit [...] We cannot say, and it is pointless to speculate". They also believe that young children of Jehovah's Witnesses may be saved even if they have not yet been baptized. For all other cases, they consider baptism a requirement for salvation.

Jehovah's Witnesses believe that most people who die prior to the Great Tribulation will be resurrected on earth during Christ's millennial reign, including those who never had the opportunity to hear their message, as well as Biblical figures who died before Jesus' sacrifice. Jehovah's Witnesses believe that prior sins committed by those resurrected will be forgiven, and that they will be judged based on their actions during the millennium. Those judged unfavorably will then be permanently destroyed and the remainder will be allowed to live forever in an earthly paradise.

=== Christian universalism ===
Christian universalism is a school of Christian theology focused around the doctrine of universal reconciliation, the view that all human beings will ultimately be saved and restored to a right relationship with God. "Christian universalism" and "the belief or hope in the universal reconciliation through Christ" can be understood as synonyms. Opponents of this school, who hold that eternal damnation is the ultimate fate of some or most people, are sometimes called "infernalists."

As a formal Christian denomination, Christian universalism originated in the late 18th century with the Universalist Church of America. There is no single denomination uniting Christian universalists, but a few denominations teach some of the principles of Christian universalism or are open to them. Instead, their membership has been consolidated with the American Unitarian Association into the Unitarian Universalist Association in 1961.

== Islam ==
A similar issue exists in Islam, as different authorities within the faith have issued different theories as to the destiny of those who do not know of Muhammad or God. Islam generally rejects the possibility that those who have never heard of the revelations embodied in the Quran might automatically merit punishment.

According to Quran, the basic criteria for salvation in the afterlife is the belief in one God, the Last Judgment, acceptance and obedience of what is in the Quran and ordained by the prophet, and good deeds. As the Qur'an states:

Indeed, the believers, Jews, Sabians and Christians—whoever ˹truly˺ believes in Allah and the Last Day and does good, there will be no fear for them, nor will they grieve.

— Quran 5:69

One view is that "A person who has never heard of Islam or the Prophet [...] and who has never heard the message in its correct and true form, will not be punished by Allah if he dies in a state of disbelief. If it were asked what his fate will be, the answer will be that Allah will test him on the Day of Resurrection: if he obeys, he will enter Paradise and if he disobeys he will enter Hell". Those who support this view base it on hadiths explicitly describing this, as well as the Qur'anic verse “And We never punish until We have sent a Messenger (to give warning)”.

But, the other view is that even those who have not heard the message will be held to some standard of conduct: "Because everyone is a born Muslim, those who have never heard of Islam are only responsible for not doing what common sense tells him or her to do. Those who knowingly violate God's laws will be punished for their wrongdoing". Under this view, those who have not heard the message are "excused", and Allah "rewards such people for the good they have done, and they enjoy the blessings of Paradise".

Some would extend this mercy to the incompetently evangelized, that is, to people "who have been reached by the name of Muhammad but who have been given a false account", and for whom it is then said that they "have not rejected true Islam but only a distorted version of it and they will therefore be judged in the same category as those people who never heard of Islam in the first place".

== Other positions ==
In Buddhism, it is believed that all beings, whether evangelized or not, will continue to be reborn until they have achieved Nirvana. However, Buddhist scholars have said that "any suggestion that enlightenment is immediately available to anyone who really wants it, even if he has never heard of Buddhism, is likely to be received with incredulity or even resentment".

== See also ==
- 10/40 window
- Christian views on Hell
- Harrowing of Hell
- Invincible ignorance (Catholic theology)
- Jahannam (Hell in Islam)
- Limbo
- Molinism
- Universal opportunity
- Vincible ignorance
