= Vincible and invincible ignorance =

Concepts in Catholic moral theology

Vincible ignorance is, in Catholic moral theology, ignorance that a person could remove by applying reasonable diligence in the given set of circumstances. It contrasts with another concept in Catholic moral theology, invincible ignorance, which is an ignorance that a person is either entirely incapable of removing, or could only do so by supererogatory efforts (i.e., efforts above and beyond normal duty).

== Doctrine of vincible ignorance ==
While invincible ignorance eliminates culpability, vincible ignorance at most mitigates it, and may even aggravate guilt. The guilt of an action performed in vincible ignorance ought to be measured by the degree of diligence or negligence shown in performing the act. In this paradigm, it is culpable to remain willfully ignorant of matters that one is obligated to know.

An individual is morally responsible for their ignorance and for the acts resulting from it. If some insufficient diligence was shown in dispelling ignorance, it is termed merely vincible; it may diminish culpability to the point of rendering a sin venial. When little or no effort is made to remove ignorance, the ignorance is termed crass or supine; it removes little or no guilt. Deliberately fostered ignorance is deemed affected or studied; it can increase guilt.

Ignorance may be:

- Of law, when one is unaware of the existence of the law itself, or at least that a particular case is comprised under its provisions.
- Of fact, when not the relation of something to the law but the thing itself or some circumstance is unknown.
- Of penalty, when a person is not cognizant that a sanction has been attached to a particular crime. This is especially to be considered when there is question of more serious punishment.

== Doctrine of invincible ignorance ==
"Invincible ignorance excuses from all culpability. An action committed in ignorance of the law prohibiting it, or of the facts of the case, is not a voluntary act". On the other hand, it is culpable to remain willfully ignorant of matters that one is obligated to know (vincible ignorance). In this case the individual is morally responsible for their ignorance, and for the acts resulting from it. The guilt associated with an offense committed in ignorance is less than it would have been if the act were committed in full knowledge, because in that case the offense is less voluntary.

== Protestant view ==
Protestants diverged from Catholic doctrine in this area during the Reformation. Martin Luther believed that invincible ignorance was only a valid excuse for offenses against human law. In his view, humans are ignorant of divine law because of original sin, for which all bear guilt. John Calvin agreed that ignorance of God's law is always vincible.

== See also ==
- Fate of the unlearned
- Future probation
- Baptism of desire
- Willful blindness
- Virtuous pagan
