= List of ship decommissionings in 1946 =

The list of ship decommissionings in 1946 is a chronological list of ships decommissioned in 1946. In cases where no official decommissioning ceremony was held, the date of withdrawal from service may be used instead. For ships lost at sea, see list of shipwrecks in 1946 instead.

Date	Operator	Ship	Class and type	Fate and other notes	Ref
4 January	Royal Navy	Begum	Ruler-class escort carrier	Returned to the United States and sold as merchant Raki	
5 January	Royal Navy	Attacker	Attacker-class escort carrier	Returned to the United States and sold as merchant Castel Forte	
10 January	United States Navy	Ramapo	Patoka-class oiler	Sold for scrap	
15 January	United States Navy	Breese	Wickes-class destroyer	Sold for scrap	
16 January	United States Navy	Salinas	Patoka-class oiler	Sold for scrap	
17 January	Royal Navy	Ameer	Ruler-class escort carrier	Returned to the United States and sold as merchant Robin Kirk	
18 January	United States Navy	Mount Vernon	Troop transport	Returned to previous owners	
26 January	Royal Navy	Khedive	Ruler-class escort carrier	Returned to the United States and sold as merchant Rempang	
29 January	Royal Navy	Ruler	Ruler-class escort carrier	Returned to the United States and stricken in 1946	
4 February	Royal Navy	Empress	Ruler-class escort carrier	Returned to the United States and stricken in 1946	
12 February	Royal Navy	Battler	Attacker-class escort carrier	Returned to the United States and stricken in 1946	
12 February	Royal Navy	Emperor	Ruler-class escort carrier	Returned to the United States and stricken in 1946	
12 February	Royal Navy	Pursuer	Attacker-class escort carrier	Returned to the United States and stricken in 1946	
12 February	Royal Navy	Striker	Attacker-class escort carrier	Returned to the United States and stricken in 1946	
26 February	Royal Navy	Ravager	Ruler-class escort carrier	Returned to the United States and sold as merchant Robin Trent	
27 February	Royal Navy	Slinger	Ruler-class escort carrier	Returned to the United States and sold as merchant Robin Mowbray	
28 February	United States Navy	Abarenda	Floating storage tanker	In reserve at Subic Bay under the War Shipping Administration, stricken in 1946 and sold for scrap in 1948	
1 March	United States Navy	Sepulga	Patoka-class oiler	Sold for scrap	
3 March	Royal Navy	Arbiter	Ruler-class escort carrier	Returned to the United States and sold as merchant Coracero	
3 March	Royal Navy	Trouncer	Ruler-class escort carrier	Returned to the United States and sold as merchant Greystoke Castle	
6 March	United States Navy	Tippecanoe	Patoka-class oiler	Sold for scrap	
3 March	Royal Navy	Puncher	Ruler-class escort carrier	Returned to the United States and sold as merchant Muncaster Castle	
25 March	Brazilian Navy	Ceará	Submarine support ship	Scrapped	
26 March	United States Navy	Long Island	Long Island-class escort carrier	Sold as merchant Nelly	
28 March	United States Navy	Charger	Charger-class escort carrier	Sold as merchant Fairsea	
2 April	Royal Navy	Premier	Ruler-class escort carrier	Returned to the United States and sold as merchant Rhodesia Star	
5 May	United States Navy	Wake Island	Casablanca-class escort carrier	Scrapped	
6 April	Royal Navy	Smiter	Ruler-class escort carrier	Returned to the United States and sold as merchant Artillero	
12 April	Royal Navy	Trumpeter	Ruler-class escort carrier	Returned to the United States and sold as merchant Alblasserdijk	
15 April	United States Navy	Nehenta Bay	Casablanca-class escort carrier	Reserve until stricken in 1959 and scrapped	
19 April	United States Navy	Kitkun Bay	Casablanca-class escort carrier	Scrapped	
19 April	United States Navy	Makin Island	Casablanca-class escort carrier	Scrapped	
20 April	United States Navy	Badoeng Strait	Commencement Bay-class escort carrier	Reserve until recommissioned in 1947	
26 April	United States Navy	Admiralty Islands	Casablanca-class escort carrier	Scrapped	
30 April	United States Navy	Tulagi	Casablanca-class escort carrier	Scrapped	
1 May	United States Navy	Takanis Bay	Casablanca-class escort carrier	Reserve until stricken in 1959 and scrapped	
3 May	United States Navy	Card	Bogue-class escort carrier	Reserve until transferred to the Military Sea Transportation Service in 1958	
9 May	United States Navy	Roi	Casablanca-class escort carrier	Scrapped	
9 May	United States Navy	Salamaua	Casablanca-class escort carrier	Scrapped	
12 May	Royal Navy	Chaser	Attacker-class escort carrier	Returned to the United States and sold as merchant Aagtekerk	
15 May	United States Navy	Kalinin Bay	Casablanca-class escort carrier	Scrapped	
15 May	United States Navy	Solomons	Casablanca-class escort carrier	Scrapped	
20 May	United States Navy	Croatan	Bogue-class escort carrier	Reserve until transferred to the Military Sea Transportation Service in 1958	
20 May	United States Navy	Natoma Bay	Casablanca-class escort carrier	Reserve until stricken in 1958 and scrapped	
20 May	Royal Navy	Reaper	Ruler-class escort carrier	Returned to the United States and sold as merchant South Africa Star	
21 May	United States Navy	Abbot	Fletcher-class destroyer	Reserve with San Diego Group, Pacific Reserve Fleet until recommissioned in 1951	
21 May	United States Navy	Gilbert Islands	Commencement Bay-class escort carrier	Reserve until recommissioned in 1951	
22 May	United States Navy	Tripoli	Casablanca-class escort carrier	Reserve until transferred to the Military Sea Transportation Service in 1952	
28 May	United States Navy	Block Island	Commencement Bay-class escort carrier	Reserve until recommissioned in 1951	
28 May	United States Navy	Trinity	Patoka-class oiler	Sold for scrap	
30 May	United States Navy	Daniel T. Griffin	Buckley-class destroyer escort	Sold to Chile as Virgilio Uribe	
8 June	United States Navy	Attu	Casablanca-class escort carrier	Attempted sale as merchant Gay but scrapped instead	
8 June	United States Navy	Edsall	Edsall-class destroyer escort	Sold for scrap	
8 June	United States Navy	Wakefield	Troop transport	Reserve until sold for scrap in 1959	
10 June	United States Navy	Casablanca	Casablanca-class escort carrier	Scrapped	
14 June	United States Navy	Kadashan Bay	Casablanca-class escort carrier	Reserve until stricken in 1959 and scrapped	
19 June	United States Navy	Saginaw Bay	Casablanca-class escort carrier	Reserve until stricken in 1958 and scrapped	
28 June	United States Navy	Shipley Bay	Casablanca-class escort carrier	Reserve until stricken in 1959 and scrapped	
1 July	United States Navy	Patoka	Patoka-class oiler	Sold for scrap	
1 July	United States Navy	Steamer Bay	Casablanca-class escort carrier	Reserve until stricken in 1959 and scrapped	
3 July	United States Navy	Kula Gulf	Commencement Bay-class escort carrier	Reserve until recommissioned in 1951	
5 July	United States Navy	Copahee	Bogue-class escort carrier	Reserve until stricken in 1959 and scrapped	
6 July	United States Navy	Kasaan Bay	Casablanca-class escort carrier	Reserve until stricken in 1959 and scrapped	
6 July	United States Navy	Tulagi	Casablanca-class escort carrier	Scrapped	
10 July	United States Navy	White Plains	Casablanca-class escort carrier	Reserve until stricken in 1958 and scrapped	
15 July	United States Navy	Guadalcanal	Casablanca-class escort carrier	Reserve until stricken in 1958 and scrapped	
17 July	Royal Navy	Speaker	Ruler-class escort carrier	Returned to the United States and sold as merchant Lancero	
20 July	United States Navy	Corregidor	Casablanca-class escort carrier	Reserve until transferred to the Military Sea Transport Service	
20 July	United States Navy	Hoggatt Bay	Casablanca-class escort carrier	Reserve until stricken in 1959 and scrapped	
29 July	United States Navy	Arkansas	Wyoming-class battleship	Target ship	
31 July	United States Navy	Manila Bay	Casablanca-class escort carrier	Reserve until stricken in 1958 and scrapped	
31 July	United States Navy	Petrof Bay	Casablanca-class escort carrier	Reserve until stricken in 1958 and scrapped	
5 August	United States Navy	Coral Sea	Casablanca-class escort carrier	Reserve until stricken in 1959 and scrapped	
7 August	United States Navy	Thetis Bay	Casablanca-class escort carrier	Reserve until recommissioned in 1956	
9 August	United States Navy	Makassar Strait	Casablanca-class escort carrier	Reserve until stricken in 1958 and used as a target ship	
9 August	United States Navy	Vella Gulf	Commencement Bay-class escort carrier	Reserve until stricken in 1970 and scrapped	
14 August	United States Navy	Chenango	Sangamon-class escort carrier	Reserve until stricken in 1959 and scrapped	
14 August	United States Navy	Fanshaw Bay	Casablanca-class escort carrier	Reserve until stricken in 1959 and scrapped	
16 August	United States Navy	Kwajalein	Casablanca-class escort carrier	Reserve until stricken in 1960 and scrapped	
20 August	United States Navy	Breton	Bogue-class escort carrier	Reserve until transferred to the Military Sea Transportation Service in 1959	
22 August	United States Navy	Cape Esperance	Casablanca-class escort carrier	Reserve until transferred to the Military Sea Transportation Service	
23 August	Royal Norwegian Navy	Honningsvåg	Naval trawler	Sold as a fishing trawler in 1947, scrapped in 1973	
28 August	United States Navy	Independence	Independence-class aircraft carrier	Radiation research hulk until sunk as a target	
29 August	United States Navy	Barnes	Bogue-class escort carrier	Reserve until stricken in 1959 and scrapped	
29 August	United States Navy	Prince William	Bogue-class escort carrier	Reserve until stricken in 1959 and scrapped	
13 September	United States Navy	Munda	Casablanca-class escort carrier	Reserve until stricken in 1958 and scrapped	
17 September	United States Navy	Rapidan	Patoka-class oiler	Sold for scrap	
27 September	United States Navy	Altamaha	Bogue-class escort carrier	Reserve until stricken in 1959 and scrapped	
4 October	United States Navy	Core	Bogue-class escort carrier	Reserve until transferred to the Military Sea Transportation Service in 1958	
9 October	United States Navy	Nassau	Bogue-class escort carrier	Reserve until stricken in 1959 and scrapped	
11 October	United States Navy	Matanikau	Casablanca-class escort carrier	Reserve until stricken in 1960 and scrapped	
18 October	United States Navy	Puget Sound	Commencement Bay-class escort carrier	Reserve until stricken in 1960 and scrapped	
21 October	United States Navy	Santee	Sangamon-class escort carrier	Reserve until stricken in 1959 and scrapped	
24 October	United States Navy	Lunga Point	Casablanca-class escort carrier	Reserve until stricken in 1960 and scrapped	
29 October	United States Navy	Ranger	Aircraft carrier	Sold for scrap	
31 October	Royal Navy	Queen	Ruler-class escort carrier	Returned to the United States and sold as merchant Roebiah	
31 October	United States Navy	West Point	Troop transport	Returned to previous owners	
3 November	United States Navy	Bougainville	Casablanca-class escort carrier	Reserve until stricken in 1960 and scrapped	
5 November	United States Navy	Cape Gloucester	Commencement Bay-class escort carrier	Reserve until stricken in 1971 and scrapped	
8 November	United States Navy	Bennington	Essex-class aircraft carrier	Reserve until recommissioned in 1951	
9 November	United States Navy	Bogue	Bogue-class escort carrier	Reserve until stricken in 1959 and scrapped	
21 November	Royal Navy	Ranee	Ruler-class escort carrier	Returned to the United States and sold as merchant Friesland	
27 November	United States Navy	Commencement Bay	Commencement Bay-class escort carrier	Reserve until stricken in 1971 and scrapped	
30 November	United States Navy	Sitkoh Bay	Casablanca-class escort carrier	Reserve until transferred to the Military Sea Transportation Service	
11 December	Royal Navy	Fencer	Attacker-class escort carrier	Returned to the United States and sold as merchant Sydney	
12 December	United States Navy	Savo Island	Casablanca-class escort carrier	Reserve until stricken in 1959 and scrapped	
13 December	Royal Navy	Atheling	Ruler-class escort carrier	Returned to the United States and sold as merchant Roma	
13 December	United States Navy	Lamberton	Wickes-class destroyer	Sold for scrap	
13 December	Royal Navy	Patroller	Ruler-class escort carrier	Returned to the United States and sold as merchant Almkerk	
13 December	Royal Navy	Rajah	Ruler-class escort carrier	Returned to the United States and sold as merchant Drente	
unknown date	Allied-occupied Germany	Bussard	Bussard-class seaplane tender	Surrendered to the United States	
unknown date	Allied-occupied Germany	Falke	Bussard-class seaplane tender	Surrendered to the Soviet Union	
unknown date	Allied-occupied Germany	Gunther Pluschow	Bussard-class seaplane tender	Surrendered to the Soviet Union and renamed Kodor	
