= USS Alameda (AO-10) =

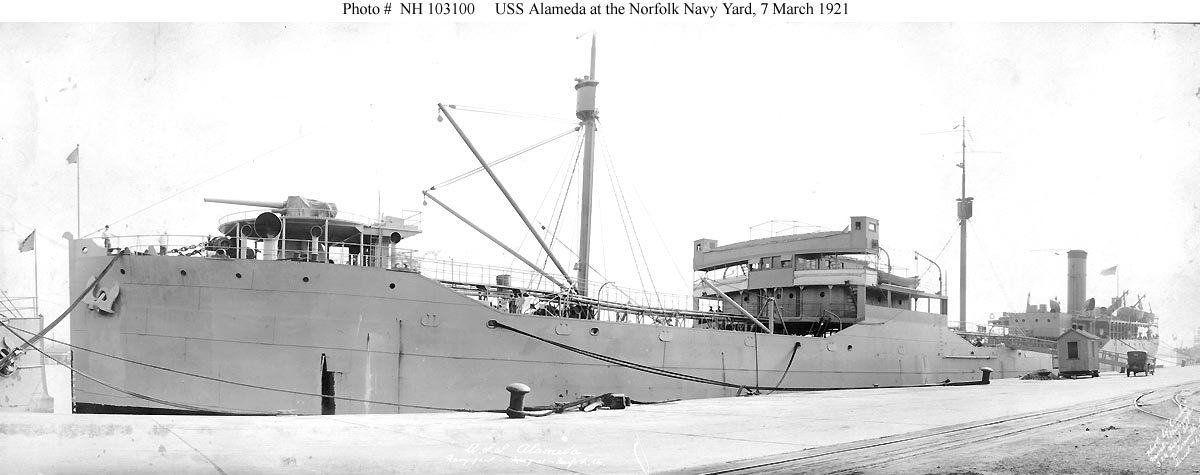
- Alameda at the Norfolk Navy Yard, Portsmouth, Virginia, on 7 March 1921

History

United States
- Name: USS Alameda (Fuel Ship No. 10)
- Namesake: Alameda, California
- Builder: William Cramp & Sons, Philadelphia
- Yard number: 497
- Laid down: 16 December 1918
- Launched: 15 July 1919
- Sponsored by: Mrs. Richard G. Widdows
- Completed: October 1919
- Acquired: 17 October 1919
- Commissioned: 17 October 1919
- Reclassified: AO-10, summer 1920
- Decommissioned: 29 March 1922
- Stricken: 8 August 1922
- Fate: Sold 9 August 1922
- Notes: sister ship of USS Kaweah (AO-15), Laramie (AO-16), and Mattole (AO-17)

History
- Name: 1925: SS Olean; 1943: SS Sweep
- Owner: 1925: Vacuum Oil Company (Socony-Vacuum Oil Company after 1931 merger); 1942: War Shipping Administration
- Port of registry: (United States) New York
- Refit: rebuilt in 1943 after torpedo attack by U-158
- Fate: transferred to U.S. Navy in July 1944

United States
- Name: USS Silver Cloud
- Acquired: 12 July 1944
- Commissioned: 12 July 1944
- Decommissioned: 29 March 1946
- Stricken: 17 April 1946
- Fate: Transferred to War Shipping Administration 29 March 1946; Sold for scrapping, 21 January 1947

General characteristics
- Type: Design 1128 tanker
- Displacement: 4,410 tons (light); 14,450 tons (normal)
- Length: 446 ft (136 m)
- Beam: 58 ft (18 m) (waterline)
- Draft: 25 ft 6 in (7.77 m) (mean)
- Depth: 33 ft 3 in (10.13 m)
- Installed power: 2,800 shp (2,100 kW)
- Propulsion: 1 triple-expansion steam engine, one shaft
- Speed: 11 knots (20 km/h)
- Capacity: 1,000 tons
- Complement: 252
- Armament: 2 × 5-inch (127-millimeter) guns; 2 × 3-inch (76.2-millimeter) guns; 2 × .50-caliber (12.7-millimeter) machine guns

USS Alameda (Fuel Ship No. 10/AO-10) was a United States Navy tanker in commission from 1919 to 1922. She was built as the civilian tanker SS Alameda, but transferred to the U.S. Navy after completion in 1919. She was sold for commercial service and operated under the names SS Olean and SS Sweep before she was transferred to the Navy again in World War II as USS Silver Cloud (IX-143).

SS Alameda, one of four Design 1128 civilian tankers, was built by William Cramp & Sons for the United States Shipping Board, but was acquired by the U.S. Navy after her completion. After suffering a major fire in 1921, she was decommissioned in 1922 and sold. Repaired, she entered commercial service as SS Olean in 1925.

Around the time the United States entry into World War II in December 1941, Olean was equipped with defensive armament and a complement of Naval Armed Guardsmen. In March 1942, the tanker was sailing unescorted off the North Carolina coast, when she was torpedoed twice by U-158 and abandoned with the loss of six men. The ship, however, remained afloat and was towed to Hampton Roads, Virginia. Although originally thought too damaged to repair, she nevertheless reentered service under the control of the War Shipping Administration in April 1943 as SS Sweep.

In October 1943, the U.S. Navy selected Sweep for service as a floating storage tanker in the Pacific. The ship was transferred to Navy control in July at Eniwetok, and commissioned as USS Silver Cloud (IX-143). She was transferred to Manus in August, and to Leyte in January 1945. At the end of 1945, she sailed to Mobile, Alabama, to await disposal. Transferred to the War Shipping Administration in March 1946, she was struck from the Naval Vessel Register in April, sold for scrapping in January 1947.

== Design and construction ==
Alameda was laid down on 16 December 1918 as SS Alameda at Philadelphia, by William Cramp & Sons for the United States Shipping Board (USSB). She was one of four Design 1128 tankers built by Cramp, all of which served as United States Navy oilers. Alameda was launched on 15 July 1919, sponsored by Helen Mull Widdows, daughter of Cramp's president, J. H. Mull.

As built, the ship was 430 feet (131.1 m) in length (overall), 58 feet 2 inches (17.73 m) abeam, and had a depth of 31 feet 5 inches (9.58 m). She drew 25 feet 9 inches (7.85 m) with 8 feet (2.4 m) of freeboard. She was powered by a single triple-expansion steam engine (also manufactured by Cramp) with cylinders of 27, 45½, and 76 inches (69, 115, and 190 cm) diameter with a 51-inch (130 cm) stroke. Operating at 190 pounds per square inch (1,300 kPa), her three boilers had a grate area of 186 square feet (17.3 m^{2}) and heating surface of 8,095 square feet (752.1 m^{2}). The engine generated 565 horsepower (421 kW), and could move the ship with a top speed of 11 knots (20 km/h).

== U.S. Navy service, 1919–1922 ==
Alameda was acquired by the U.S. Navy from the United States Shipping Board on 17 October 1919. She was commissioned that same day at the Philadelphia Navy Yard as USS Alameda (Fuel Ship No. 10). Soon after commissioning, Alameda was assigned to the Naval Overseas Transportation Service. She embarked upon her first voyage—to Port Arthur, Texas, on the gulf coast—took on a cargo of oil there, and headed back to the east coast. She entered port at Norfolk, Virginia, on 27 November 1919 and underwent repairs there until 5 December 1919.

After visiting Boston, Alameda departed from New York on 29 December 1919 and once again headed for Port Arthur. She stopped at Charleston, South Carolina, for engine repairs on 2 January 1920, then resumed her voyage to Port Arthur on 11 January 1920, arriving there on 16 January 1920. Since no fuel oil was available there at that time, she headed back to Hampton Roads, Virginia, on 23 January 1920 without a cargo. She arrived at Norfolk on 29 January 1920 and began another round of engine repairs. Alameda departed Hampton Roads on 11 February 1920 and arrived at Port Arthur on 18 February 1920. There she loaded a cargo of fuel oil in preparation for her first transatlantic voyage.

On 21 February 1920, Alameda departed Port Arthur for the British Isles. She entered port on the River Clyde in Scotland on 13 March 1920 and remained there until 24 March 1920, when she headed back toward the Texas coast. She reached Port Arthur on 16 April 1920 and began loading another cargo of fuel oil. Once loaded, she put to sea bound for Norfolk, where she arrived on 2 May 1920. She underwent ten days of repairs at Norfolk before heading for New York on 12 May 1920. She entered port at New York on 13 May 1920 and began fueling ships of the United States Atlantic Fleet. On 16 May 1920, Alameda departed New York and headed back to Norfolk for additional repairs. On 1 June 1920, she exited Chesapeake Bay and shaped a course back to Port Arthur. Arriving there on 6 June 1920 she loaded fuel oil and then put to sea bound for Glasgow, Scotland.

In the summer of 1920, the U.S. Navy adopted the alphanumeric system of hull designations, and Alameda was designated AO-10 under the new system. Alameda continued to serve with the Naval Overseas Transportation Service for the remainder of her naval career. In addition to operations between Port Arthur and ports on the U.S. east coast, she also made further voyages across the Atlantic Ocean to support U.S. Navy warships operating in European waters.

On 19 November 1921, while steaming about 30 nautical miles (56 km) off Cape Henry, Virginia, Alameda suffered an explosion in her fire room and began to burn. When firefighting efforts proved fruitless, her crew abandoned the vessel in stormy seas. Among the ships responding to Alameda's distress calls, were the United States Coast Guard cutter Seminole and the British steamer Bristol, which rescued Alameda's entire crew and remained near the burning ship until firefighting equipment arrived. Alameda remained afloat and was towed into Norfolk on the 20th. There she remained until formally decommissioned on 29 March 1922. Her name was struck from the Naval Vessel Register on 8 August 1922, and she was sold to the Newport Engineering Company of Washington, D.C., on 18 August for $100,000.

== Commercial service ==
Her new owner repaired her, and she entered mercantile service as SS Olean in 1925. By 1930, she was sailing for the Vacuum Oil Company, and, after that company's 1931 merger with Standard Oil Company of New York (or Socony), for the Socony-Vacuum Oil Company which was later renamed Mobil Oil. In March 1930, The New York Times reported that Olean's chief engineer disappeared while the ship was steaming from Port Arthur to Paulsboro, New Jersey. According to the article, the engineer's wife had received a message from her husband stating that he was worried about their financial affairs. Another death of an Olean crewman was reported by The New York Times in September 1939, when a fireman aboard the ship was stabbed to death by a mess attendant while the ship was anchored in the Delaware River at the Port of Paulsboro.

Around the time that the United States entered World War II in December 1941, Olean was defensively armed and assigned a crew of four Naval Armed Guardsmen.

On 14 March 1942, Olean was sailing from Norfolk, Virginia, to Beaumont, Texas. The ship was sailing unescorted and—according to Theodore Bockhoff, the ship's master—with all lights extinguished. One survivor, however, reported that a dim light was burning on one of the masts. At 23:05, while near position 34°24′30″N 76°29′0″W, about 15 nautical miles (28 km) from Cape Lookout, North Carolina, Olean was hit in the engine room by a single torpedo launched from U-158 under the command of Kapitänleutnant Erwin Rostin. Damage from the torpedo caused the ship to veer out of control. The Naval Armed Guard spotted U-158, but were unable to depress their gun far enough to be able to hit the U-boat. At 23:45 the order to abandon ship was given and the 36 officers, men, and gunners took to the lifeboats. As the no. 3 boat reached the water, however, a second torpedo launched by Rostin hit the engine room and destroyed the lifeboat, killing one officer and six men. Lifesaving stations at Cape Lookout and Fort Macon sent motor launches and were able to rescue the remaining 30 men from Olean nine hours after the attack, and landed them at Morehead City.

As with her November 1921 fire, Olean did not sink from the twin torpedo hits. She was towed to Hampton Roads and dry docked, but was declared a constructive total loss. The need for shipping was great, and despite the severity of Olean's damage, the ship was acquired by the War Shipping Administration (WSA) in April 1942. The WSA had the vessel reconditioned and repaired at Baltimore. The ship was re-engined with a triple-expansion steam engine built in 1941 by Hooven-Owens-Rentschler of Hamilton, Ohio. The cylinders of the new engine were 22½, 41½, and 68 inches (57, 105, and 170 cm) in diameter and had a 48-inch (120 cm) stroke, which generated a nominal 350 horsepower (260 kW). The ship was also re-boilered with two water tube boilers that had a heating surface of 4,012 square feet (372.7 m^{2}) and operated at 220 pounds per square inch (1,500 kPa). The newly reconditioned ship was renamed Sweep and was employed in duties in the Pacific.

== U.S. Navy service, 1944–45 ==
In October 1943, the U.S. Navy selected Sweep for use as a mobile floating storage tanker in the Pacific and in November chose the name Silver Cloud for her. The ship was accepted and commissioned at Eniwetok in the Marshall Islands on 12 July 1944. The Navy acquired Sweep for use as a mobile floating storage tanker for fuel oil, and commissioned her as USS Silver Cloud (IX-143) the same day.

On 15 July, Silver Cloud fueled her first ships, two destroyers. She remained in the Marshall Islands until 17 August, when she departed for Manus Island in the Admiralty Islands. She dropped anchor there in Seeadler Harbor on 28 August and fueled almost 200 ships before departing for Hollandia, New Guinea, on 28 December. After calling at Hollandia, Silver Cloud moved to San Pedro Bay at Leyte in the Philippine Islands. She arrived there on 15 January 1945, and remained in the Philippines until 30 December, when she departed for the Panama Canal and from there to New Orleans, for disposal. She arrived at New Orleans on 10 March 1946 and departed the next day for Mobile, Alabama, arriving there on 12 March. Silver Cloud was decommissioned and delivered to the War Shipping Administration on 29 March. She was stricken from the Naval Vessel Register on 17 April and sold to Pinto Island Metals Company for scrapping on 21 January 1947.
