= Pike, New York (disambiguation) =

Pike, New York is the name of two locations in Wyoming County, New York:

- Pike (hamlet), New York
- Pike (town), New York
