= Matthew Ewing =

American carpenter and inventor

- Born: January 10, 1815; Flloyd, New York
- Died: December 31, 1874 (aged 59); Monroe County, New York
- Occupations: Businessman, inventor, farmer
- Spouse: Sara Ewing (m. 1839)
- Children: 4

Matthew Ewing (January 10, 1815 – 1874) was an American carpenter and inventor. He is known as the cofounder of the Vacuum Oil Company with business partner Hiram Bond Everest.

== Biography ==
Ewing was born January 10, 1815, in Floyd, New York. The Ewing family moved to Rochester, New York, in 1857. During the Civil War, he enlisted alongside his son in Co. G of the 108th NY Infantry. Ewing was a carpenter by trade, and also an inventor.

After the Civil War, Ewing invented a vacuum distillation method for producing kerosene from crude oil. The byproduct of the process was a residue that became a superior lubricant. His invention was patented and with the financial backing of Hiram Bond Everest, he founded the Vacuum Oil Company in 1866. Ewing later sold his share in the company to Everest.

=== Marriage and children ===
Matthew and Sarah Ewing married c. 1839 and had 4 children: Emma, Mary, George P. and Alma.

=== Death and afterward ===
Ewing died in 1874. In 1879 the Standard Oil Co. purchased a three-quarters interest in Vacuum Oil Company for $200,000. As a lubricants pioneer, Vacuum Oil introduced revolutionary products, such as Gargoyle 600-W Steam Cylinder Oil. The Standard Oil company grew into what is today known as ExxonMobil.
