= First Free Will Baptist Church of Pike =

Historic church in New York, United States

- U.S. National Register of Historic Places
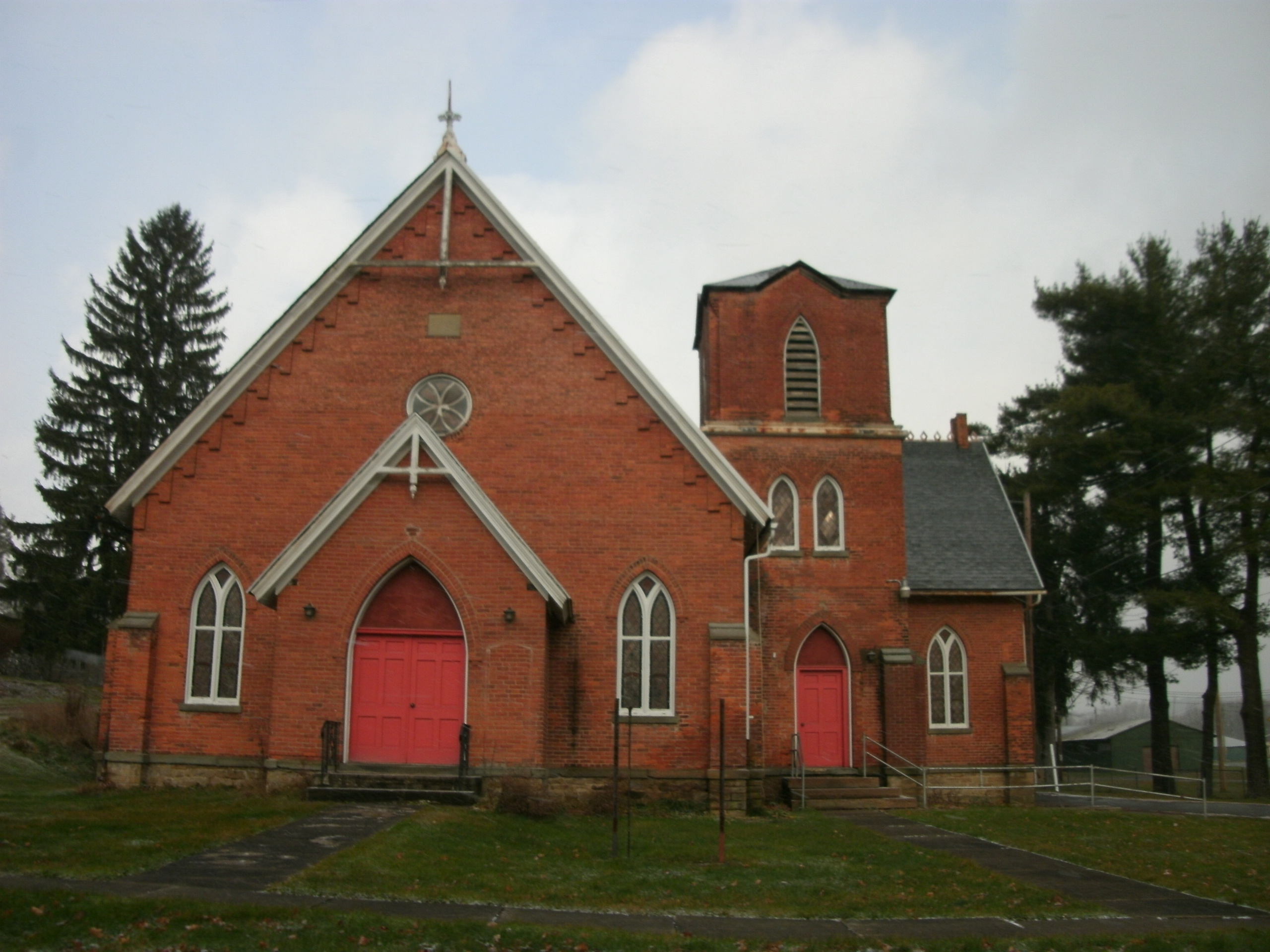
- First Free Will Baptist Church of Pike, November 2010

- Location within New York Location within the United States
- Location: 72 Main St., Pike, New York
- Coordinates: 42°33′17″N 78°09′21″W
- Area: less than one
- Built: 1881, 1917, 1926
- Architectural style: Late Victorian Gothic
- NRHP reference No.: 12000369
- Added to NRHP: June 27, 2012

First Free Will Baptist Church of Pike is a historic Baptist church located at Pike, Wyoming County, New York. It was built in 1881, and is a one-story, L-shaped brick building with a steep gable roof in a Late Victorian Gothic style. It sits on a stone foundation and has a bell tower. A baptistry was added in 1917 and a rear addition in 1926.

It was added to the National Register of Historic Places in 2012.
