= Kaweah-class oiler =

Class of United States Navy oilers

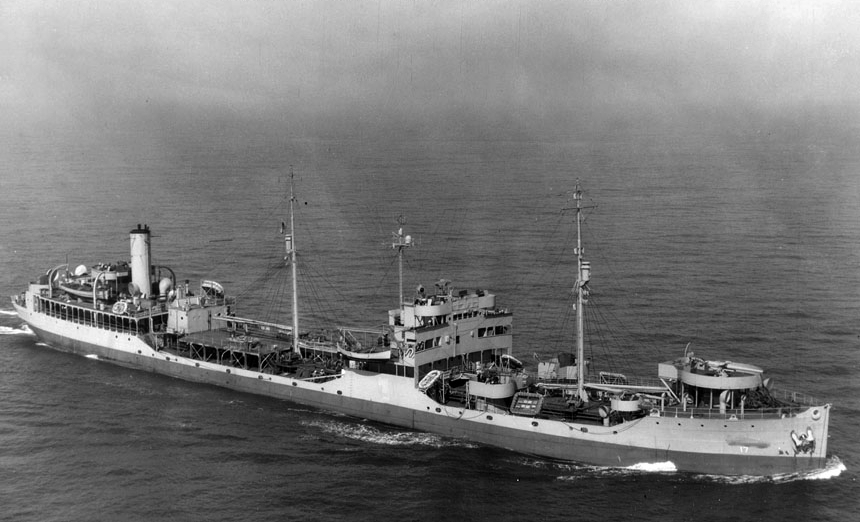
- USS Mattole

Class overview
- Name: Kaweah class
- Builders: William Cramp & Sons
- Operators: United States Navy
- Preceded by: Patoka class
- Succeeded by: Cimarron class
- Subclasses: Alameda class
- Built: 1918–1921
- In commission: 1919–1946
- Planned: 4
- Completed: 4
- Retired: 4

General characteristics
- Type: Oil tanker
- Displacement: 4,410 long tons (4,481 t) light; 14,450 long tons (14,682 t) full load
- Length: 446 ft (136 m)
- Beam: 58 ft (18 m) (waterline)
- Draft: 25 ft 6 in (7.77 m) (mean)
- Depth: 33 ft 3 in (10.13 m)
- Installed power: 2,800 shp (2,100 kW)
- Propulsion: 1 × triple-expansion steam engine; 1 × shaft
- Speed: 11 knots (20 km/h)
- Capacity: 1,000 tons
- Complement: 252
- Armament: 2 × single 5-inch/38-caliber guns; 2 × dual Bofors 40 mm guns; 2 × dual Oerlikon 20 mm cannons

The Kaweah-class oiler was a class of oil tankers of United States Navy during the Second World War.

== Development ==
Four oilers were ordered for construction by the William Cramp & Sons, Philadelphia. These ships were the remaining four 1917 program oilers, 5450/14,500-ton tankers built to USSB Design 1128 between 1919 and 1921. Similar in size and speed to the Patoka, Alameda, and Kaweah classes also served principally as transport tankers.

== Ships of class ==
Hull number	Name	Callsign	Builders	Launched	Commissioned	Decommissioned	Fate
Alameda-class oiler
AO-10	Alameda	NJRS	William Cramp & Sons	15 July 1919	17 October 1919	29 March 1946	Scrapped on 21 January 1947
Kaweah-class oiler
AO-15	Kaweah	NUGK	William Cramp & Sons	1919	28 December 1921	16 November 1945	Scrapped on 28 May 1946
AO-16	Laramie	NUGL	William Cramp & Sons		28 December 1921	16 November 1945	Scrapped on 28 May 1946
AO-17	Mattole	NUGM	William Cramp & Sons	16 March 1920	28 December 1921	25 October 1945	Scrapped on 28 May 1946
