= Nelson Winch Green =

American inventor and author

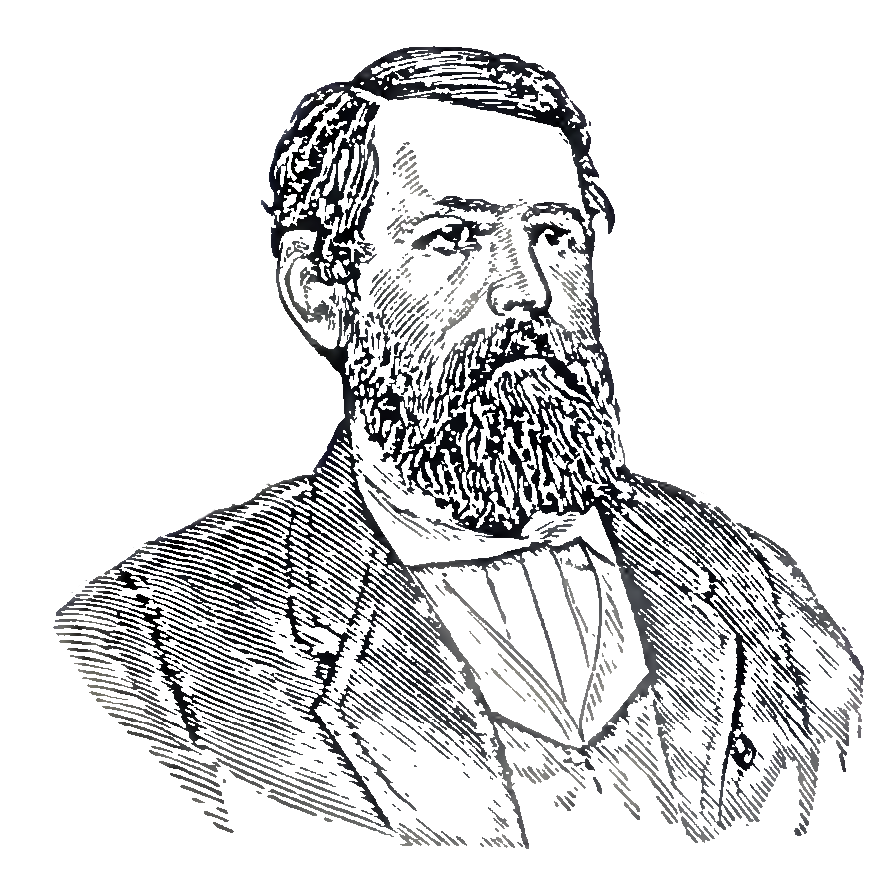
- Born: July 13, 1819; Pike, New York, U.S.
- Died: May 11, 1907 (aged 87); Stoneham, Massachusetts, U.S.
- Burial place: Lindenwood Cemetery, Stoneham, Massachusetts
- Education: West Point Academy
- Occupations: Journalist, Author, Lawyer, Inventor
- Known for: Invention of the tube well

Nelson Winch Green (July 13, 1819 – May 11, 1907) was an American author, lawyer, inventor, and Civil War officer.

== Early life ==
Nelson Winch Green was born July 13, 1819, in Pike, New York. On his father's side, he was a descendant of Major General Nathanael Greene. His early education was at the private school of Harley F. Smith of Pike, New York. He entered West Point Academy in September, 1839.

Green completed over three years of study at West Point but was injured during artillery drill and had to withdraw several months before graduation. After leaving West Point he studied law with James R. Doolittle in Wyoming County, New York. Following this, he became an insurance agent in Dansville, New York, and then together with local leading businessmen, purchased the Dansville Herald where he ran the business and editorial departments of the paper. In 1859 he moved to Cortland, New York.

== Civil War Service ==
After the Battle of Bull Run in July 1861, Green organized the Seventy-Sixth Regiment for the Union Army with volunteers from Cortland and surrounding areas. He was appointed Colonel of the regiment on October 29, 1861. However, Captain Andrew J. McNett felt he should have been given leadership of the unit. On December 6, 1861, in a dispute involving accusations of insubordination, Green shot McNett in the neck with a Smith and Wesson revolver. McNett's wound was not fatal, but Green was removed from command in March 1862.

== Invention of tube well and patent disputes ==
At the Cortland County Fair, in October 1861, Green demonstrated a method for obtaining pure water for his army troops by pounding a steel rod into the ground. This was apparently the first military use of the tube well for accessing groundwater. When the war was over, Green worked with Cowling and & Co of Seneca Falls, New York, which manufactured and distributed well drilling equipment. Green applied for a patent for this method of groundwater extraction. Green originally applied for the patent on March 17, 1866; it was granted in 1868. While his tube well patent was pending in the United States, Green sold the British rights to the tube well to James Lee Norton, an industrialist and inventor from London. Norton promoted the new American tube well to the British Army, where it was used extensively in the Abyssinian Campaign and became known as the Abyssinian Well.

For some years, Green collected licensing fees for his tube well patent through his partnerships with Cowing & Co. of Cortland and later William and George Andrews. However, the legitimacy of his patent came into question after a number of claims were made that the tube well had come into general use before Green registered his patent. In documents presented to the United States Supreme Court, it was noted that Green had publicly demonstrated his tube well in Cortland, New York in October 1861, but had not sought to patent it until 1866. The Supreme Court eventually ruled that since the technology was known and used in Cortland after 1861, the 1868 patent was invalid.

Some have claimed that it was not Green at all who invented the tube well, but rather that the knowledge of the technology was general in the region, or that Green had gotten the idea from Harley Lord who allegedly built a tube well before 1852 in Dansville, New York when Green was working there. Notably, salt manufacture had been practiced in the region from before the arrival of European settlers. In the early 1800s, deep wells were being sunk throughout the region to access salt brine. The drilled salt wells may have been the inspiration for Green's tube well.

== Fifteen Years’ Residence with the Mormons ==
In 1859, Green was involved in the publishing of the book Fifteen Years’ Residence with the Mormons. The book was presented as the memoirs of Mary Ettie V. Smith, an early Mormon who eventually left the church. Green wrote the preface of the book and is understood to be the editor, although some have suggested that he may have done more than simply edit the manuscript.

== Other writings ==
Green was also the author of an early speculative paper conjecturing the movements of water in underground springs. His essay “Why do springs and wells overflow” was published in the journal Popular Science Monthly in November, 1879.
