= USS Sapelo =

Oiler of the United States Navy

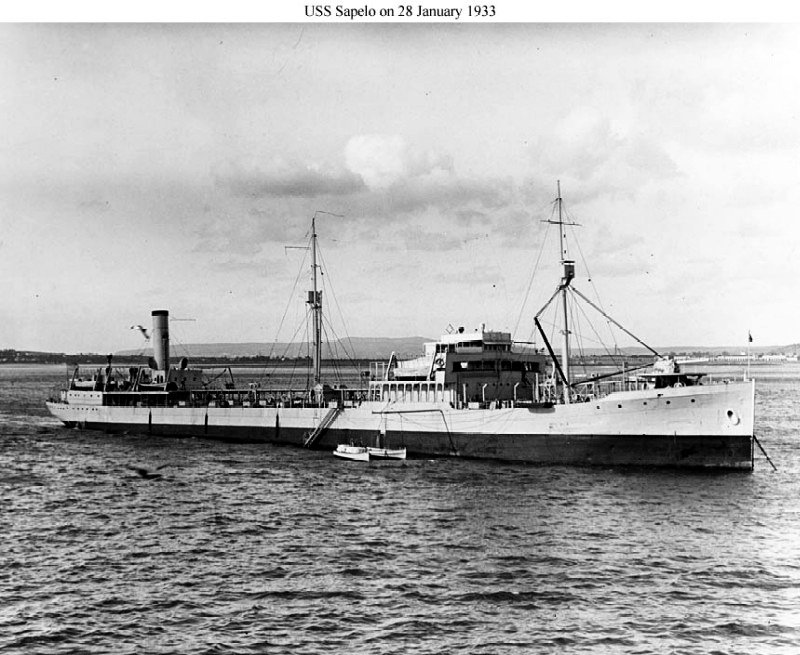

History

United States
- Name: Sapelo
- Namesake: Sapelo River in Georgia
- Builder: Newport News Shipbuilding and Dry Dock Co.
- Laid down: 3 May 1919
- Launched: 24 December 1919
- Acquired: 30 January 1920
- Commissioned: 19 February 1920
- Decommissioned: 14 October 1933
- Recommissioned: 19 August 1940
- Decommissioned: 26 October 1945
- Stricken: 13 November 1945
- Fate: Sold for scrap, May 1946

General characteristics
- Class & type: Patoka Replenishment oiler
- Displacement: 16,500 long tons (16,765 t) full
- Length: 477 ft 10 in (145.64 m)
- Beam: 60 ft 3 in (18.36 m)
- Draft: 26 ft 2 in (7.98 m)
- Speed: 10.5 knots (19.4 km/h; 12.1 mph)
- Complement: 75 officers and enlisted
- Armament: 2 × 5 in (130 mm) guns

USS Sapelo (AO-11) was a Patoka-class fleet replenishment oiler of the United States Navy. Laid down on 3 May 1919 for the United States Shipping Board by the Newport News Shipbuilding and Dry Dock Co., Newport News, Virginia, the ship was launched on 24 December 1919, transferred to the Navy on 30 January 1920, and commissioned on 19 February 1920.

== Service history ==
=== 1920–1933 ===
After carrying fuel oil from Texas ports to shore stations in Panama, Cuba, and on the east coast, Sapelo completed her first transatlantic run, to the Firth of Clyde with oil for the British Admiralty, in June 1920. On her return, she remained in American waters through mid-August; then loaded fuel oil, gasoline, and stores for store ships and shore stations supporting United States Navy ships operating in Adriatic and Turkish waters. During September, she delivered cargo at Constantinople, Constanţa, Venice, and Split. From there, she proceeded to Brest where she received American war dead to return to the United States.

On 29 October, Sapelo arrived at New York City and, for the next four years, alternately operated along the gulf coast, in the Caribbean, and along the east coast, with semi-annual one-to-three-month tours in the Mediterranean–Middle East area. In April 1924, she transited the Panama Canal and proceeded to San Pedro, California. From there, she refueled ships conducting exercises off the California, Mexican, and Panamanian coasts and carried fuel to shore bases in the Canal Zone. In June, she returned to the east coast; underwent overhaul; and, in August, resumed gulf coast-east coast-Caribbean shuttle runs.

In January 1925, she returned to the Pacific for winter maneuvers; then, in April, departed San Francisco for Hawaii to support units participating in joint Army-Navy exercises. During May and June, she carried fuel oil and gasoline from California to Hawaii; and, in July, she carried her vital cargo to Samoa. On the 21st, she returned to Pearl Harbor; but, by the middle of August, was again en route west. After a stop at Wellington, N.Z., she once more delivered petroleum products to Samoa; and, on 1 September, she departed Tutuila to return to the United States.

By mid-October, Sapelo had resumed shuttling fuel from the Texas oil ports to bases in the Caribbean and along the east coast. In late November 1926, she again transited the Panama Canal; loaded fuel oil in California; delivered her cargo to Canal Zone depots; and returned to the Atlantic for operations along the coast, in the Caribbean, and the Gulf of Mexico.

For the next three years, she maintained a similar schedule. Most of her time was spent on the east coast, on the gulf coast, and in the Caribbean with runs, at least twice a year, into the Pacific to carry fuel, supplies, and personnel from California to the Canal Zone and Nicaragua. In 1929, she interrupted this schedule to carry fuel and torpedoes to the Philippines before returning to the United States to resume her previous operations.

In July 1932, the oiler was transferred to the Pacific. In mid-August, she arrived at San Pedro and, for the next seven months, operated along the California coast with periodic fuel, freight, and passenger runs to Pearl Harbor. In April 1933, she departed California for the east coast and, in mid-June, arrived in Philadelphia where she was decommissioned on 14 October.

=== 1940–1945 ===
Six years later, World War II broke out in Europe; and Sapelo was ordered activated. Recommissioned on 19 August 1940, she was assigned to Train, Atlantic Fleet, and homeported at Norfolk. Into the spring of 1941, she carried petroleum cargoes along the gulf and east coasts. That summer, she extended her runs to Nova Scotia, Newfoundland, and Greenland. In the fall, she commenced runs to Iceland; and, on 7 December 1941, she was at sea, en route from NS Argentia to Reykjavík, Iceland.

Into the winter of 1943, she continued to carry vital fuels to ships and shore stations in Canada, Newfoundland, and Iceland. Then, in late March, she departed Boston to deliver fuel oil, aviation gas, and ammunition to Loch Ewe, Scotland. On 15 April, she turned westward with salt water ballast and a partial cargo of ammunition. On the 19th, she arrived at Reykjavík; and, on the 24th, she departed Iceland to join convoy ONS 5. Two days later, the rendezvous was completed, and the convoy of 43 merchant ships moved west on a course to maximize air coverage from bases on Iceland, Greenland, and Newfoundland.

Further west, 47 German submarines, organized into Groups "Star," "Specht," and "Amsel," were positioning themselves along projected convoy courses between Iceland and Newfoundland. On the 29th, a unit of "Star" located ONS 5 and relayed the information.

The signals were picked up by the convoy's escorts; and, that night, they drove off the first U-boat attack. The slow convoy continued west. Merchant ships began showing breakdown lights. Escorts began to deplete their fuel tanks. Heavy seas precluded refueling while underway.

By 4 May, 10 ships had dropped out of the main convoy body and had been organized into two straggler groups. The convoy's screen had been reduced to seven ships. Four additional U-boats joined the attacking units, who were reorganized and repositioned to trap the convoy between Cape Farewell on the southern tip of Greenland and Flemish Cap, some 300 nautical miles (600 km) east of Cape Race, Newfoundland.

Just prior to 2100 on 4 May, the escort ahead of the convoy dropped three depth charges. For over 30 hours, the convoy came under continuous attack. The escorts fought back, assisted by land-based aircraft; but ships ahead of, astern of, and to starboard of Sapelo were hit.

On the night of 5 and 6 May, after the convoy entered a fog bank, German accuracy dropped off. The U-boats waited for morning, but the fog continued to shield the survivors of ONS 5. At mid-morning on the 6th, the German attack was called off. The U-boats retired eastward. They had sunk 13 merchantmen. The escorts of ONS—5 had sunk five U-boats; Allied aircraft, one.

Sapelo arrived at New York on 15 May. An overhaul period followed; and, in July, she resumed resupply runs to bases in the Maritime Provinces and Newfoundland. In September, she shifted south to the Caribbean and through the fall shuttled petroleum products from Aruba and Curaçao to the east coast. In December, she moved north again; shuttled fuels to Canadian ports; then, with the spring of 1944, commenced plying routes between the gulf coast, the east coast, and Bermuda. That summer, she again crossed the Atlantic; and, in September, she resumed operations along the east and gulf coasts, to Bermuda, and into the Caribbean which she continued until the end of World War II.

=== Decommissioning and disposal ===
With the end of the war, Sapelo was designated for disposal. In September 1945, she reported to Commander, 5th Naval District for inactivation. On 26 October 1945, she was decommissioned; and, on 13 November, her name was struck from the Navy List. She was sold, via the War Shipping Administration to the Patapsco Scrap Co., in May 1946.
