= 76th New York Infantry Regiment =

- State flag from 1778 to 1901
- Active: September 2, 1861 to January 28, 1865
- Country: United States
- Allegiance: Union
- Branch: Infantry
- Nickname: Cortland County Regiment
- Engagements: American Civil War: Battle of Gainesville; Second Battle of Bull Run; Battle of South Mountain; Battle of Antietam; Battle of Fredericksburg; Battle of Chancellorsville; Battle of Gettysburg; Bristoe Campaign; Mine Run Campaign; Battle of the Wilderness; Battle of Spotsylvania Court House; Battle of Cold Harbor; Siege of Petersburg; Battle of Globe Tavern; Battle of Boydton Plank Road

Commanders
- Colonel: Nelson W. Green
- Colonel: William P. Wainwright
- Colonel: Charles E. Livingston

Insignia
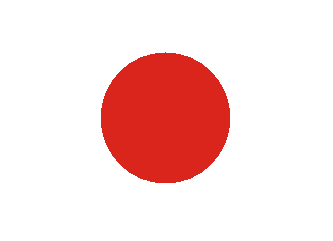
- 1st Division, I Corps

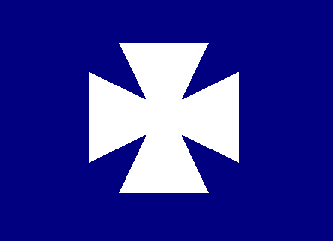
- 2nd Division, V Corps

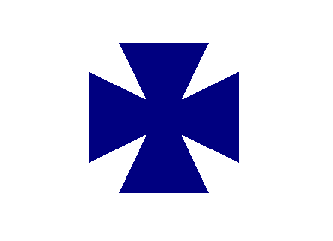
- 3rd Division, V Corps

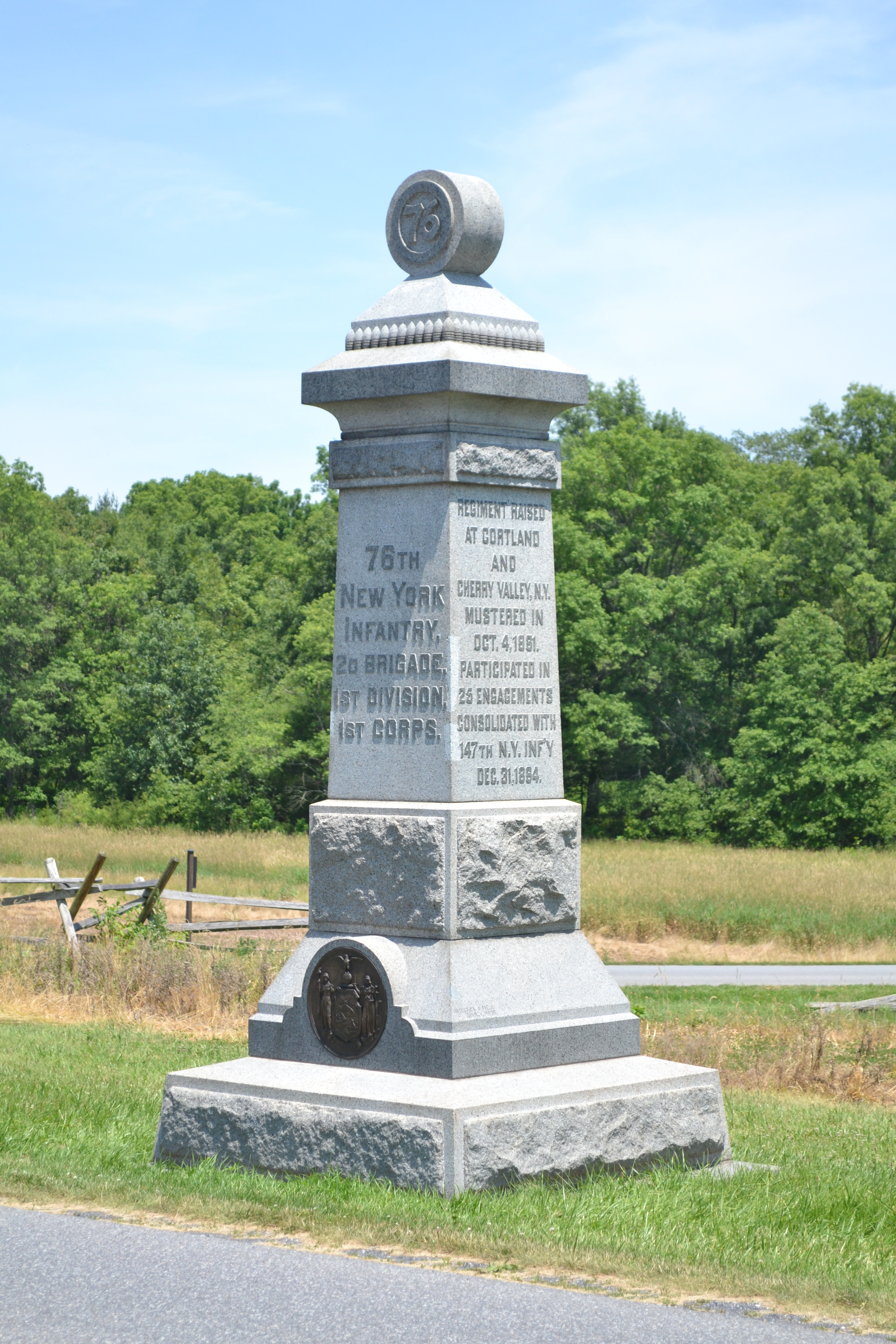
Monument to the 76th New York Volunteer Infantry at Gettysburg

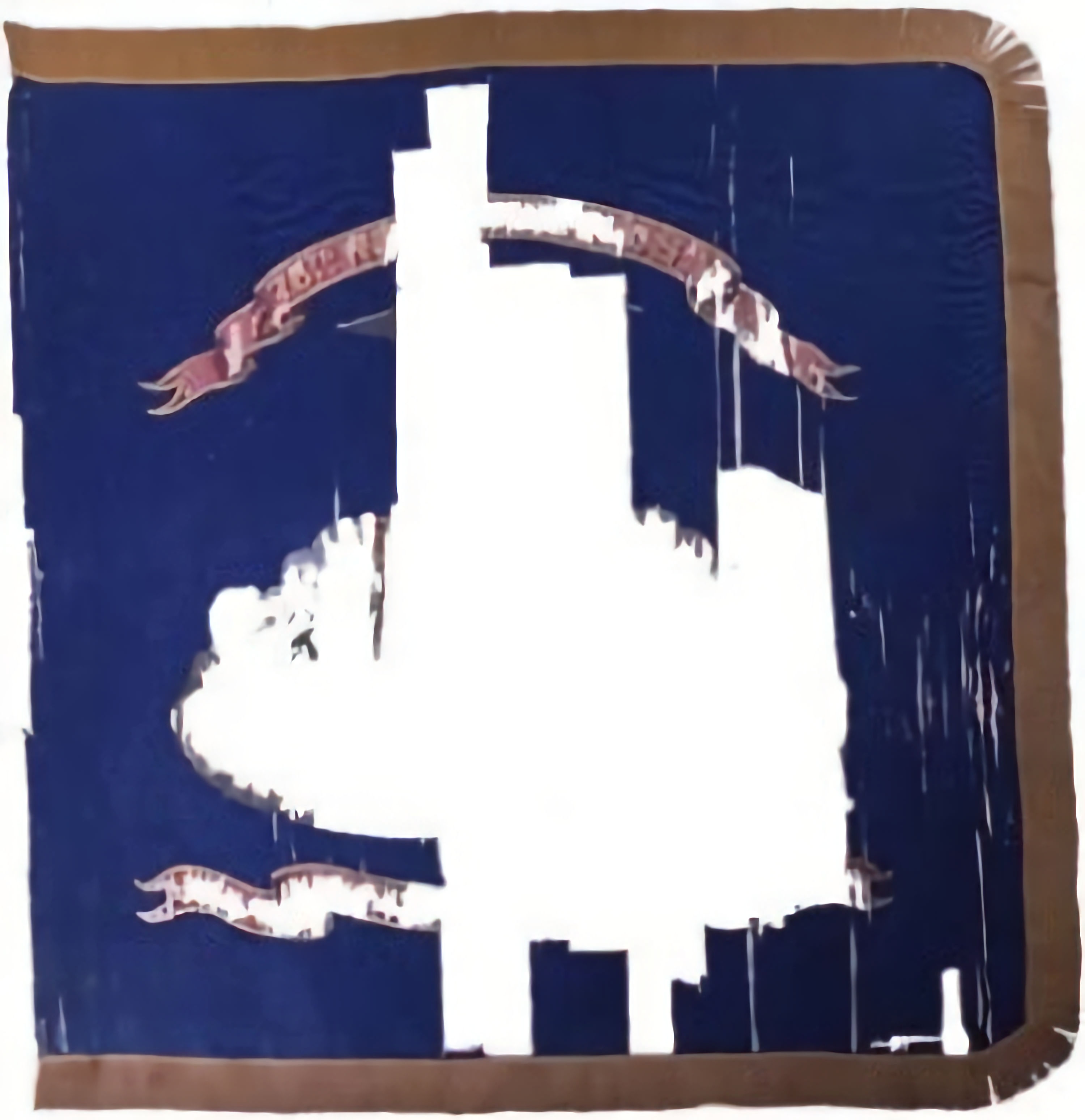
76th New York Infantry Regimental colors

The 76th New York Infantry Regiment ("Cortland County Regiment") was an infantry regiment in the Union Army during the American Civil War.

== Organization ==
The 76th New York Infantry was organized at Cortland and Albany, New York, beginning September 2, 1861, and mustered in for three years service on January 16, 1862, under the command of Colonel Nelson W. Green. (The first company of the regiment was mustered in on October 4, 1861.)

The regiment was attached to 3rd Brigade, Casey's Division, Army of the Potomac, to March 1862. Wadsworth's Command, Military District of Washington, to May 1862. Doubleday's Brigade, Department of the Rappahannock, to June 1862. 2nd Brigade, 1st Division, III Corps, Army of Virginia, to September 1862. 2nd Brigade, 1st Division, I Corps, Army of the Potomac, to January 1864. 1st Brigade, 1st Division, I Corps, to March 1864. 2nd Brigade, 1st Division, I Corps, to March 1864. 2nd Brigade, 4th Division, V Corps, to August 1864. 3rd Brigade, 2nd Division, V Corps, to September 1864. 3rd Brigade, 3rd Division, V Corps, to January 1865.

Companies mustered out as follows: Companies B, F, and K on July 1, 1864; Company A on October 11, 1864; Company G on October 20, 1864; Company C on November 8, 1864; Company E on November 18, 1864; Company I on December 1, 1864; Company H on January 1, 1865; Company D, veterans, and recruits were transferred to 147th New York Infantry on January 28, 1865 and the 76th New York Infantry ceased to exist.

== Service ==
Left New York for Washington, D.C., January 17, 1862. Duty in the defenses of Washington D.C., until May 1862. Duty at and near Fredericksburg, Va., until August. Pope's Campaign in northern Virginia August 16-September 2. Fords of the Rappahannock August 20–23. Battles of Gainesville August 2 Groveton August 29, Bull Run August 30. Maryland Campaign September 6–22. Battles of South Mountain September 14; Antietam September 16–17. At Sharpsburg, Md., until October 29. Advance to Falmouth, Va., October 29-November 19. Battle of Fredericksburg, Va., December 12–15. "Mud March" January 20–24, 1863. At Falmouth and Belle Plains until April 27. Chancellorsville Campaign April 27-May 6. Operations at Pollock's Mill Creek April 29-May 2. Battle of Chancellorsville May 2–5. Gettysburg Campaign June 11-July 24. Battle of Gettysburg, July 1–3. Pursuit of Lee to Manassas Gap, Va., July 5–24. Duty on line of the Rappahannock until October. Bristoe Campaign October 9–22. Advance to line of the Rappahannock November 7–8. Mine Run Campaign November 26-December 2. Demonstration on the Rapidan February 6–7, 1864. Campaign from the Rapidan to the James River May 3-June 15. Battle of the Wilderness May 5–7; Laurel Hill May 8; Spotsylvania May 8–12; Spotsylvania Court House May 12–21. Assault on the Salient May 12. North Anna River May 23–26. Jericho Ford May 23. On line of the Pamunkey May 26–28. Totopotomoy May 28–31. Cold Harbor June 1–12. Bethesda Church June 1–3. Before Petersburg June 16–18. Siege of Petersburg June 16, 1864, to January 28, 1865. Weldon Railroad August 18–21, 1864. Poplar Springs Church September 29-October 2. Boydton Plank Road, Hatcher's Run, October 27–28. Hicksford Raid December 7–11.

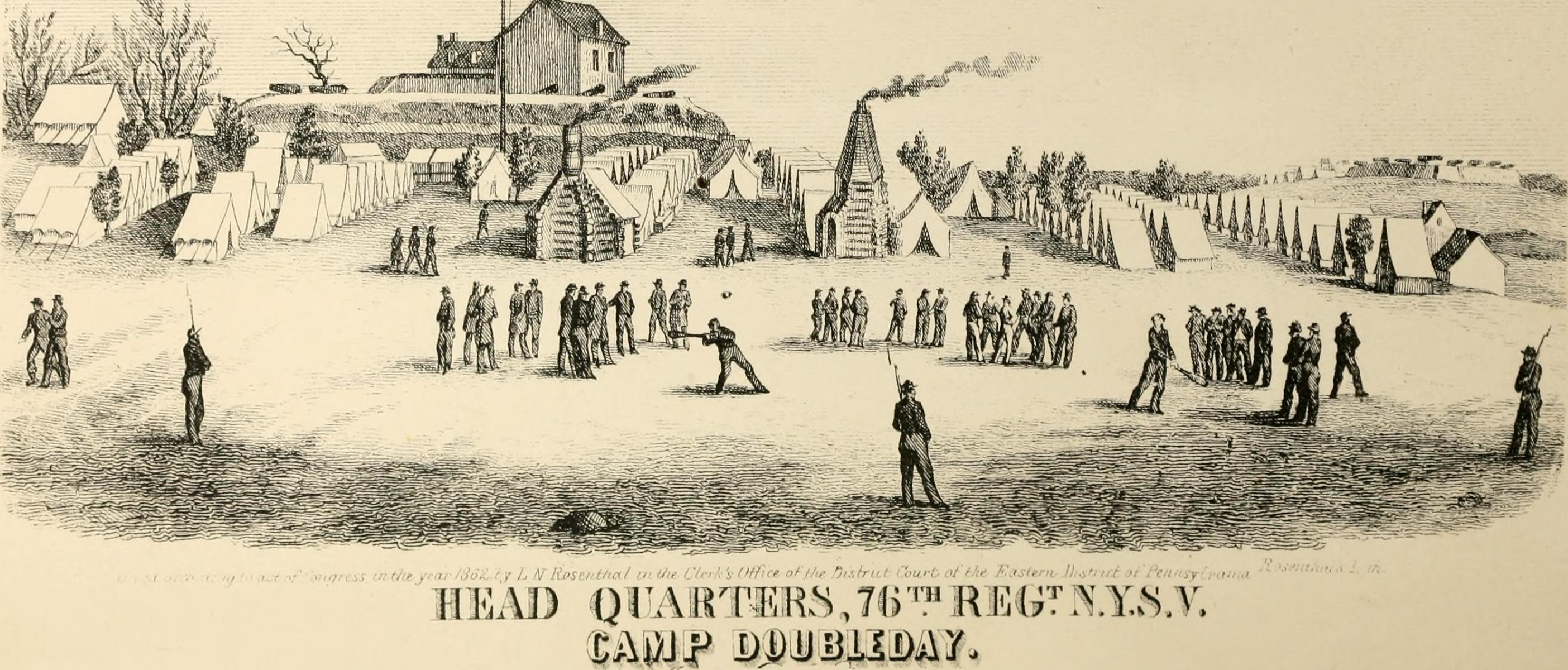
Headquarters of the 76th New York Volunteer Infantry, Camp Doubleday

== Casualties ==
The regiment lost a total of 330 men during service; 12 officers and 161 enlisted men killed or mortally wounded, 1 officer and 156 enlisted men died of disease.

== Commanders ==
- Colonel Nelson W. Green - called before a court of review in March 1862 by the officers of the regiment and ordered to be mustered out of the service by the War Department
- Colonel William P. Wainwright
- Colonel Charles E. Livingston
- Lieutenant Colonel John E. Cook - commanded at the Battle of Gettysburg while still at the rank of captain following the death of Maj. Grover
- Major Andrew J. Grover - commanded at the Battle of Gettysburg; killed early in action on July 1, 1863
- Captain John W. Young - commanded at the Battle of Antietam

== Notable members ==
- John G. Farnsworth, Adjutant General of New York

== See also ==
- List of New York Civil War regiments
- New York in the Civil War

== Sources ==
- Dyer, Frederick H. A Compendium of the War of the Rebellion (Des Moines, IA: Dyer Pub. Co.), 1908.
- Smith, Abram P. History of the Seventy-Sixth Regiment New York Volunteers (Cortland, NY: Truair, Smith and Miles), 1867. [reprinted in 1988]

Attribution
