= Hiram Bond Everest =

American businessman and inventor

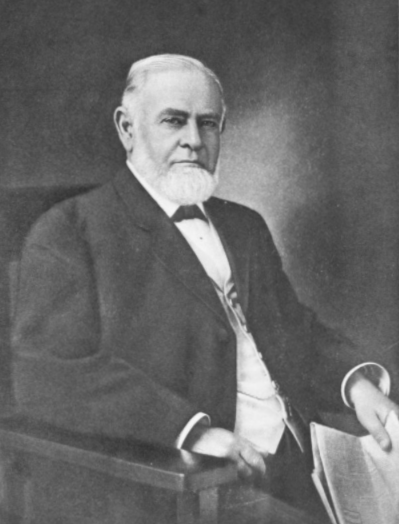
- Born: April 11, 1830; Pike, New York
- Died: March 5, 1913 (aged 82); Los Angeles, California
- Occupations: Businessman, farmer
- Spouse: Mercy Eleanor Everest (m. 1852)
- Children: 4

Hiram Bond Everest (April 11, 1830 – March 5, 1913) was an American businessman, investor, inventor and farmer.

== Biography ==
Hiram Bond Everest was born in Pike, New York on April 11, 1830. He moved to Wisconsin around age 18 to work as a teacher of science until 1853, when he moved to Rochester, New York. There he established a grocery business.

He married Mercy Eleanor Everest on January 1, 1852, and they had four children.

Later, with a business partner Matthew Ewing, the Vacuum Oil Company was incorporated in 1866, after obtaining a patent for a new method of distilling kerosene in a vacuum that produced a high-quality lubricant byproduct. It had been the company's intention to produce kerosene but they found a greater competitive advantage for their lubricants. Everest and the Vacuum Oil Company patented several inventions. Everest subsequently leased 10,000 acres (40 km^{2}) for the company in Oatka Valley, New York and was reputed to be a multi-millionaire. Everest died at age 82 in Los Angeles, California and is buried at Mount Hope Cemetery in Rochester.

== Diary excerpt ==
Wyoming, New York. December 31, 1845.

Before commencing a history of my great and magnamious [sic?] life in the form of a journal or diary, perhaps it would be well to give a short sketch of it previous to this time, according to the best of my recollection, and of all the information which I can get upon the subject. I was born upon Sunday the eleventh day of April in the year of our Lord one thousand eight hundred and thirty in the town of Pike Allegany County New York. There among the hills and the frosts of Allegany I first made my appearance in this world of trouble and vexation of spirit, undoubtedly of very small stature and miniature dimensions. At the end on one year from this time my parents removed from this place to the town of Middlebury in the County of Genesee upon a farm lying a little west of the village of Wyoming, here they remained for about two years and then, not being contented with their situation, removed to a farm lying about half way between the village of Warsaw and that of Wyoming. I have I have no recollection of events up to this period, but remember some things which happened while living at the place last mentioned. While we lived here, (which was for about three years) our folks kept a public house for the accommodation of travelers, etc., etc., but finding this to be rather a hard way of living, they bought a small farm of about 23 acres, lying in the town of Warsaw upon which they lived for about one year, until they removed to the place where we now live, about three fourths of a mile south of Wyoming Village. Up to this date we have resided at this place over seven years, at any rate I was but seven years of age when we moved here and am now in my sixteenth. During all this time I have attended school at the Academy two years in succession, and as much more at different times besides some considerable at the common school. I have always lived at home except for about six weeks which I spent with Geo S. Capwell as clerk in his store in the Village of Wyoming in the later part of the year 1845. Perhaps I might make some apologies for writing this short sketch of my life, but I will not; all I ask is to have you excuse the blunders, as you are aware that it is not the life of a great man which you are reading, or one written by a poet or historian.

— Hiram B. Everest
