= Pike (CDP), New York =

Pike, New York
- Hamlet and CDP
- Location within the state of New York
- Coordinates: 42°33′23″N 78°9′19″W
- Country: United States
- State: New York
- County: Wyoming
- Town: Pike
- Settled: 1806
- Incorporated: June 23, 1848
- Dissolved: December 31, 2009
- Named for: Zebulon Pike

Area
  - Total: 1.75 sq mi (4.52 km^{2})
  - Land: 1.74 sq mi (4.51 km^{2})
  - Water: 0 sq mi (0.00 km^{2})
- Elevation: 1,545 ft (471 m)

Population (2020)
  - Total: 298
  - Density: 171.0/sq mi (66.02/km^{2})
- Time zone: UTC-5 (Eastern (EST))
  - Summer (DST): UTC-4 (EDT)
- ZIP code: 14130
- Area code: 585
- FIPS code: 36-57815
- GNIS feature ID: 0960384

Pike is a hamlet and census-designated place within the Town of Pike in Wyoming County, New York, United States. The population was 371 at the 2010 census. Pike, located near the center of the town at the junction of NY 19 and NY 39, was a village from 1848 to 2009. The Wyoming County Fairgrounds are in the hamlet.

== History ==
The village was incorporated in 1848, setting itself off from the Town of Pike.

In 2008, a resolution was drafted to allow for the dissolution of the village of Pike, and a public vote was held on March 18, 2008, passing 31-5. The official dissolution took place on December 31, 2009.

The First Free Will Baptist Church of Pike was listed on the National Register of Historic Places in 2012.

== Geography ==
Pike is located at 42°33′22″N 78°9′19″W (42.556262, -78.155313).

According to the United States Census Bureau, the village had a total area of 1.0 square miles (2.6 km^{2}), of which 1.0 square mile (2.5 km^{2}) is land and 1.01% is water.

== Demographics ==
Historical population
Census	Pop.	Note	%±
2020	298		—
U.S. Decennial Census

As of the census of 2000, there were 382 people, 128 households, and 92 families residing in the village. The population density was 388.8 inhabitants per square mile (150.1/km^{2}). There were 141 housing units at an average density of 143.5 per square mile (55.4/km^{2}). The racial makeup of the village was 96.34% White, 2.09% Native American, 0.79% Asian, and 0.79% from two or more races. Hispanic or Latino of any race were 0.26% of the population.

There were 128 households, out of which 41.4% had children under the age of 18 living with them, 60.2% were married couples living together, 6.3% had a female householder with no husband present, and 28.1% were non-families. 23.4% of all households were made up of individuals, and 9.4% had someone living alone who was 65 years of age or older. The average household size was 2.98 and the average family size was 3.47.

In the village, the population was spread out, with 34.0% under the age of 18, 7.1% from 18 to 24, 26.4% from 25 to 44, 22.3% from 45 to 64, and 10.2% who were 65 years of age or older. The median age was 34 years. For every 100 females, there were 103.2 males. For every 100 females age 18 and over, there were 106.6 males.

The median income for a household in the village was $39,000, and the median income for a family was $45,000. Males had a median income of $31,000 versus $21,111 for females. The per capita income for the village was $13,840. About 3.6% of families and 9.2% of the population were below the poverty line, including 5.3% of those under age 18 and 11.4% of those age 65 or over.

== Education ==
The CDP is in the Letchworth Central School District.
