= Patoka-class oiler =

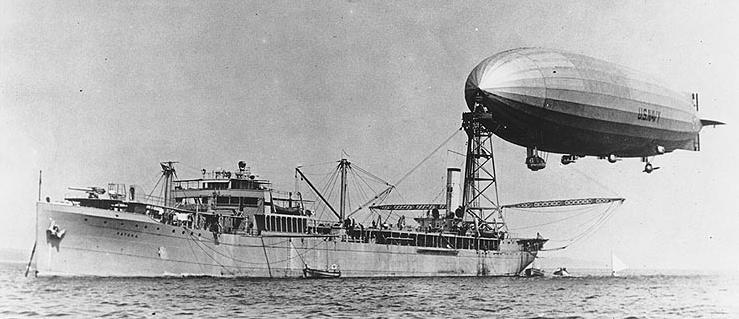
- USS Patoka with USS Shenandoah moored to her

Class overview
- Name: Patoka
- Builders: Newport News Shipbuilding and Dry Dock Co.
- Preceded by: Kanawha class
- Succeeded by: Kaweah class
- In commission: 1919–1946
- Completed: 8
- Retired: 8

General characteristics
- Type: Replenishment oiler
- Displacement: 16,800 long tons (17,070 t)
- Length: 477 ft 10 in (145.64 m)
- Beam: 60 ft (18 m)
- Draft: 26 ft 2 in (7.98 m)
- Speed: 11 knots (20 km/h; 13 mph)
- Complement: 168
- Armament: 2 × 5 in (130 mm) guns; 4 × 40 mm guns

The Patoka-class oilers were a series of eight fleet replenishment oilers built for the United States Navy after World War I. All but one of the vessels were commissioned between 1919 and 1922, and all were held in various states until the eve of World War II, where all served with the Navy for the duration of the war. All eight survived the war, after which they were decommissioned and scrapped.

== Ships in class ==
- Patoka (AO-9)
- Sapelo (AO-11)
- Ramapo (AO-12)
- Trinity (AO-13)
- Rapidan (AO-18)
- Salinas (AO-19)
- Sepulga (AO-20)
- Tippecanoe (AO-21)
