= USS Rapidan =

Oiler of the United States Navy

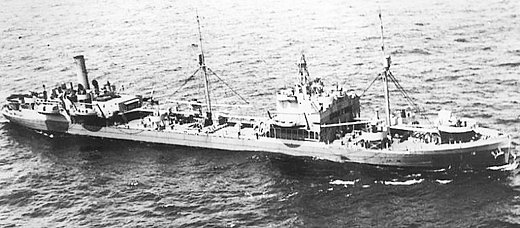
- InsertAltTextHere

History

United States
- Name: Rapidan
- Namesake: Rapidan River
- Builder: Newport News Shipbuilding & Dry Dock Co.
- Laid down: 2 February 1919
- Launched: 25 October 1919
- Acquired: 29 October 1921
- Commissioned: 1 January 1922; 22 January 1940
- Decommissioned: 22 June 1922; 17 September 1946
- Stricken: 29 October 1946
- Fate: Sold for scrap, 10 September 1947

General characteristics
- Class & type: Patoka Replenishment oiler
- Displacement: 16,800 long tons (17,070 t) (full)
- Length: 477 ft 10 in (145.64 m)
- Beam: 60 ft (18 m)
- Draft: Max. 29 ft (8.8 m)
- Speed: 11.2 knots (20.7 km/h; 12.9 mph)
- Capacity: 70,000 barrels
- Complement: 90
- Armament: 2 × single 5"/38 caliber guns; 4 × twin 20 mm guns

USS Rapidan (AO-18), was a US Navy tanker of World War II.

Rapidan was built under U.S. Shipping Board contract by the Newport News Shipbuilding & Dry Dock Co., Newport News, Virginia. It was launched on 25 October 1919 transferred to the Navy in October 1921; and commissioned as a US Navy vessel on 1 January 1922.

Assigned to the Naval Transport Service, Rapidan remained in commission for only 6 months, most of which was spent at Norfolk. Rapidan was decommissioned on 22 June 1922 and was berthed with the James River Group, Atlantic Reserve Fleet, until it was recommissioned on 22 January 1940.

For the 18 months following her second commissioning, Rapidan carried fuel from the Texas oil ports to ships and stations in the Caribbean and along the U.S. Atlantic coast.

Between September 1941 and November 1942, she supplied petroleum products to Atlantic Fleet units at Halifax, Canada, Naval Station Argentia, Newfoundland, Reykjavík and Hvalfjörður in Iceland, and various ports in Greenland. Then, after overhaul, she served as escort oiler on a convoy to Casablanca. On her return to New York, in early February 1943, Rapidan resumed operations off the northeast coast, steaming between New York, Boston, Portland, Maine, and Argentia until April when she got underway for her first Mediterranean convoy. Fueling units en route, she arrived at Gibraltar on 24 May, continued on to Oran in French North Africa, discharged her cargo, then returned to the United States and coastal operations. In July while at Norfolk Naval Shipyard, Rapidan had new, secret, Mark 29 "anti-torpedo" gear installed. In September she resumed operations in the Caribbean and on the 11th was damaged by an underwater explosion some 100 yards off the starboard quarter from a torpedo detonated by the anti-torpedo gear which resulted in damage to the hull plates. Repairs were completed at Charleston; and, on the 25th, she resumed her oil runs, operating as far south as the Netherlands West Indies, and as far north as Argentia.

In March 1944 Rapidan was ordered to the Pacific. Transiting the Panama Canal on 19 March, she steamed up the west coast to Seattle, whence she carried her liquid cargo to Kodiak, Cold Bay, Dutch Harbor, and other Aleutian ports. Including periodic assignments as station tanker at Attu and Adak, the oiler continued on the Alaskan shuttle until 28 June 1946. Then, ordered back to the east coast, she transited the Panama Canal 2 August an on 11 August reported to the 5th Naval District for inactivation.

Rapidan was decommissioned on 17 September 1946 at Portsmouth, Virginia, and transferred to the Maritime Commission on18 September 1946. Her name was struck from the Navy List 29 October 1946 and on 10 September 1947 she was sold to Northern Metals Co. for scrap.

== Monticello Miracle ==
In 2006, a horse racing track in Monticello, New York was the site of the so-called miracle, in which a racehorse hit veteran Don Karkos in the exact spot where he had been injured by shrapnel and lost sight in one of his eyes during his time on USS Rapidan. This blow caused him to regain his sight, most likely by dislodging the shrapnel.
