= USS Sepulga =

Oiler of the United States Navy

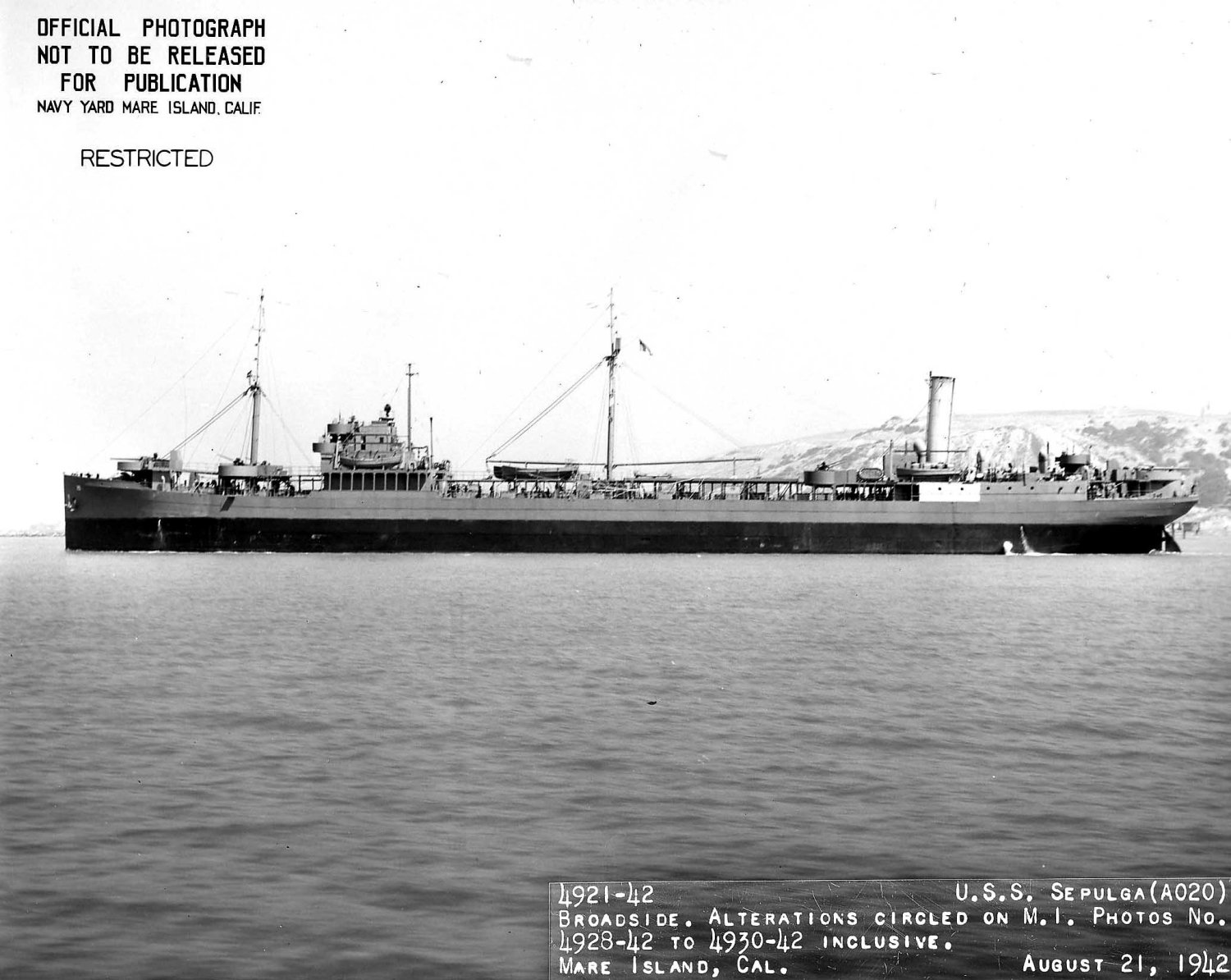

History

United States
- Name: Sepulga
- Namesake: Sepulga River in Alabama
- Builder: Newport News Shipbuilding and Dry Dock Co., Newport News, Virginia
- Launched: 21 April 1920
- Acquired: 17 October 1921
- Commissioned: 13 January 1922
- Decommissioned: 15 April 1922
- Recommissioned: 5 February 1940
- Decommissioned: 1 March 1946
- Stricken: 20 March 1946
- Fate: Sold for scrapping, 10 December 1946

General characteristics
- Class & type: Patoka Replenishment oiler
- Displacement: 16,800 long tons (17,070 t) (full)
- Length: 477 ft 10 in (145.64 m)
- Beam: 60 ft (18 m)
- Draft: Max. 29 ft (8.8 m)
- Speed: 11.2 knots (20.7 km/h; 12.9 mph)
- Capacity: 70,000 barrels
- Complement: 90
- Armament: 2 × single 5"/38 caliber guns; 4 × twin 20 mm guns

Fleetco, a Patoka Replenishment oiler built by the Newport News Shipbuilding and Dry Dock Co., Newport News, Virginia, for the United States Shipping Board (E.F.C. 1639), was launched on 21 April 1920; transferred to the Navy by Executive Order on 17 October 1921; renamed USS Sepulga (AO-20) on 2 November 1921; delivered to the Navy at Mare Island, California, on 13 December 1921.

== Service history ==
Commissioned on 13 January 1922, Sepulga was decommissioned on 15 April 1922, and laid up at Mare Island for the next 18 years. She was re-commissioned on 5 February 1940 and in March, she commenced operations for the Naval Transportation Service. Based at San Pedro, she carried fuel, general cargo, and passengers from the west coast to Guam, the Philippines, Wake Island, Midway, and Hawaii during the remaining months of peace in the Pacific. On 7 December, she was en route from San Pedro to Pearl Harbor. At mid-month, she arrived in Hawaii, where she delivered fuel to carriers Lexington (CV-2), Saratoga (CV-3), and Enterprise (CV-6). On 3 January 1942, she sailed for California to take on cargo and fuel for the Society Islands.

Upon arriving at Bora Bora on 18 February, she fueled merchant and Allied naval ships through March; then sailed for San Pedro. By mid-May, she resumed fueling duties at Bora Bora and continued them until 16 July when she again sailed for the west coast.

After reaching San Pedro on 5 August, she again departed her California base on the 24th and headed north to Dutch Harbor in the Aleutians where she dispensed petroleum products into the fall, interrupting those duties only for runs to the Seattle area to refill her tanks.

In January 1944, Sepulga returned to the Central Pacific. Temporarily assigned to ServRon 4, she arrived at Funafuti on the 15th; took on Navy and Marine passengers; and, on the 23d, got underway for Kwajalein. Arriving on 4 March, she provided fuel and water to fleet units at that atoll. Later reassigned to ServRon 10, she remained at Kwajalein into June; then moved to Eniwetok to provide similar services, to serve as receiving ship for passengers in transit, and to act as headquarters for the fuel section of her squadron. In October 1944, she proceeded to Ulithi where she served as station ship and headquarters ship through the end of the war.

On 4 November 1945, the World War I-designed oiler got underway for the United States and inactivation. Arriving at San Francisco on 29 November, she was decommissioned on 1 March 1946; struck from the Navy List on 20 March; transferred to the Maritime Commission on 1 July; and sold, for scrapping, to the National Metal and Steel Corp., on 10 December.
