= Vacuum Oil Company =

American petroleum company (1866–1931)

- Type: Private
- Industry: Petroleum
- Founded: October 4, 1866; 160 years ago
- Founder: Matthew Ewing; Hiram Everest
- Defunct: July 30, 1931; 95 years ago
- Fate: Merged with Standard Oil Company of New York (Socony) in 1931
- Successor: Socony-Vacuum (1931–99)
- Products: Gasoline, motor oils
- Brands: Mobiloil; Gargoyle
- Parent: Standard Oil (1879–1911)

Vacuum Oil Company was an American oil company. After being taken over by the original Standard Oil Company and then becoming independent again, in 1931 Vacuum Oil merged with the Standard Oil Company of New York to form Socony-Vacuum, later renamed to Mobil and eventually merging with the Standard Oil Company of New Jersey (itself renamed to Exxon) to form ExxonMobil in 1999.

== History ==
Vacuum Oil was founded in 1866 by Matthew Ewing and Hiram Bond Everest, of Rochester, New York. Lubricating oil was accidentally discovered while attempting to distill kerosene. Everest noted the residue from the extraction was suitable as a lubricant. Soon after, the product became popular for use in steam and internal-combustion engines. Ewing sold his interest to Everest, who carried on the company. Vacuum was bought by Standard Oil in 1879.

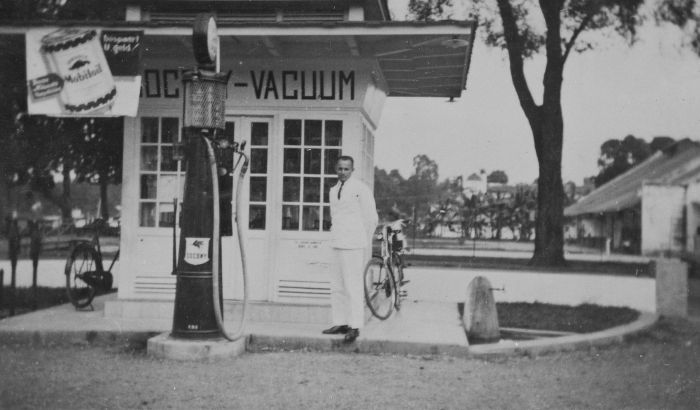
Socony-Vacuum station in the Dutch East Indies

It had used "Mobiloil" automobile lubricating oil brand since 1904, and by 1918 it became recognizable enough that the company filed it for registration as a trademark (it was registered in 1920). When Standard Oil was broken up in 1911 due to the Sherman Antitrust Act, Vacuum became an independent company again.

Vacuum Oil and Standard Oil of New York (Socony) merged in 1931, after the government gave up attempts to prevent it. The newly combined entity, Socony-Vacuum Corp, was the world's third-largest oil company.

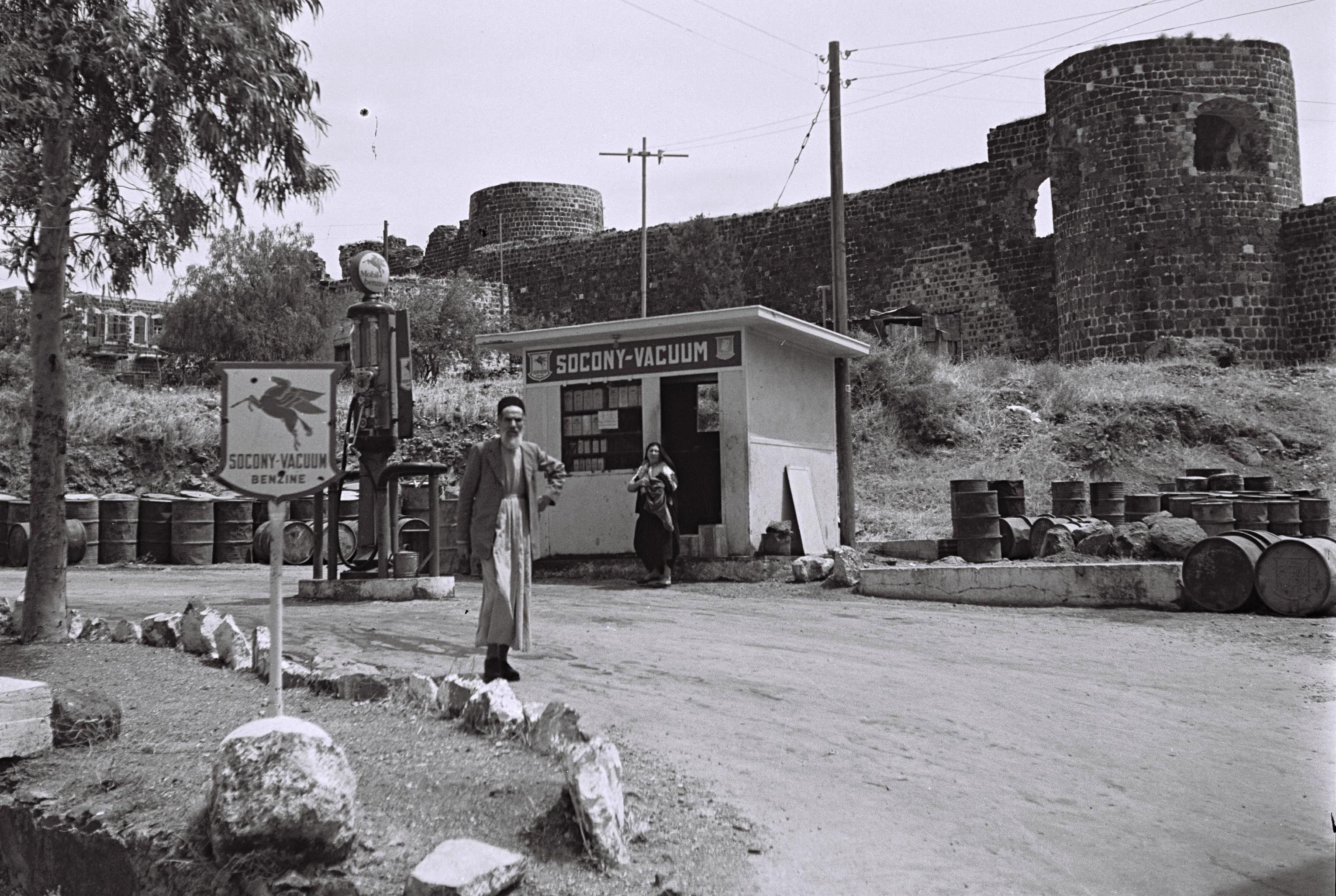
Socony-Vacuum gas station in Tiberias, Palestine, 1946

In 1933, Socony-Vacuum and Standard Oil Company of New Jersey (which had oil production and refineries in Indonesia) merged their interests in the Far East into a 50–50 joint venture. Standard Vacuum Oil Company, or "Stanvac," operated in 50 countries, including New Zealand, China, and the region of East Africa, before it was dissolved in 1962.

From november 1930 till may 1932 Vacuum Oil sponsored gasolin and oil for the [[Dornier Do X]]-flight to New York and back home.

During World War II, the Tschechowitz I & II subcamps of Auschwitz in Czechowice-Dziedzice provided forced labor for Vacuum Oil Company facilities in Poland, which had been captured and operated by Nazi Germany.

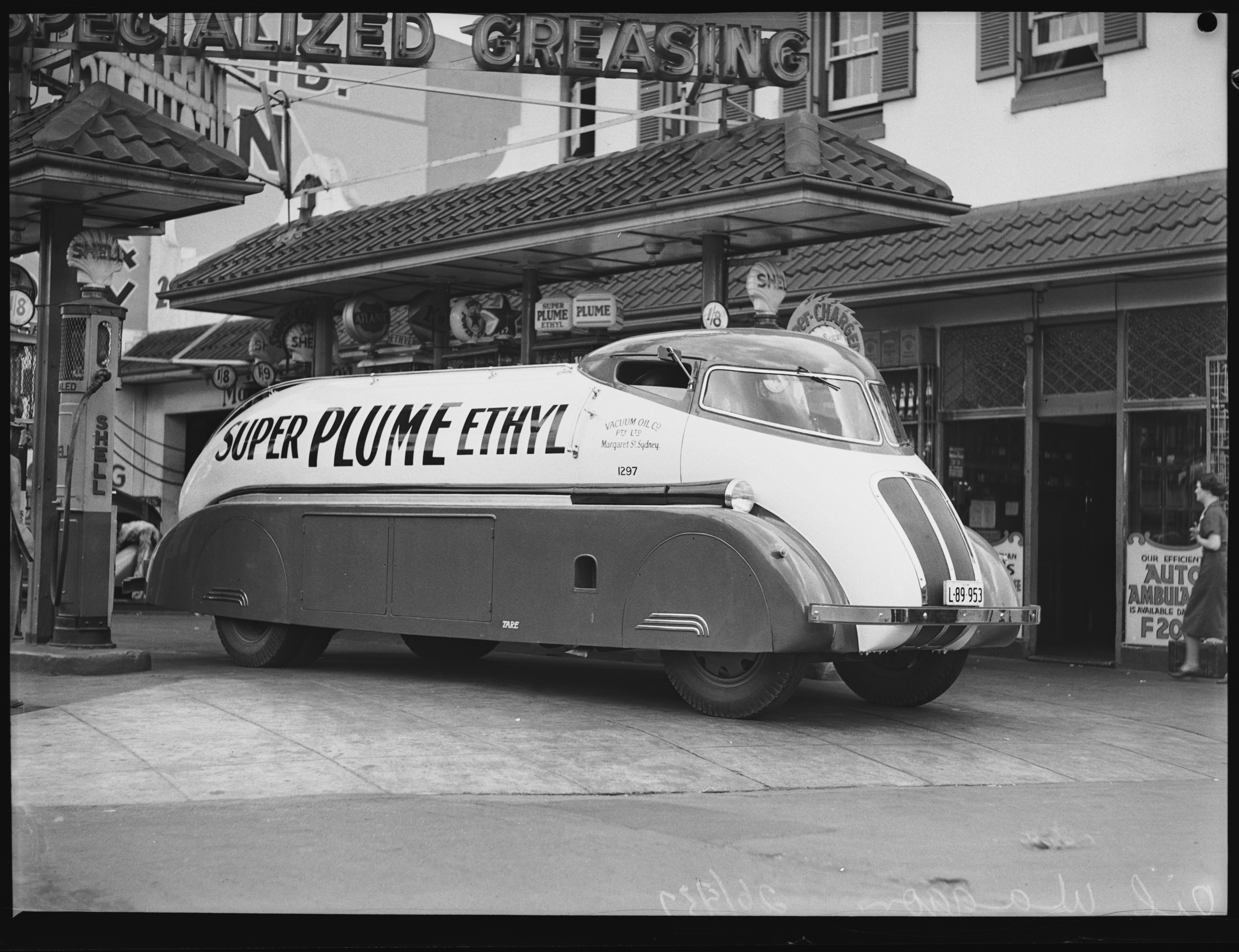
Vacuum Oil Company truck, Sydney, Australia 1937

In 1955, the company became Socony Mobil Oil Company. In 1966, it was renamed Mobil Oil Corporation, later shortened to Mobil Corporation.

== Legal challenges ==
In 1887, founder Hiram Bond Everest and son Charles M. Everest were charged with conspiracy to destroy competitor Buffalo Lubricating Oil Co. It was alleged that, having sold a three-quarter interest in their company to Standard Oil, they were attempting to destroy their rival's refinery, preventing it from manufacturing petroleum products, and from acquiring Vacuum's skilled employees. One employee who had left Vacuum to work for Buffalo was Albert A. Miller, who was bribed to sabotage the new company's plant, causing an explosion. Hiram and Charles Everest were both found guilty, but there was insufficient evidence to prove the allegation that the Everests had acted under instructions from Standard Oil.

In 1907, Vacuum Oil, Standard Oil, New York Central Railroad, and Pennsylvania Railroad were all indicted for violations in Inter-State Commerce laws. Vacuum Oil was charged with shipping 228 cars of petroleum and petroleum products to Standard Oil at unlawful rates, via the New York Central and Pennsylvania railroads.

== Leadership ==
=== President ===
- Charles M. Everest, 1906–1917
- Edward Prizer, 1917–1924
- George P. Whaley, 1924–1930
