= USS Mattole =

Oiler of the United States Navy

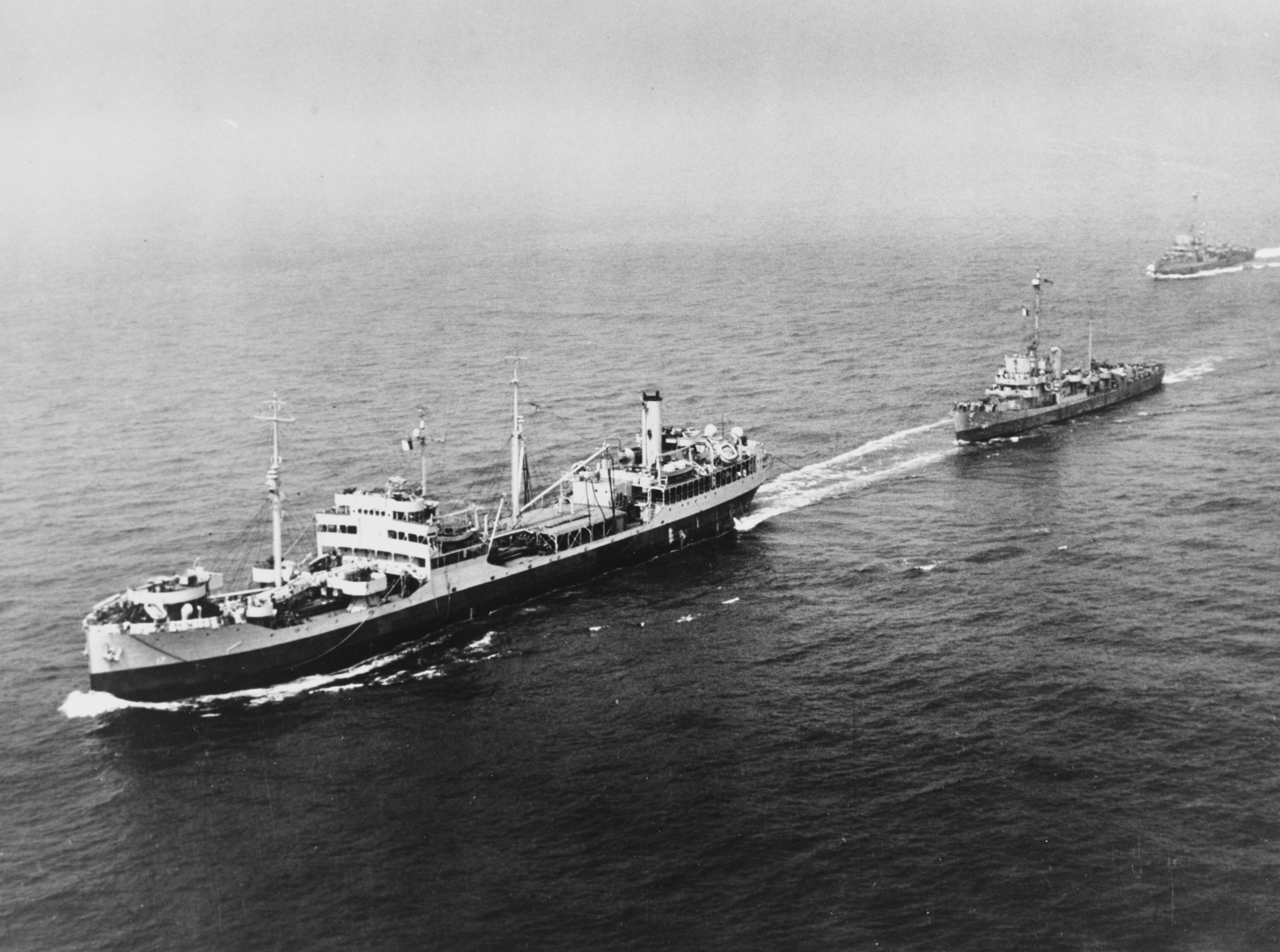
- Mattole refuels the USS Pride

History

United States
- Name: USS Mattole
- Namesake: Mattole River in California
- Laid down: 2 June 1919
- Launched: 16 March 1920
- Acquired: 6 March 1922
- Commissioned: 16 June 1940
- Decommissioned: 25 October 1945
- Stricken: 13 November 1945
- Fate: Scrapped 1 July 1947

General characteristics
- Displacement: 4,410 tons
- Length: 446 ft (136 m)
- Beam: 58 ft (18 m)
- Speed: 11 kts
- Complement: 107
- Armament: 2 5 in (130 mm); 2 3 in (76 mm)

USS Mattole (AO‑17) was a Kaweah-class fleet replenishment oiler in the United States Navy.

Mattole was built by William Cramp & Sons, Philadelphia, under USSB contract, was laid down 2 June 1919; launched 16 March 1920; acquired by the Navy 6 March 1922 and laid up at Philadelphia; commissioned 16 June 1940.

Commissioned as hostilities in Europe and Asia began to draw the United States ever closer to the conflict, Mattole was assigned to duties in the North Atlantic. Following America's entry into the war, the oiler plied between New York City, Boston, Naval Station Argentia, and Reykjavík, supplying fuel to both shore stations and ships. On 13 November 1942, she departed New York in convoy to Casablanca, arriving 1 December. She remained off the coast of north Africa until the 22d, fueling ships operating in support of the Allied offensives against Axis forces and their desire for control of the Mediterranean.

Mattole returned to New York 10 January 1943, continued to Norfolk and then to Bermuda where she underwent intensive exercises in fueling at sea, antisubmarine, and antiaircraft procedures. With this training behind her, the tanker again joined a slow, and vulnerable, supply convoy en route to Gibraltar. The convoy encountered no difficulties and Mattole returned to the United States 16 April.

On 16 June, following overhaul at Norfolk, Mattole began making runs to the oil centers of Aruba and Curaçao. Arriving in the Netherlands West Indies on the 26th, she carried oil to Guantanamo Bay and underwent fueling exercises before taking up duties as station tanker at Port of Spain, Trinidad, 20 July. She was relieved of this duty 6 September and assigned to the important task of keeping Cuban and east coast depots supplied with petroleum products. With only one interruption, she continued this essential duty sailing to Guantanamo Bay; New York; Portland, Maine; and Argentia, Newfoundland, until mid‑1945 when she extended her operations to include gulf coast ports.

The single break in this assignment came in November 1944 when she was ordered to accompany an extremely slow convoy of landing craft and tugs towing Army barges to Cherbourg, France. The convoy departed Charleston, S.C., 6 November and arrived at Plymouth, England, without incident, 5 December. The return voyage was underway by the 12th. On the 20th an enemy submarine attacked. Two ships were lost and the U‑boat, although sighted and pursued, escaped. The remaining ships rescued survivors and the convoy continued on to New York arriving 7 January 1945. Mattole then resumed her coastal and Caribbean tanker operations.

During her last month of active participation in the war effort, July 1945, the oiler carried her cargo between Houston, Galveston, and Cristobal, Canal Zone. On 3 August she departed Galveston for Philadelphia, docking there on the 9th. On 6 September she steamed to Norfolk where she decommissioned 25 October 1945. Struck from the Naval Register 13 November, she was transferred to the Maritime Commission, 7 June 1946. She was subsequently sold by that agency and delivered to the buyer, Boston Metals Co., Baltimore, Md., 1 July 1947.
