= USS Tippecanoe (AO-21) =

Oiler of the United States Navy

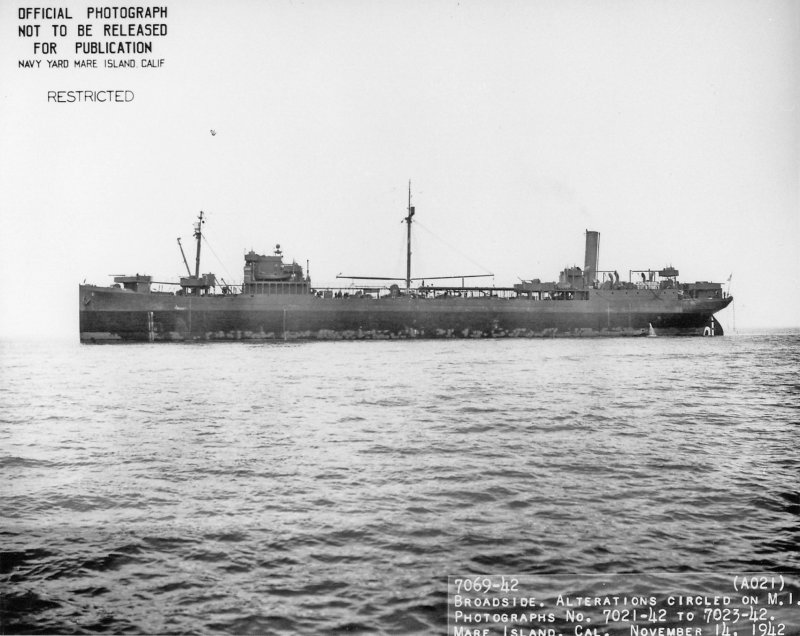
- Tippecanoe at Mare Island in November 1942

History

United States
- Name: Tippecanoe
- Namesake: Tippecanoe River
- Builder: Newport News Shipbuilding & Drydock Co., Newport News, Virginia
- Laid down: 1 October 1919
- Launched: 5 June 1920
- Acquired: 6 March 1922
- Commissioned: 6 March 1940
- Decommissioned: 6 March 1946
- Stricken: 12 April 1946
- Fate: Sold, 20 November 1946

General characteristics
- Class & type: Patoka Replenishment oiler
- Displacement: 16,800 long tons (17,070 t) full
- Length: 477 ft 10 in (145.64 m)
- Beam: 60 ft 3 in (18.36 m)
- Draft: 27 ft 8 in (8.43 m)
- Speed: 11 knots (20 km/h; 13 mph)
- Complement: 208
- Armament: 2 × 5 in (130 mm) guns; 2 × 3 in (76 mm) guns

USS Tippecanoe (AO-21) was a Patoka Replenishment oiler of the United States Navy.

== Construction and commissioning ==
Tippecanoe was laid down on 1 October 1919 at Newport News, Virginia, by the Newport News Shipbuilding & Drydock Co.; launched on 5 June 1920; delivered to the United States Shipping Board late that year; and acquired by the Navy at the Mare Island Navy Yard on 6 March 1922.

== Service history ==
Tippecanoe remained inactive at Mare Island for almost two decades before she was finally placed in commission on 6 March 1940. The oiler was assigned to Squadron 8, Base Force Train, and operated between the west coast and the Hawaiian Islands for the next two years. Her most frequent ports of call were Pearl Harbor, San Pedro, San Francisco, San Diego, and Seattle.

When the Japanese attacked Pearl Harbor on 7 December 1941, fortune ordained that Tippecanoe be safe in San Francisco. During the first three months of the war, the oiler steamed up and down the west coast between San Diego, San Pedro, San Francisco, and Seattle. She did not leave the west coast until 3 February when she headed back to Hawaii. She entered Pearl Harbor on the 17th and lay over there until 3 March when she headed for the South Pacific. After a brief stop at Pago Pago, Samoa, the ship put to sea on 15 March and headed to an area north of New Caledonia to fuel Rear Admiral Frank Jack Fletcher's Task Force 17 (TF17). She returned to the vicinity of Samoa on 26 March, visited Tongatapu on 6 April, and put into Noumea, New Caledonia, on the 26th.

On 1 May, the oiler put to sea to rendezvous with TF 17 once more. She made contact with Rear Admiral Aubrey W. Fitch's task unit—built around USS Lexington (CV-2)—and, on the 2nd and 3rd, fueled the venerable carrier and her supporting ships. Drained bone dry, Tippecanoe then headed for Efate where she arrived on 4 May, the day Rear Admiral Fletcher's USS Yorktown (CV-5) airmen struck the Japanese seaplane base at Tulagi to open the preliminaries of the historic action that stopped Japan's southward advance. During the Battle of the Coral Sea itself, Tippecanoe remained in the haven at Efate. On 8 May, she got underway and, for a time, joined Vice Admiral William F. Halsey's recently arrived TF 16—built around carriers USS Enterprise (CV-6) and USS Hornet (CV-8). She stopped at Noumea on 11 May and then continued on to Samoa, reaching Tutuila on 24 May. Four days later, she put to sea to return to Hawaii and entered Pearl Harbor on the 30th. On 1 July, she left Oahu to conduct nearly a month of operations with TF 18 before returning on the 26th.

Tippecanoe departed Pearl Harbor on 9 August 1942 and reached Alaskan waters on the 15th to begin three years in the frigid northern latitudes of the Pacific. For the remainder of the war, she steamed the resupply circuit between such ports as Kodiak, Dutch Harbor, Adak, Akutan, Cold Bay, and Attu and made periodic voyages south to Seattle and San Francisco to replenish. In May 1943, she supported the invasion of Attu, but from a safe distance in port at Adak. By the latter part of the summer, the Aleutians had been secured, and her travels among the American bases in the area became routine.

On 15 August 1945, when hostilities in the Pacific ceased, Tippecanoe was en route from Seattle to Dutch Harbor. After visits to Adak and Attu during the latter half of the month, the oiler headed for Japan for several months of duty supporting the occupation forces. She arrived at Ominato on 8 September and, after a month there, moved on to Tokyo. During her two remaining months in Japan, she visited Aomori, Yokohama, and Yokosuka. She departed Yokosuka on 28 November to return to the United States and entered San Francisco on 18 December. On 6 March 1946, Tippecanoe was decommissioned at Mare Island Naval Shipyard. Her disposal was authorized on 19 March, and her name was struck from the Navy List on 12 April. She was transferred to the Maritime Commission on 7 October and was sold to the National Metal & Steel Co. on 20 November 1946.
