= USS Trinity =

Oiler of the United States Navy

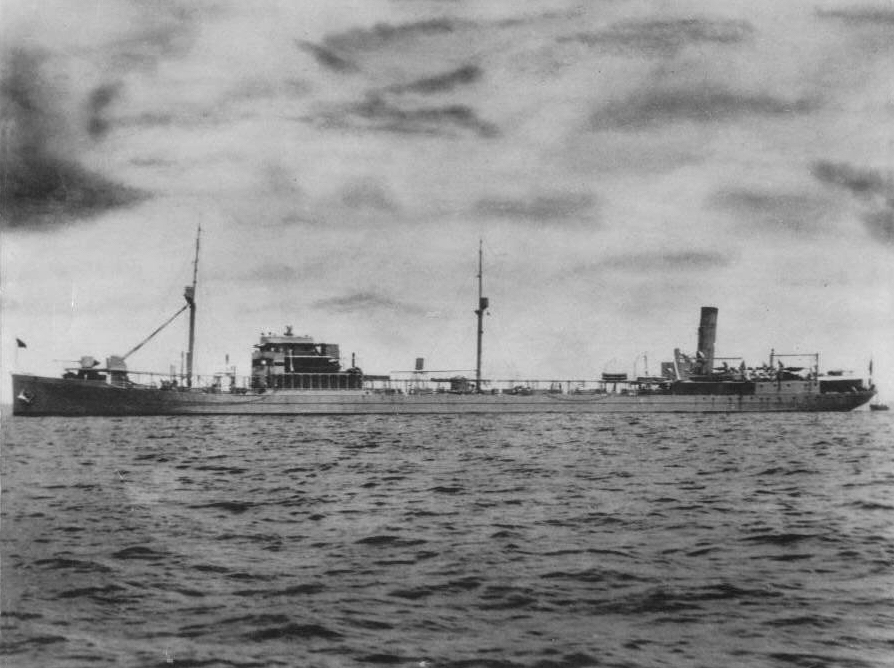
- USS Trinity (AO-13) during World War II.

History

United States
- Name: Trinity
- Namesake: Trinity River (Texas) or; Trinity River (California)
- Laid down: 10 November 1919
- Launched: 3 July 1920
- Commissioned: 4 September 1920
- Decommissioned: 2 December 1923
- Recommissioned: 21 June 1938
- Decommissioned: 28 May 1946
- Stricken: 3 July 1946
- Honors and awards: One battle star for World War II
- Fate: Sold into commercial service 1951

General characteristics
- Class & type: Patoka-class replenishment oiler
- Displacement: 16,800 long tons (17,070 t) (full)
- Length: 477 ft 10 in (145.64 m)
- Beam: 60 ft (18 m)
- Draft: Max. 29 ft (8.8 m)
- Speed: 11.2 knots (20.7 km/h; 12.9 mph)
- Capacity: 70,000 barrels
- Complement: 90
- Armament: 2 × single 5"/38 caliber guns; 4 × twin 20 mm guns

USS Trinity (AO-13) was a Patoka-class replenishment oiler of the United States Navy.

== Construction and commissioning ==
Trinity was laid down on 10 November 1919 at Newport News, Virginia by the Newport News Shipbuilding and Drydock Company; launched on 3 July 1920 and commissioned on 4 September 1920.

== Service history ==
=== Pre-World War II ===
==== 1920–1923 ====
Following shakedown, Trinity got underway from Chesapeake Bay on 11 February 1921, bound for the Mediterranean. She arrived at Valletta, Malta and delivered general stores for USS Pittsburgh (CA-4) before proceeding to Split, Yugoslavia (present-day Croatia), with fuel oil for American ships operating in the Adriatic. After a three-day layover at Split, she got underway on 8 March for Venice, where she arrived on 12 March. She eventually called at Pula (then in Italy, now in Croatia), before making port at Brindisi to take on fuel oil and general supplies for the naval base at Constantinople, Turkey, and American naval forces operating in Turkish waters. Following the delivery of this cargo, Trinity sailed to Gibraltar, then departed there on 4 April and arrived at Tompkinsville, Staten Island, New York, on 17 April. Subsequently, based at Norfolk, Virginia and assigned to the Naval Overseas Transportation Service, the oiler operated along the United States East Coast and in the Caribbean until she was decommissioned on 22 December 1923 and laid up at the Philadelphia Navy Yard.

==== 1938–1941 ====
Trinity remained there, inactive, until growing tension in both Europe and the Far East prompted the Navy to enlarge its building programs, and to recondition and recommission old ships. Accordingly, Trinity was recommissioned at Philadelphia on 21 June 1938. She transported cargoes of oil from ports on the Gulf of Mexico to Guantanamo Bay, Cuba, and the Panama Canal Zone.

Transferred to the Pacific Fleet early in 1939, Trinity carried oil to Dutch Harbor, Alaska, for use by the Coast and Geodetic Survey. In the summer, she turned her attention to the Far East and conducted voyages from ports on the United States West Coast and in the Netherlands East Indies to the Philippine Islands, delivering fuel oil to storage facilities such as those on Sangley Point, near Cavite. Late in 1940, the oiler was transferred to the Asiatic Fleet.

She departed Manila Bay on 28 February 1941 to commence the first of eight round-trip voyages in that year to ports in oil-rich Borneo and the Netherlands East Indies. As war clouds gathered on the horizon in the summer of 1941, an organization plan was drawn up which designated Trinity as part of the Manila-based Task Force 2. At the end of the eighth voyage, Trinity arrived at Manila on 3 December 1941.

=== World War II ===
==== 1941 — Escape from Manila ====
On 8 December, Trinity lay alongside the fuel docks at Sangley Point, discharging oil to the storage tanks ashore, when she received word from Admiral Thomas C. Hart that "Japan has commenced hostilities — govern yourselves accordingly."

With Japanese air attacks expected momentarily, Hart decided to send the two Navy oilers, Trinity and USS Pecos (AO-6), and seaplane tender USS Langley (AV-3) south from Manila Bay. Later that day, these three valuable auxiliaries, shepherded by USS Pope (DD-225) and USS John D. Ford (DD-228), departed in a hastily assembled convoy. Two days later, while the American ships sailed for Borneo, 80 Japanese bombers and 52 fighter planes attacked the American navy yard at Cavite, destroying it as a base for the Asiatic Fleet. Trinity had departed the area just in time.

The convoy reached Balikpapan, Borneo, on 14 December 1941. Trinity then commenced her wartime operations with the hard-pressed United States Asiatic Fleet.

==== South Pacific ====
After a one-month stay at Balikpapan fueling Allied warships, Trinity steamed first to Koepang Bay, Timor, and then to Kebola Bay, at Amor Island in the Netherlands East Indies. Standing out of Kebola Bay on 17 January 1942, Trinity set course for Australia, escorted by the destroyers USS Alden (DD-211) and USS Edsall (DD-219). The ships were in the Beagle Gulf 40 nautical miles (74 km; 46 mi) west of Darwin, Australia, on the morning of 20 January 1942 when the Imperial Japanese Navy submarine I-123 sighted Trinity heading toward Darwin. Misidentifying Trinity as a transport, I-123 fired four Type 89 torpedoes at Trinity at 12°05′30″S 130°05′36″E shortly after 0630. The sound man aboard I-123 reported hearing one torpedo hit Trinity, but in fact all four torpedoes missed, although Trinity sighted three of them and reported the attack. Alden then searched for I-123, made sound contact, and conducted a brief depth charge attack at 06:41 before losing contact on I-123 and abandoning the search. I-123 escaped unscathed.

Upon her arrival at Darwin, Trinity filled the depleted fuel bunkers of USS Holland (AS-3) and USS Otus (AS-20), the submarine tenders to the Asiatic Fleet submarine forces operating in the Malay Barrier. (The submarine tender USS Canopus (AS-9) had been left at Manila Bay to provide for the Manila-based submarines.) When she had delivered the fuel, orders came for Trinity, Otus, and Holland to accompany the destroyer tender USS Black Hawk (AD-9) and four destroyers on a voyage to the south coast of Java to establish a base there.

==== 1942 – Middle East ====
Dropping anchor at the congested port of Tjilatjap, she remained there a week before Vice Admiral William A. Glassford, Commander, United States Naval Forces, Southwest Pacific (COMSOWESPAC), dispatched her to Iran to obtain refined fuel oil to relieve the critical fuel shortage in the war zone. Departing Tjilatjap on 17 February in company with Edsall, she proceeded independently after her escort was ordered back to port and arrived at Abadan, Iran, on 9 March.

The first United States warship in local memory to have visited this part of the world, Trinity gathered valuable intelligence material on local conditions in Iraq and Iran, including observations of the port-of-entry (Abadan) for war materials slated for use by the Soviet Union. She also collected oceanographic data on the Persian Gulf. After loading her vital cargo, she headed for Fremantle on 17 March.

Java fell even before Trinity arrived at her destination. Although Allied forces had been driven out of the Malay Barrier, they gathered in Australia to begin building for the long road back. COMSOWESPAC retained Trinity for the Persian Gulf-Fremantle run, calling at such varied ports as Basra, Iraq; Bahrein, Arabia; Diego Garcia, Chagos Archipelago; Bombay, India; and Geraldton and Albany, Australia; as well as the now-familiar ports of Abadan and Fremantle. On one occasion, in November 1942, the ship encountered a typhoon in which heavy seas, whipped by 70-knot (130 km/h) winds, enveloped the ship and destroyed two motor whaleboats.

==== 1943–1944 ====
In 1943, with Papua New Guinea secured and the Buna-Gona campaign successfully resolved, Trinity moved her base to Milne Bay, New Guinea, where she arrived on 13 August 1943 and came under the control of Commander, Base Force, 7th Fleet. Attached to this command for the remainder of the year, Trinity plied the Milne Bay-Brisbane route, while also touching at Cairns and Townsville, Australia. When anchored at Milne Bay, she provided oil for miscellaneous Allied ships. She subsequently moved north to commence operations in the Buna-Cape Cretin vicinity, an area in which she remained until early March.

During the next few months, she proceeded back to Milne Bay and thence to Port Moresby before heading for Cairns and completing the round trip to Milne Bay on 24 July 1944. Operating out of the New Guinea area, she worked as shuttle tanker and harbor feeder, anchoring at such places as Manus in the Admiralties, Humboldt Bay and Hollandia on the north coast of New Guinea, and at Biak in the Schouten Islands.

==== 1945 ====
By January 1945, as the war progressed steadily towards the Japanese homeland, Trinity continued her unglamourous but vital job of plying the triangular New Guinea-Shouten Islands-Admiralty Islands route, shuttling cargoes of oil needed to keep the warships of the Fleet in operation. Arriving at Leyte, Philippines, in May 1945, she returned to waters from which she had been driven so unceremoniously in those dark days of December 1941. For the remainder of her active service, she operated in the western Pacific through the end of the war and the early months of the occupation.

=== Post-World War II ===
Trinity departed Samar on 12 January 1946, bound for home. After stops at Eniwetok and Pearl Harbor, she arrived at the Mare Island Naval Shipyard on 22 February and reported to Commandant, 12th Naval District. The oiler remained there until decommissioned on 28 May. Struck from the Navy list on 3 July, she was delivered to the Maritime Commission's War Shipping Administration on 5 September 1946. Sold to the Colonial Steamship Corporation in 1951, the tanker was renamed Seabeaver.

=== Commendations ===
Trinity received one battle star for her World War II service.
