= USS Kaweah =

Oiler of the United States Navy

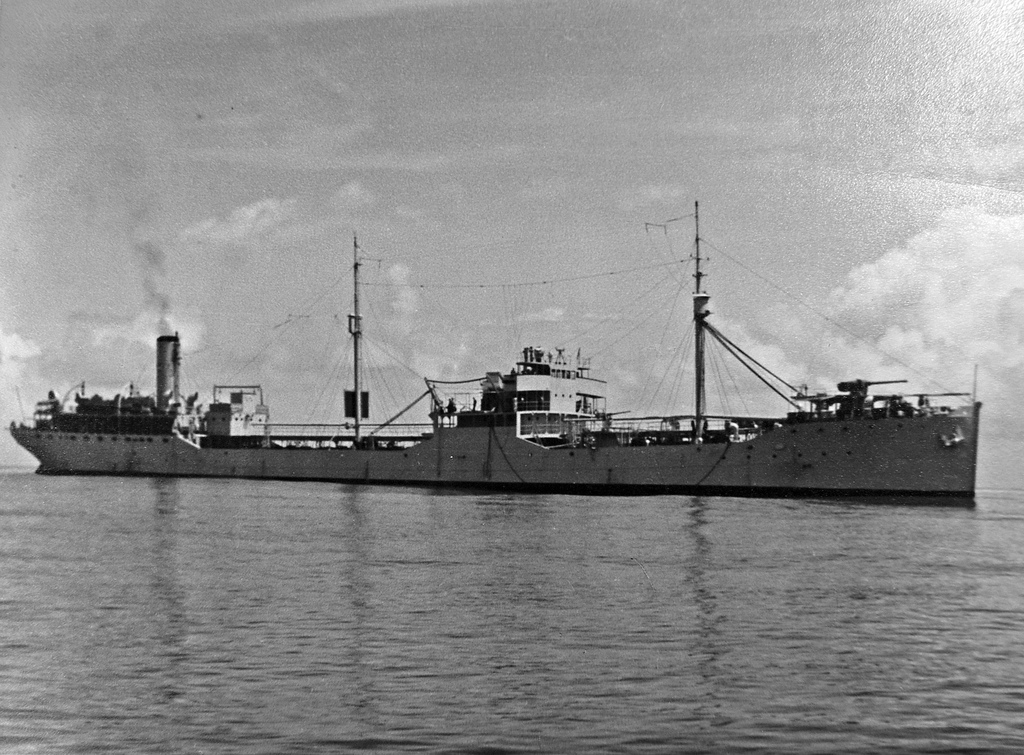
- 5" gun on bow added by CDR Charles B. McVay III.Photo by LTJG H Todd Stradford, medical officer

History

United States
- Name: USS Kaweah
- Namesake: Kaweah River in California
- Launched: 14 August 1919
- Acquired: 20 October 1921
- Commissioned: 28 December 1921; 16 December 1940
- Decommissioned: 15 August 1922; 16 November 1945
- Fate: Sold for scrap, 28 May 1946

General characteristics
- Type: Design 1128 tanker
- Displacement: 4,410 tons (light); 14,450 tons (normal)
- Length: 446 ft (136 m)
- Beam: 58 ft (18 m) (waterline)
- Draft: 25 ft 6 in (7.77 m) (mean)
- Depth: 33 ft 3 in (10.13 m)
- Installed power: 2,800 shp (2,100 kW)
- Propulsion: 1 triple-expansion steam engine, one shaft
- Speed: 11 knots (20 km/h)
- Capacity: 1,000 tons
- Complement: 252
- Armament: 2 × 5-inch (127-millimeter) guns; 2 × 3-inch (76.2-millimeter) guns; 2 × .50-caliber (12.7-millimeter) machine guns

USS Kaweah (AO-15) was the lead ship of her class of fleet replenishment oilers in the United States Navy.

Kaweah was launched in 1919 by William Cramp & Sons, Philadelphia, under USSB account; acquired by the Navy 20 October 1921; and commissioned 28 December 1921.

After sea trials Kaweah departed New Orleans early January 1922 and arrived Philadelphia 18 January. She departed 14 March for a cruise to the Canal Zone and the Gulf of Mexico. She returned to Norfolk 7 May and decommissioned 15 August 1922.

Kaweah recommissioned 16 December 1940, Commander Charles B. McVay III, USN in command. From early 1941 until late fall, she made oil runs between ports on the East Coast and the Caribbean. She arrived NS Argentia, Newfoundland, 17 November for duty in the North Atlantic. For the next 14 months she operated between Iceland, Greenland, and Boston, supplying the fleet with gasoline and diesel oil. She departed New York 13 January 1943 with a cargo of diesel oil for Casablanca, returning New York 12 March. Kaweah made another round trip cruise to Casablanca in April before resuming fueling operations at Halifax, Nova Scotia, 26 June. For the remainder of 1943 she cruised in convoy between New England and Iceland supplying the fleet units with vital fuel.

For the duration of the war the oiler cruised along the North American coast, Greenland, and the Caribbean with aviation fuel and diesel oil. Throughout the war Kaweah remained almost constantly at sea on the important, never-ending duty of keeping the fleet supplied with petroleum products. Following the cessation of hostilities 14 August 1945, Kaweah arrived Hampton Roads, Va., 26 September and decommissioned at Norfolk 16 November 1945. She was transferred to the WSA 28 May 1946 and sold to Boston Metals Co., Baltimore, for scrapping.
