= USS Salinas =

US Navy Patoka-class replenishment oiler

Coordinates: 46°56′N 37°46′W

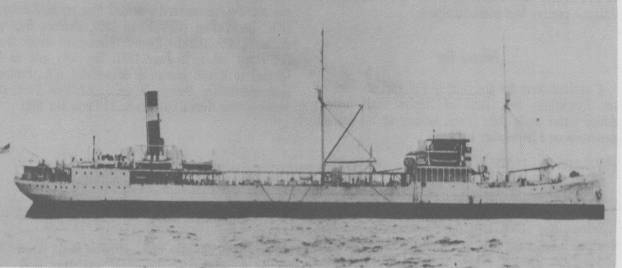
- Salinas (AO-19), one of the older generation of Navy oilers, riding light in the water with much of her dark red bottom paint showing. Unlike later ships of this type, she does not have the extensive equipment required for underway replenishment.

History

United States
- Name: Salinas
- Namesake: Salinas River
- Builder: Newport News Shipbuilding and Dry Dock Co., Newport News, Virginia
- Laid down: 10 April 1919
- Launched: 5 May 1920
- Acquired: 29 October 1921
- Commissioned: 16 December 1921
- Decommissioned: 20 June 1922
- Recommissioned: 12 June 1926
- Decommissioned: 16 January 1946
- Stricken: 26 February 1946
- Fate: Sold to a private shipping company

General characteristics
- Class & type: Patoka Replenishment oiler
- Displacement: 16,800 long tons (17,070 t)
- Length: 477 ft 10 in (145.64 m)
- Beam: 60 ft (18 m)
- Draft: 26 ft 2 in (7.98 m) (mean)
- Speed: 10.5 knots (19.4 km/h; 12.1 mph)
- Complement: 87

USS Salinas (AO-19), a United States Navy Patoka-class replenishment oiler, was laid down for the United States Shipping Board (USSB) as Hudsonian (219592) on 10 April 1919 by the Newport News Shipbuilding and Dry Dock Co., Newport News, Virginia; launched on 5 May 1920; accepted by the USSB on 13 May 1920; transferred to the Navy on 29 October 1921; renamed Salinas and designated AO-19 on 3 November 1921; and commissioned at Mobile, Ala., on 16 December 1921.

== Service history ==
Assigned to the Naval Transportation Service, Salinas was initially in commission for only a little over six months. She was decommissioned at Norfolk on 20 June 1922 and remained in reserve until recommissioned at Norfolk on 12 June 1926. The following September, she commenced carrying fuel from naval fuel depots and Caribbean and Texas oil ports to Navy bases and stations on the east and west coasts, in the Caribbean, in the Panama Canal Zone, and, in the late 1920s, to Marine Corps units in Nicaragua. Periodically interrupted for overhauls and fleet exercises; and, in 1938, for a transatlantic run to Britain, she maintained a continuous operating schedule in those areas until late in the 1930s.

Then, with tension increasing in Europe, she confined her operations to runs between Gulf coast and Caribbean oil ports and bases in Cuba and on the east coast. In September 1939, World War II broke out in Europe. Hostilities soon spread across the ocean. The United States commenced neutrality patrols and escort services in the western Atlantic, and Salinas, now armed, shifted her runs further north, and then east, to include bases in Canada and Iceland.

During August 1941, the AO served as station oiler at NS Argentia, Newfoundland. She joined a convoy for Iceland in September. She arrived at Reykjavík early in October and departed that port on 23 October, in ballast, for the mid-ocean meeting point where she rendezvoused with convoy ON 28 on 25 September. From there, the tanker moved west to return to the United States. At 0700 (GCT) on the 30th, her position was 46° 56'N, 37°46'W (about 700 miles (1,100 km) east of Newfoundland). Visibility was about 1,000 yards (1,000 m). Twelve minutes later, Salinas took a torpedo fired by U-106 commanded by Hermann Rasch, portside, at her number 9 tank. A second torpedo followed, hitting portside at tanks 2 and 3. Salinas settled to near her loaded waterline and remained there.

A submarine was sighted on the surface at 0730, close aboard on the starboard quarter. The U-boat fired three torpedoes, all misses — two ahead, one astern of the damaged oiler — then submerged. Salinas's stern gun opened fire on the disappearing U-boat, possibly hitting it. USS Du Pont (DD-152) then moved in and dropped a string of depth charges on the submarine's estimated position.

Salinas's crew, having suffered no serious injuries (one man was lightly wounded), began to clear the wreckage. Du Pont and USS Lea (DD-118) stood by. At 1150, the oiler's engineering department signaled "ready to proceed", and, at 1155, Salinas' continued westward with Lea as escort. USCGC Campbell (WPG-32) rendezvoused with the damaged oiler and her escort on 31 September. USS Cherokee (ATF-66) joined them on 2 November, but her services as a tug were not needed; on the evening of 3 November Salinas reached St. John Bay.

From Newfoundland, Salinas moved south, to Brooklyn, New York, for repairs. Yard work was completed at midnight on 1 April 1942. She left the repair yard on 2 April and departed New York for Chesapeake Bay on 5 April. She arrived at Norfolk on 10 April to take on cargo fuel and miscellaneous cargo; on 17 April she sailed north again. Routed first to Halifax, she joined convoy SC 81 there on 22 April, and continued on to Reykjavík on 23 April, arriving on 8 May. For the next 19 days, she fueled Allied ships in Icelandic anchorages. She moved west on 27 May and arrived at Boston, Massachusetts on 12 June. By July, she was back in Canadian waters to serve as station oiler at Argentia. She put into Sydney, Nova Scotia on 1 August to take on more cargo; on 5 August she headed for Greenland, where she supplied fueling services to units based at Kungnat Bay, Sondrestromfjord, and Tunugdliarfikfjord. On 24 September she returned to Nova Scotia, whence she continued on to New York.

Through 1943, Salinas continued to move petroleum products to bases in the Atlantic provinces and in Greenland. On 9 January 1944, she completed her last run from St. John's to New York, and on 12 January she headed for the Caribbean. Into March, she shuttled fuel from the Netherlands West Indies to Guantanamo Bay, Cuba; then moved south to the Panama Canal. She transited the canal on 19 March, arrived at San Pedro, Los Angeles on 2 April, and sailed for Alaska two days later.

Salinas arrived at Dutch Harbor, Unalaska, Alaska on 17 April 1944. Routed on, she anchored in Massacre Bay, Attu and discharged her first cargo in the Aleutians on 21 April. On that run, she also delivered fuel to Kuluk Bay and Dutch Harbor. Then, in May, she headed for Seattle, whence she shuttled gasoline, oil, diesel fuel, and cargo to the Aleutians until after the end of World War II.

Salinas, ordered inactivated, departed Dutch Harbor for the last time in mid-October. A week later, she arrived at San Francisco where she was decommissioned on 16 January 1946. Her name was struck from the Navy list on 26 February 1946, and she was transferred to the Maritime Commission for disposal on 1 July of the same year. It appears the Salinas was sold to the Hillcone Shipping Company. The Salinas was involved in a minor maritime accident in June 1950, when it was delivering oil to the Time Oil Company docks near the Ballard Locks. The ship ran aground in Shilshole Bay. No reported oil spill was recorded at that time, and the ship was reported taken back to San Pedro, Los Angeles for repairs to its hull plates.
