= Pike, New York =

Pike
- Town
- Location within Wyoming County and New York
- Coordinates: 42°33′23″N 78°09′11″W
- Country: United States
- State: New York
- County: Wyoming

Area
  - Total: 31.23 sq mi (80.88 km^{2})
  - Land: 31.09 sq mi (80.51 km^{2})
  - Water: 0.15 sq mi (0.38 km^{2})
- Elevation: 1,762 ft (537 m)

Population (2010)
  - Total: 1,114
  - Estimate (2016): 1,072
  - Density: 34.5/sq mi (13.32/km^{2})
- Time zone: UTC-5 (Eastern (EST))
  - Summer (DST): UTC-4 (EDT)
- FIPS code: 36-57826
- GNIS feature ID: 0979366

Pike is an incorporated town in Wyoming County, New York. The population was 1,114 at the 2010 census.

The Town of Pike is on the south border of the county. Pike is also the name of a hamlet in this town.

== History ==
The Town of Pike was founded in 1818 from a division of the Town of Nunda (now part of Livingston County, New York). In 1823, part of Pike was taken to form the new Town of Eagle. More of Pike was taken to form part of the Town of Genesee Falls in 1846.

== Geography ==
According to the United States Census Bureau, the town has a total area of 31.2 square miles (80.8 km^{2}), of which 31.1 square miles (80.5 km^{2}) is land and 0.1 square mile (0.3 km^{2}) (0.42%) is water.

The south town line is the border of Allegany County.

== Demographics ==
Historical population
Census	Pop.	Note	%±
1820	1,622		—
1830	2,792		72.1%
1840	2,176		−22.1%
1850	2,003		−8.0%
1860	1,824		−8.9%
1870	1,730		−5.2%
1880	1,797		3.9%
1890	1,443		−19.7%
1900	1,277		−11.5%
1910	1,194		−6.5%
1920	1,003		−16.0%
1930	913		−9.0%
1940	838		−8.2%
1950	885		5.6%
1960	878		−0.8%
1970	916		4.3%
1980	991		8.2%
1990	1,081		9.1%
2000	1,086		0.5%
2010	1,114		2.6%
2016 (est.)	1,072	▼	−3.8%
U.S. Decennial Census

As of the census of 2000, there were 1,086 people, 382 households, and 283 families residing in the town. The population density was 34.9 inhabitants per square mile (13.5/km^{2}). There were 444 housing units at an average density of 14.3 per square mile (5.5/km^{2}). The racial makeup of the town was 96.78% White, 0.28% Black or African American, 1.29% Native American, 0.28% Asian, 0.09% from other races, and 1.29% from two or more races. Hispanic or Latino of any race were 0.55% of the population.

There were 382 households, out of which 38.0% had children under the age of 18 living with them, 63.4% were married couples living together, 6.8% had a female householder with no husband present, and 25.7% were non-families. 19.9% of all households were made up of individuals, and 9.2% had someone living alone who was 65 years of age or older. The average household size was 2.84 and the average family size was 3.26.

In the town, the population was spread out, with 29.6% under the age of 18, 7.7% from 18 to 24, 28.3% from 25 to 44, 23.9% from 45 to 64, and 10.5% who were 65 years of age or older. The median age was 36 years. For every 100 females, there were 100.0 males. For every 100 females age 18 and over, there were 99.7 males.

The median income for a household in the town was $37,328, and the median income for a family was $41,522. Males had a median income of $30,606 versus $20,813 for females. The per capita income for the town was $14,996. About 7.0% of families and 12.6% of the population were below the poverty line, including 16.4% of those under age 18 and 4.7% of those age 65 or over.

== Communities and locations in the Town of Pike ==
- East Koy – A hamlet in the southeast corner of the town.
- Lamont – A hamlet in the northeast corner of the town on Route 39.
- Pike – A hamlet near the junction of Routes 39 and 19. Pike was an incorporated village until 2009.
- Pike Five Corners – A location on Route 39 near the western border of the town.
- Wyoming County Fairgrounds – contained within the hamlet of Pike.

== Education ==
Almost all of the town is in the Letchworth Central School District. A small piece to the southeast is in the Fillmore Central School District.

== Notable people ==
- Wellington R. Burt, industrial baron, ranked among eight wealthiest men in America in the early 1900s.
- Hiram Bond Everest, inventor and founder of Mobil Oil.
- Calvin Fairbank, abolitionist minister.
- Nelson Winch Green, author and inventor
- Luther C. Peck, former US Congressman
- Annah G. Pettee (1874–1959), politician, former state legislator in Colorado
- Greenleaf S. Van Gorder (1855 – 1933), lawyer and state senator
- Donald Van Slyke (1883–1971), renowned biochemist
