= Madison, Wisconsin =

Capital of Wisconsin, United States

Madison
- State capital city
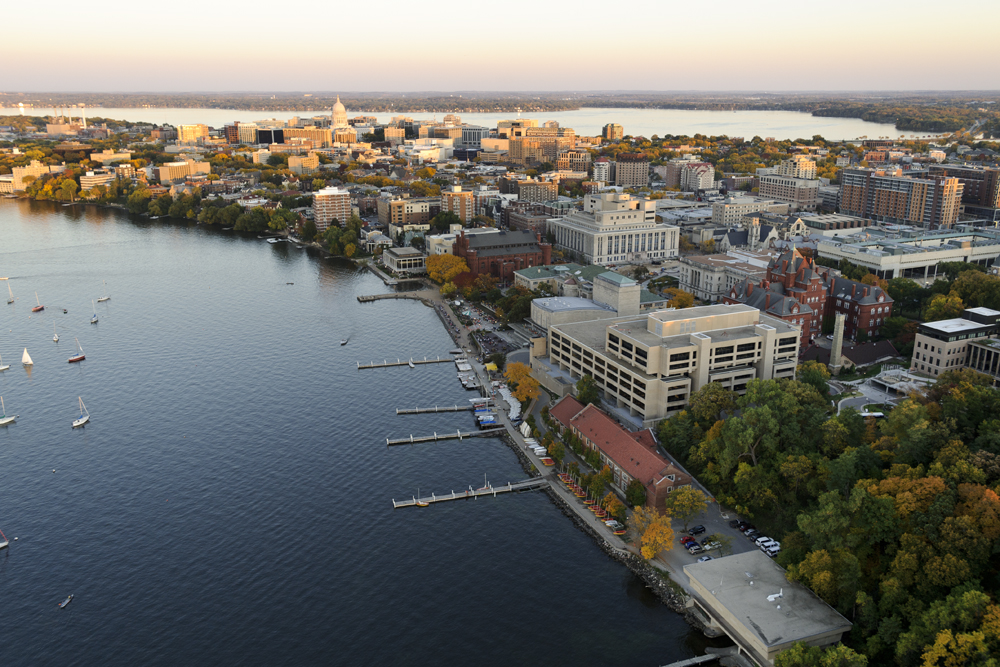
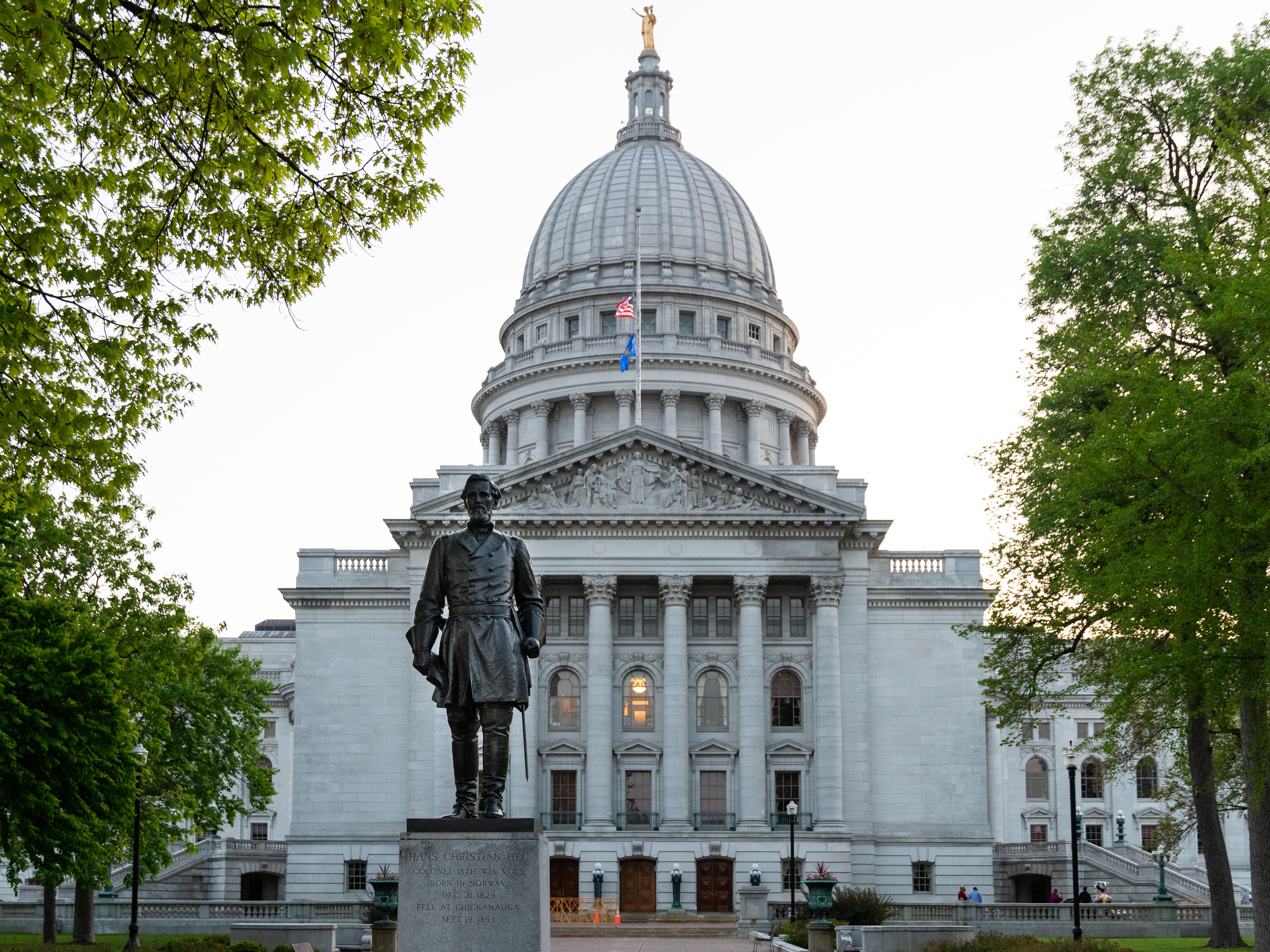
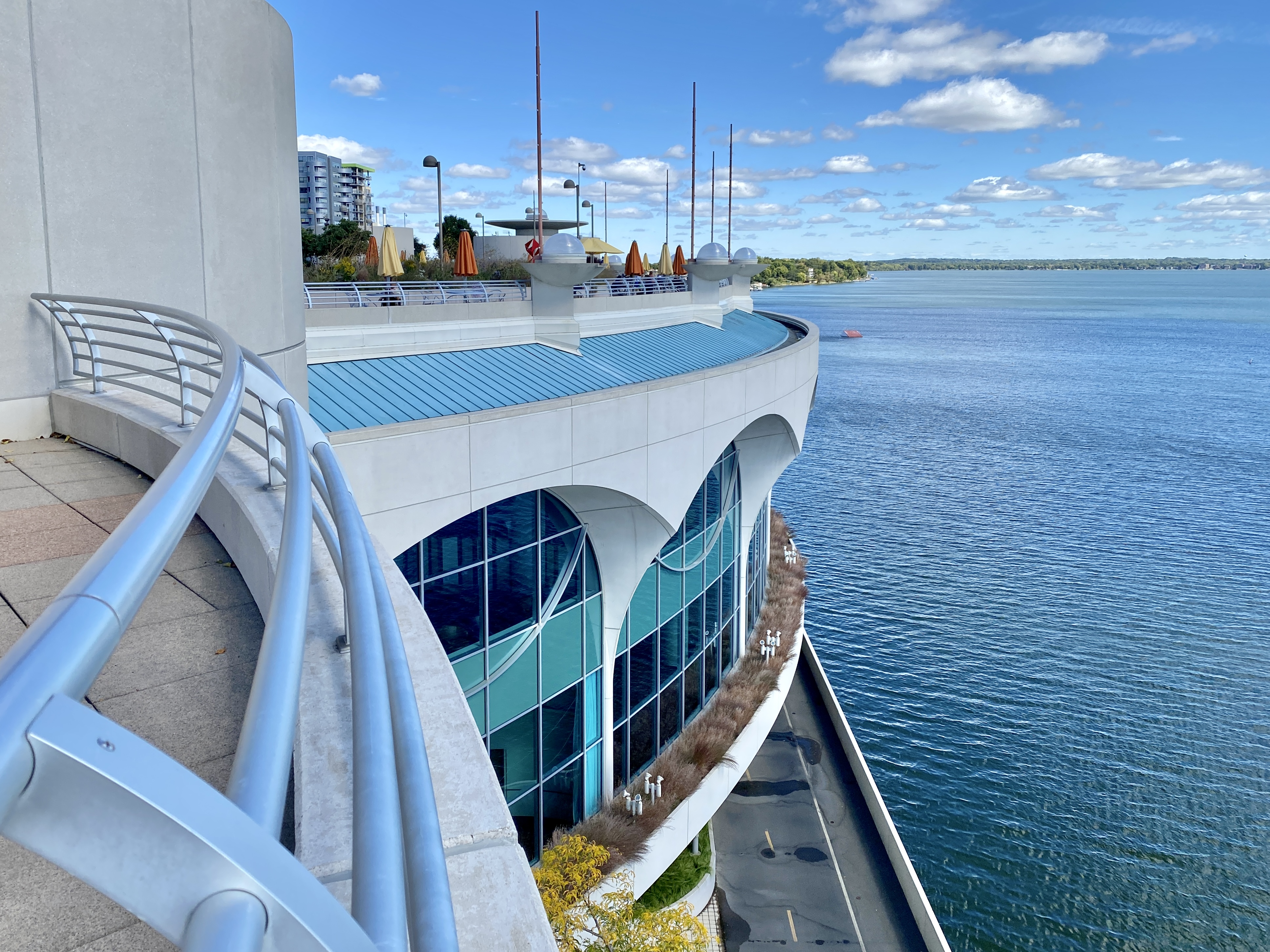
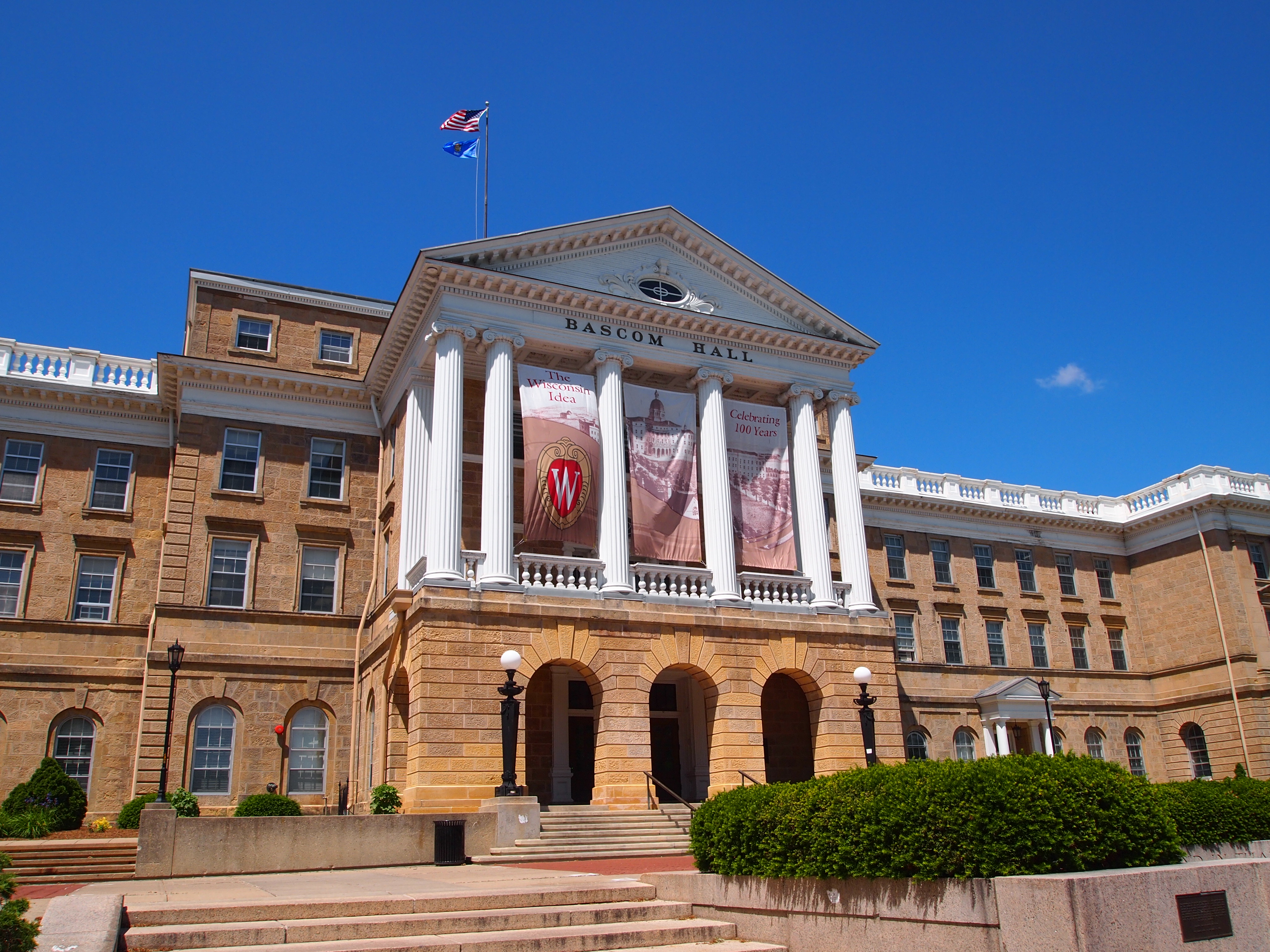
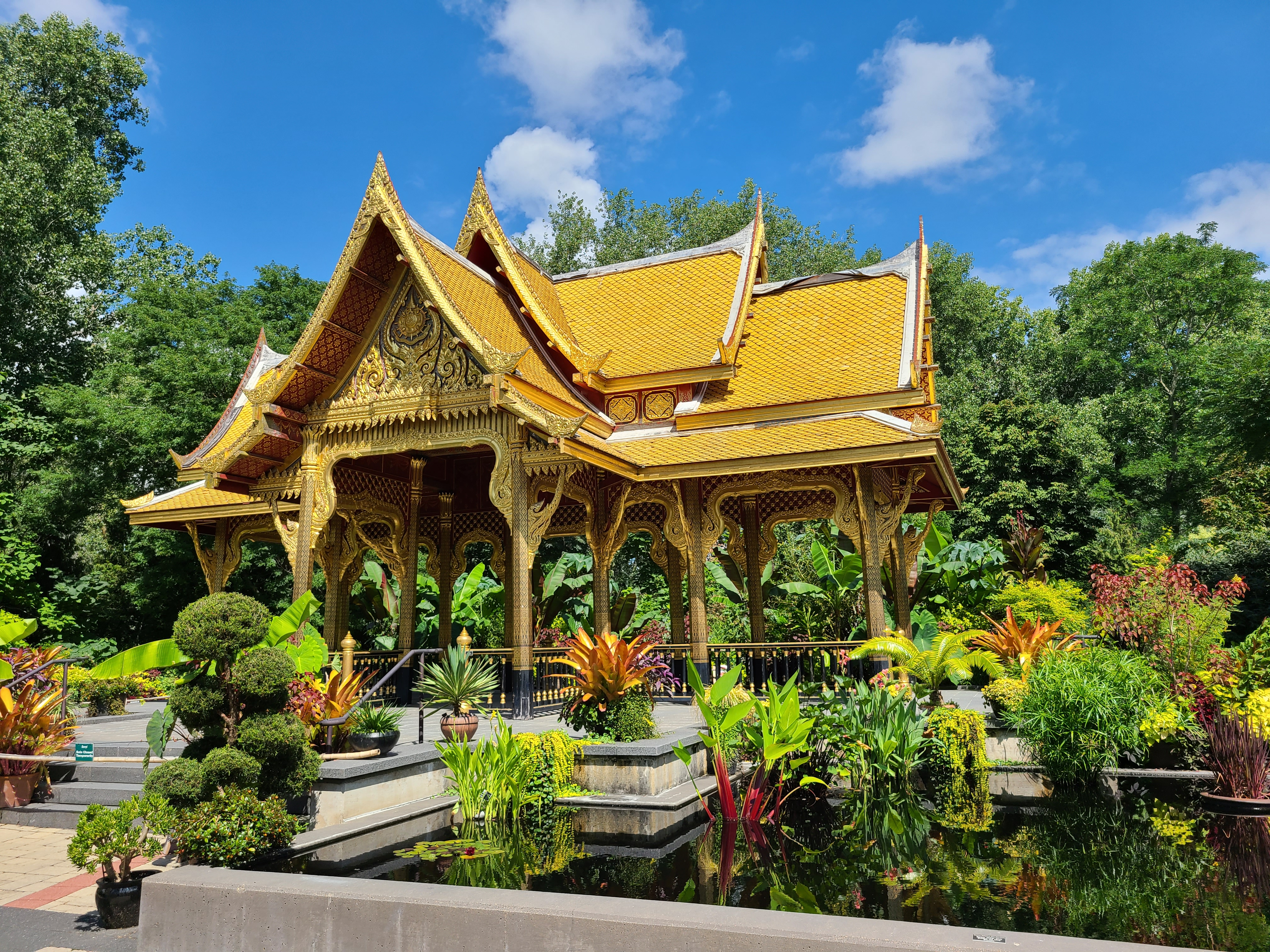
- Madison Isthmus Wisconsin State Capitol Monona Terrace University of Wisconsin–Madison Olbrich Botanical Gardens

- Flag Seal Logo
- Nicknames: Madtown, Mad City, The City of Four Lakes, 77 Square Miles Surrounded by Reality
- Interactive map of Madison
- Location within Wisconsin Location within the United States
- Coordinates: 43°04′29″N 89°23′03″W
- Country: United States
- State: Wisconsin
- County: Dane
- Founded: 1836
- Incorporated: 1846 (village); 1856 (city)
- Named for: James Madison

Government
  - Type: Mayor-council
  - Mayor: Satya Rhodes-Conway (D/PD)
  - Body: Madison Common Council

Area
  - City: 101.53 sq mi (262.96 km^{2})
  - Land: 79.57 sq mi (206.09 km^{2})
  - Water: 21.96 sq mi (56.88 km^{2})
- Elevation: 873 ft (266 m)

Population (2020)
  - City: 269,840
  - Estimate (2026): 300,153 ▲
  - Rank: US: 77th WI: 2nd
  - Density: 3,390/sq mi (1,309/km^{2})
  - Urban: 450,305 (US: 89th)
  - Urban density: 3,010/sq mi (1,161/km^{2})
  - Metro: 707,606 (US: 85th)
  - CSA: 910,246 (US: 61st)
  - Demonym: Madisonian
- Time zone: UTC−6 (Central)
  - Summer (DST): UTC−5 (CDT)
- Zip Codes: ZIP Codes: 53701–53708, 53711, 53713–53719, 53725, 53726, 53744, 53774, 53777, 53782–53786, 53788, 53790–53794
- Area code: 608, 353
- FIPS code: 55-48000
- GNIS feature ID: 1581834
- Website: cityofmadison.com

Madison is the capital of the U.S. state of Wisconsin. It is the second-most populous city in the state (after Milwaukee), with a population of 269,840 at the 2020 census (estimated at 286,233 as of 2025). The Madison metropolitan area has an estimated 709,685 residents. With a downtown centrally located on an isthmus between Lakes Mendota and Monona, the city also encompasses Lake Wingra. Founded in 1836, Madison is named after American Founding Father and President James Madison. The city is the county seat of Dane County.

As the state capital, Madison is home to government chambers, including the Wisconsin State Capitol. It is also home to the University of Wisconsin–Madison, the flagship campus of the University of Wisconsin System. Major companies in the city include American Family Insurance, Exact Sciences Corporation, and TruStage Financial Group. Tourism also plays a vital role in the local economy, generating over $1 billion in 2018. The city's cultural and recreational institutions include the Chazen Museum of Art, Henry Vilas Zoo, Olbrich Botanical Gardens, and Overture Center for the Arts.

As of 2024, Madison was the fastest-growing city in the state, and as of 2026, the State DOA estimated that the population was 300,153. The city has a longstanding reputation for progressive political activity and is regarded as Wisconsin's most politically liberal city. The presence of the University of Wisconsin–Madison and other educational institutions significantly shapes the local economy, culture, and demographics. Madison has one of the highest numbers of parks and playgrounds per capita among the 100 largest U.S. cities and has been recognized as a bicycle-friendly community. Within the city are nine National Historic Landmarks, including several buildings designed by Frank Lloyd Wright.

== History ==
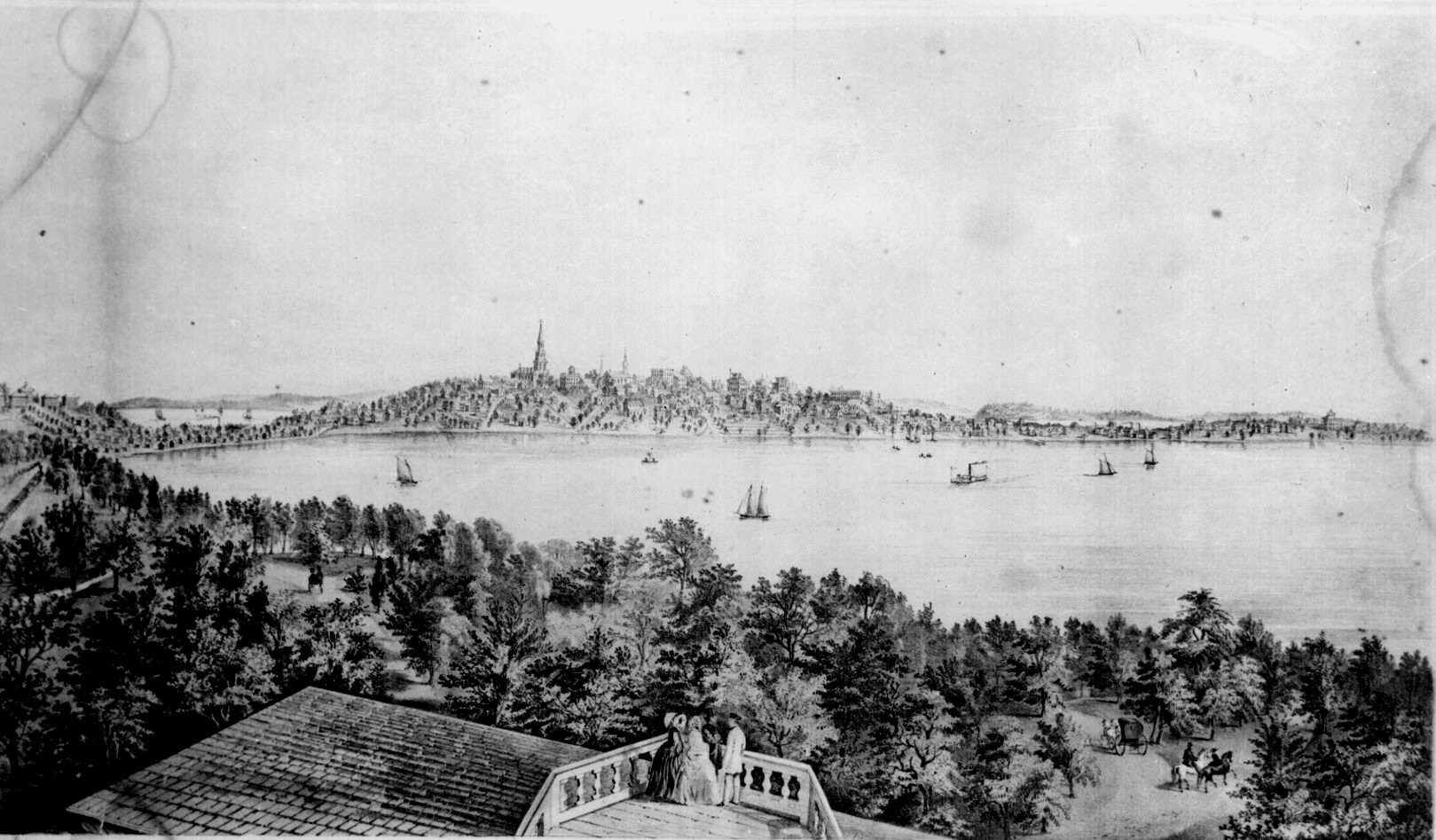
View of Madison from the Water Cure, south side of Lake Monona, 1855

=== Native Americans ===
Before Europeans, humans inhabited the area in and around Madison for about 12,000 years. The Ho-Chunk called the region Teejop (Ho-Chunk pronunciation: [teːdʒop]) meaning 'land of the four lakes' (Mendota, Monona, Waubesa, and Kegonsa). Numerous effigy mounds, constructed for ceremonial and burial purposes more than 1,000 years earlier, dotted the rich prairies around the lakes. Dugout canoes found near many small lakes and rivers are prompting new anthropological research projects.

=== Founding ===
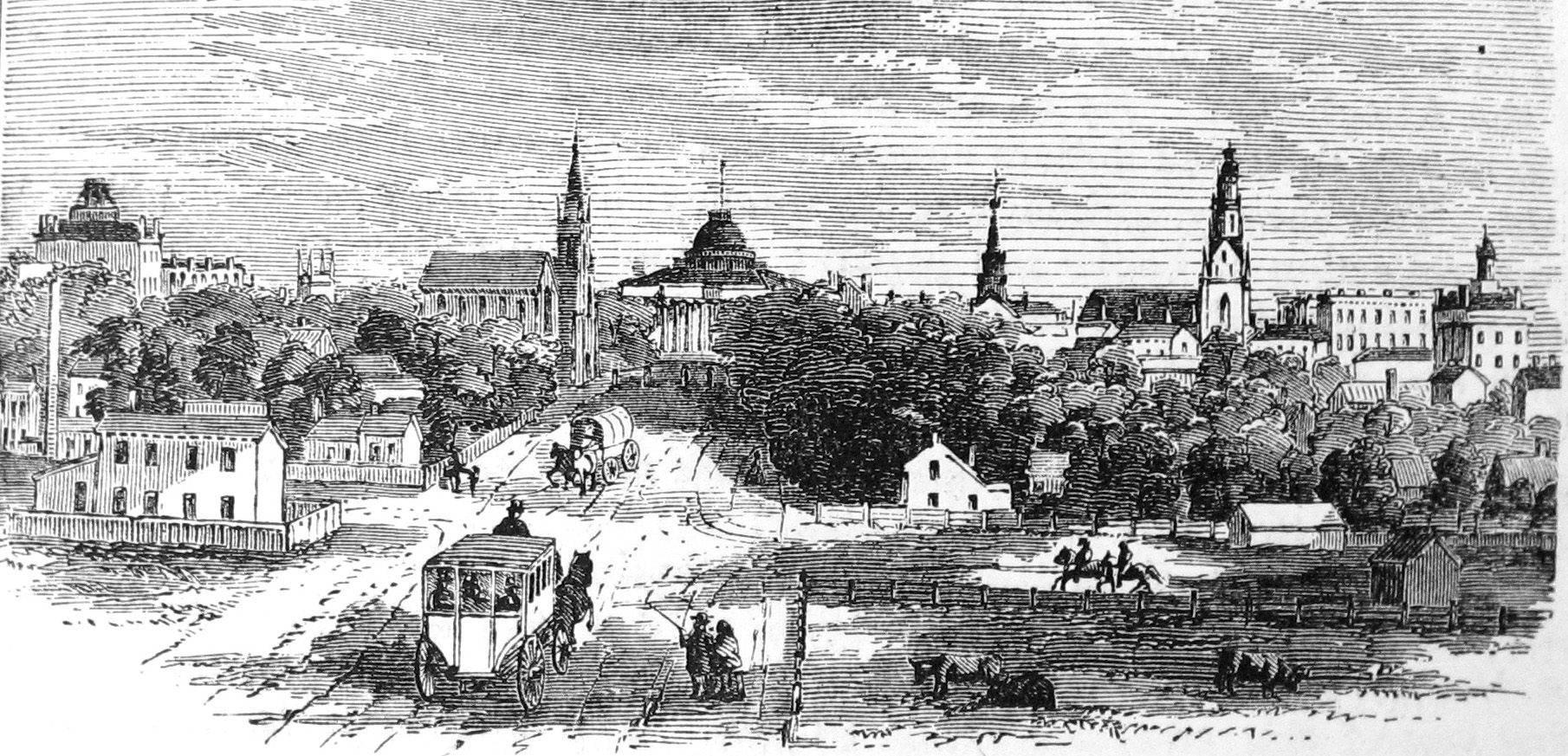
View of downtown and capitol from Washington Street, 1865

Madison's modern origins begin in 1829, when former federal judge James Duane Doty purchased 1,261 acres (4 km^{2}) of swamp and forest land on the isthmus between Lakes Mendota and Monona for $1,500, with the intention of building a city in the Four Lakes region. When the Wisconsin Territory was created in 1836 the territorial legislature convened in Belmont, Wisconsin. One of the legislature's tasks was to select a permanent location for the territory's capital. Doty lobbied aggressively for Madison as the new capital, offering buffalo robes to the freezing legislators and choice lots in Madison at discount prices to undecided voters. He had James Slaughter plat two cities in the area, Madison and "The City of Four Lakes", near present-day Middleton.

Doty named his city for James Madison, the fourth president of the U.S. who had died on June 28, 1836. He named the streets for the other 38 signers of the U.S. Constitution. Although the city existed only on paper, the territorial legislature voted on November 28, 1836, to make Madison its capital, largely because of its location halfway between the new and growing cities around Milwaukee in the east and the long-established strategic post of Prairie du Chien in the west, and between the highly populated lead mining regions in the southwest and Wisconsin's oldest city, Green Bay, in the northeast.

=== Expansion ===
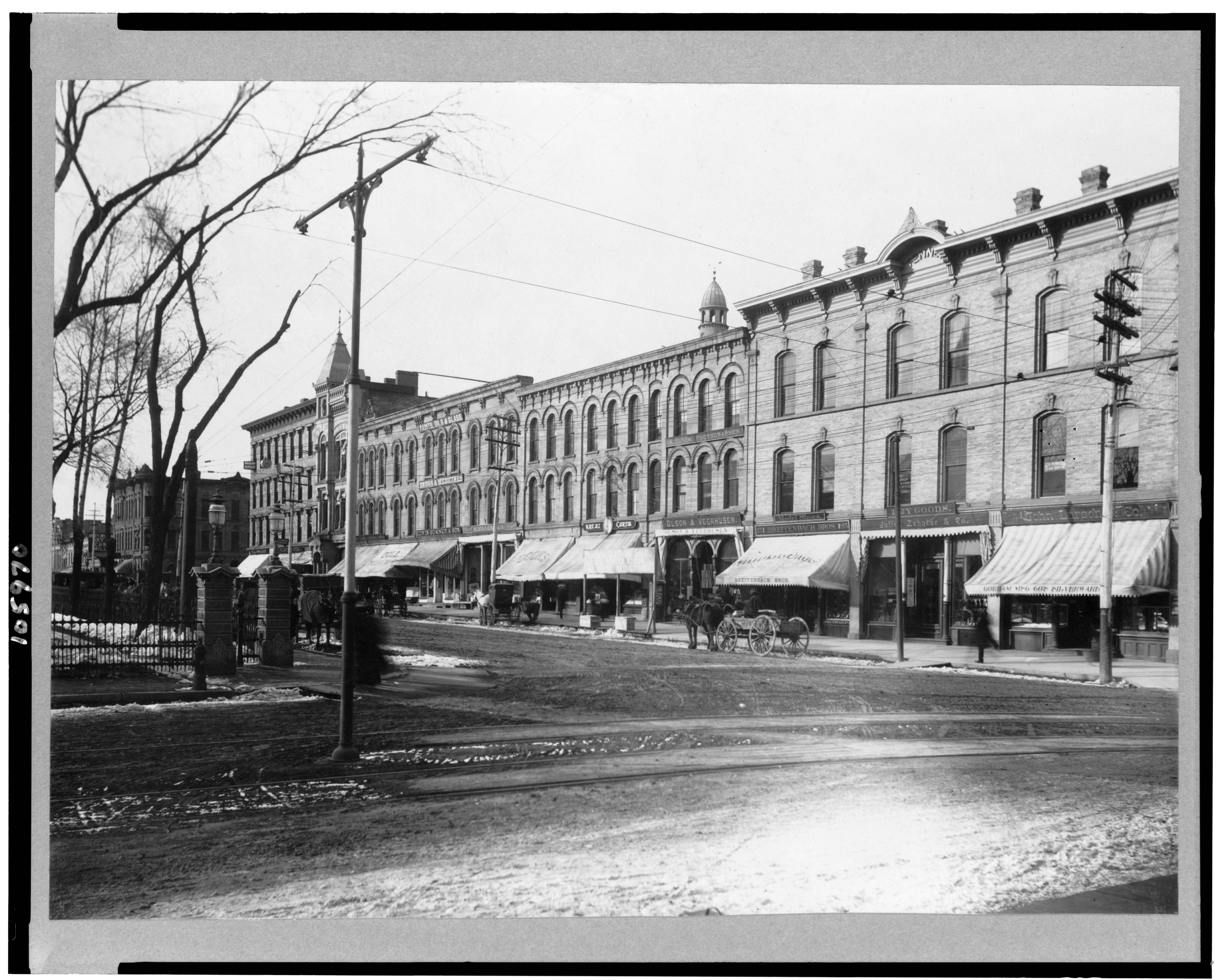
Pinckney Street, 1901

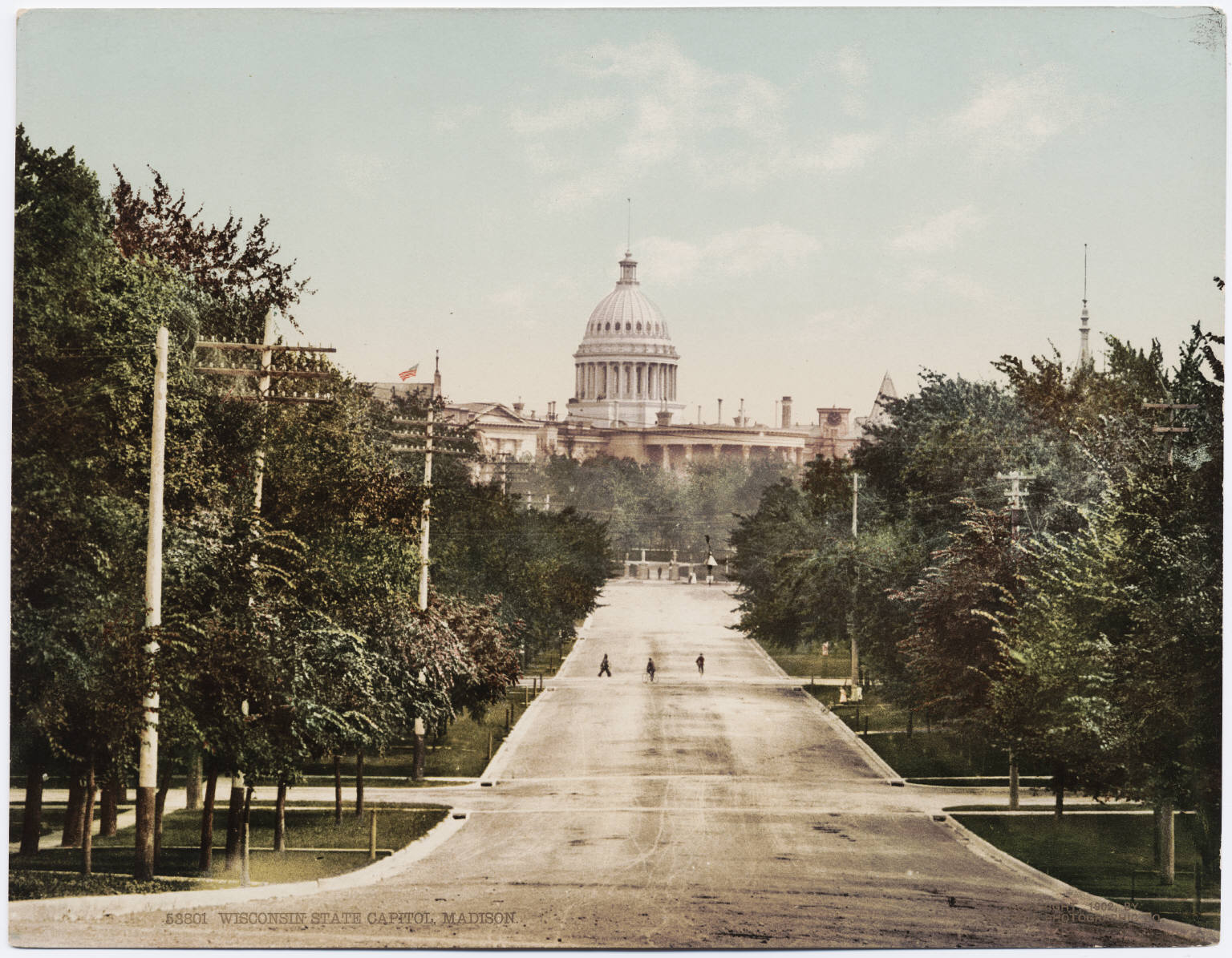
The third Wisconsin State Capitol, which burned down in 1904

The cornerstone for the first Wisconsin State Capitol was laid in 1837, and the legislature first met there in 1838. On October 9, 1839, Kintzing Prichett registered the plat of Madison at the registrar's office of the then-territorial Dane County. Madison was incorporated as a village in 1846, with a population of 626. When Wisconsin became a state in 1848, Madison remained the capital.

The Wisconsin Constitution provided for "the establishment of a state university, at or near the seat of state government..." The University of Wisconsin was created on July 26, 1848, by an act of Governor Nelson Dewey. A permanent campus site was soon selected: an area of 50 acres (20.2 ha) "bounded north by Fourth lake, east by a street to be opened at right angles with King street", [later State Street] "south by Mineral Point Road (University Avenue), and west by a carriage-way from said road to the lake." The regents' building plans called for a "main edifice fronting towards the Capitol, three stories high, surmounted by an observatory for astronomical observations." This building, University Hall, now known as Bascom Hall, was completed in 1859.

The Milwaukee & Mississippi Railroad, a predecessor of the Milwaukee Road, connected to Madison in 1854. Madison was incorporated as a city in 1856, with a population of 6,863, leaving the unincorporated remainder as a separate Town of Madison. The original capitol was replaced in 1863 and this second capitol burned in 1904. The current capitol was built between 1906 and 1917.

During the Civil War, Madison served as a center of the Union Army in Wisconsin. The intersection of Milwaukee, East Washington, Winnebago, and North Streets is known as Union Corners because a tavern there was the last stop for Union soldiers before leaving to fight the Confederates. Camp Randall, on Madison's west side, was built and used as a training camp, a military hospital, and a prison camp for captured Confederate soldiers. After the war, the Camp Randall site was absorbed into the University of Wisconsin, and Camp Randall Stadium was built there in 1917. In 2004 the last vestige of active military training on the site was removed when the stadium renovation replaced a firing range used for ROTC training.

=== 1960s and 1970s ===
In the 1960s and 1970s, the Madison counterculture centered on the neighborhood of Mifflin and Bassett streets, known as "Miffland". The area contained many three-story houses that had been turned into apartments where students and counterculture youth lived, painted murals, and operated the cooperative grocery store the Mifflin Street Co-op. Residents of the neighborhood often came into conflict with authorities, particularly during the administration of Republican mayor Bill Dyke. Students saw Dyke as a direct antagonist in efforts to protest the Vietnam War because of his efforts to suppress local protests. The annual Mifflin Street Block Party became a focal point for protest, although by the late 1970s it had become a mainstream community party.

During the late 1960s and early 1970s, thousands of students and other citizens took part in anti-Vietnam War marches and demonstrations, with more violent incidents drawing national attention to the city and UW campus. These included the 1967 student protest of Dow Chemical Company, with 74 injured; the 1969 strike to secure greater representation and rights for African-American students and faculty, which resulted in the involvement of the Wisconsin Army National Guard; and the 1970 fire that damaged the Army ROTC headquarters housed in the University of Wisconsin Armory and Gymnasium. It culminated with the Sterling Hall bombing in 1970, which was intended to destroy the university's Army Mathematics Research Center. It also caused massive destruction to other parts of the building and nearby buildings and resulted in the death of researcher Robert Fassnacht.

These protests are the subject of the 1979 documentary The War at Home. David Maraniss's 2004 book They Marched into Sunlight incorporates the 1967 Dow protests into a larger Vietnam War narrative. Tom Bates wrote the book Rads on the subject. According to Bates, Dyke's attempt to suppress the annual Mifflin Street Block Party "would take three days, require hundreds of officers on overtime pay, and engulf the student community from the nearby Southeast Dorms to Langdon Street's fraternity row. Tear gas hung like heavy fog across the Isthmus." In the fracas, student activist Paul Soglin, then a city alderman, was arrested twice and taken to jail. Soglin was later elected mayor of Madison in 1973 and served a total of 22 years as mayor.

=== 21st century ===
Madison was the site of the 2011 Wisconsin protests against Act 10, a bill proposed by Governor Scott Walker that abolished almost all collective bargaining for public worker unions. The protests at the capitol ranged from 10,000 to over 100,000 people and lasted several months. On October 31, 2022, the city annexed the majority of the remaining Town of Madison. The 2024 Abundant Life Christian School shooting occurred on the city's east side, resulting in three deaths and six injuries.

== Geography ==
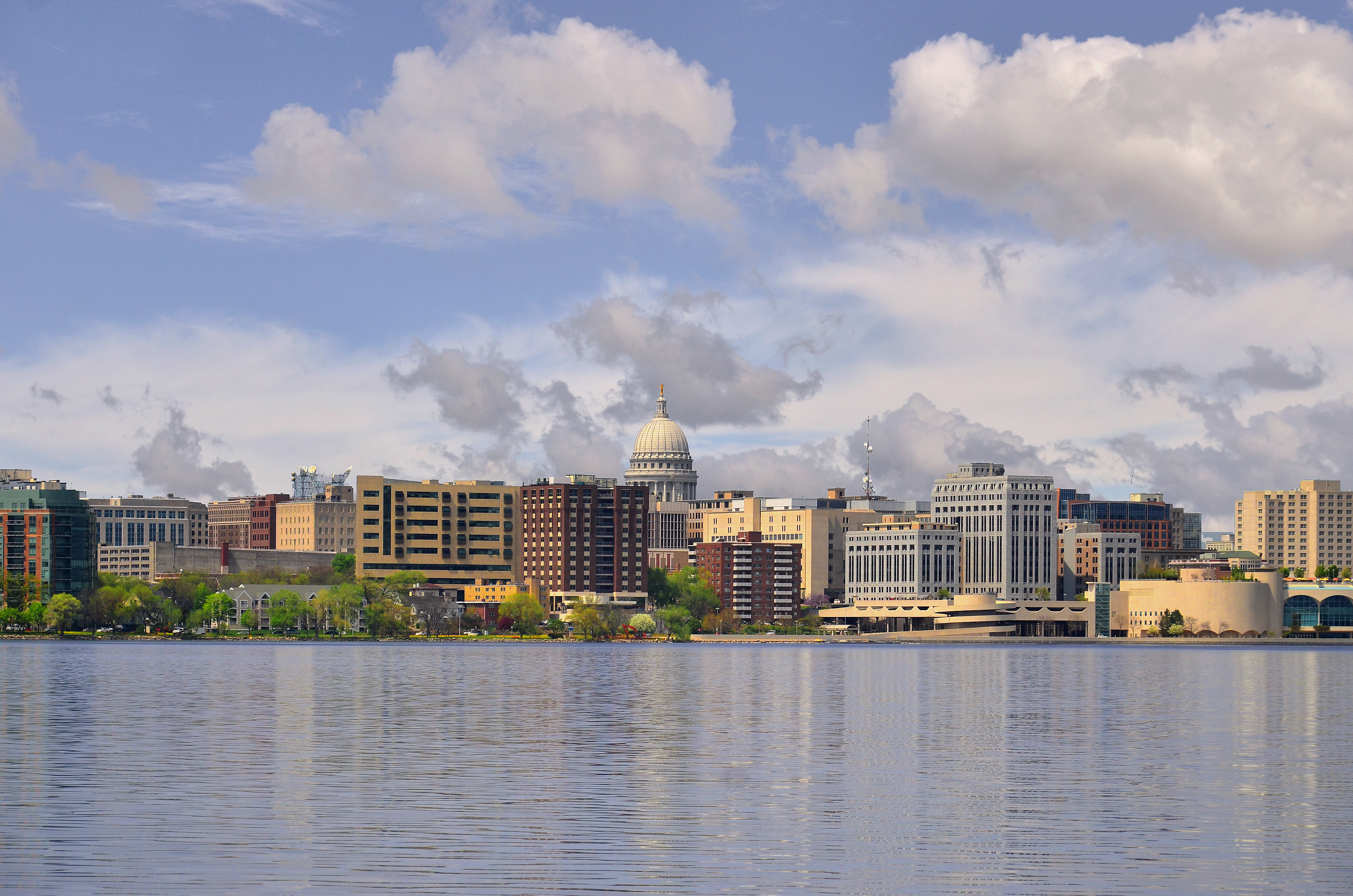
Skyline of Madison in 2015

Madison is in the center of Dane County in south-central Wisconsin, 77 miles (124 km) west of Milwaukee and 122 miles (196 km) northwest of Chicago. Downtown Madison is on an isthmus between Lake Mendota and Lake Monona; the city's trademark "Lake, City, Lake" reflects this geography. Madison completely surrounds the suburbs of Maple Bluff, Monona, and Shorewood Hills. Madison shares borders with its largest suburb, Sun Prairie, and three other suburbs, Middleton, McFarland, and Fitchburg. Other suburbs include Cottage Grove, DeForest, Verona and Waunakee as well as Mount Horeb, Oregon, Stoughton, and Cross Plains further into Dane County.

According to the United States Census Bureau, the city has an area of 94.03 square miles (243.54 km^{2}), of which 76.79 square miles (198.89 km^{2}) is land and 17.24 square miles (44.65 km^{2}) is water. The city's lowest elevation is the intersection of Regas Road and Corporate Drive on the east side, at 836.9 ft (255.1 m). The highest elevation is located along Pleasant View Road on the far west side of the city, atop a portion of a terminal moraine of the Green Bay Lobe of the Wisconsin glaciation, at 1,190 ft (360 m).

The city is sometimes described as "The City of Four Lakes", comprising the four successive lakes of the Yahara River: Lake Mendota ("Fourth Lake"), Lake Monona ("Third Lake"), Lake Waubesa ("Second Lake") and Lake Kegonsa ("First Lake"), although Waubesa and Kegonsa are not actually in Madison, but just south of it. A fifth smaller lake, Lake Wingra, is within the city as well; it is connected to the Yahara River chain by Wingra Creek. The Yahara flows into the Rock River, which flows into the Mississippi River.

=== Neighborhoods ===
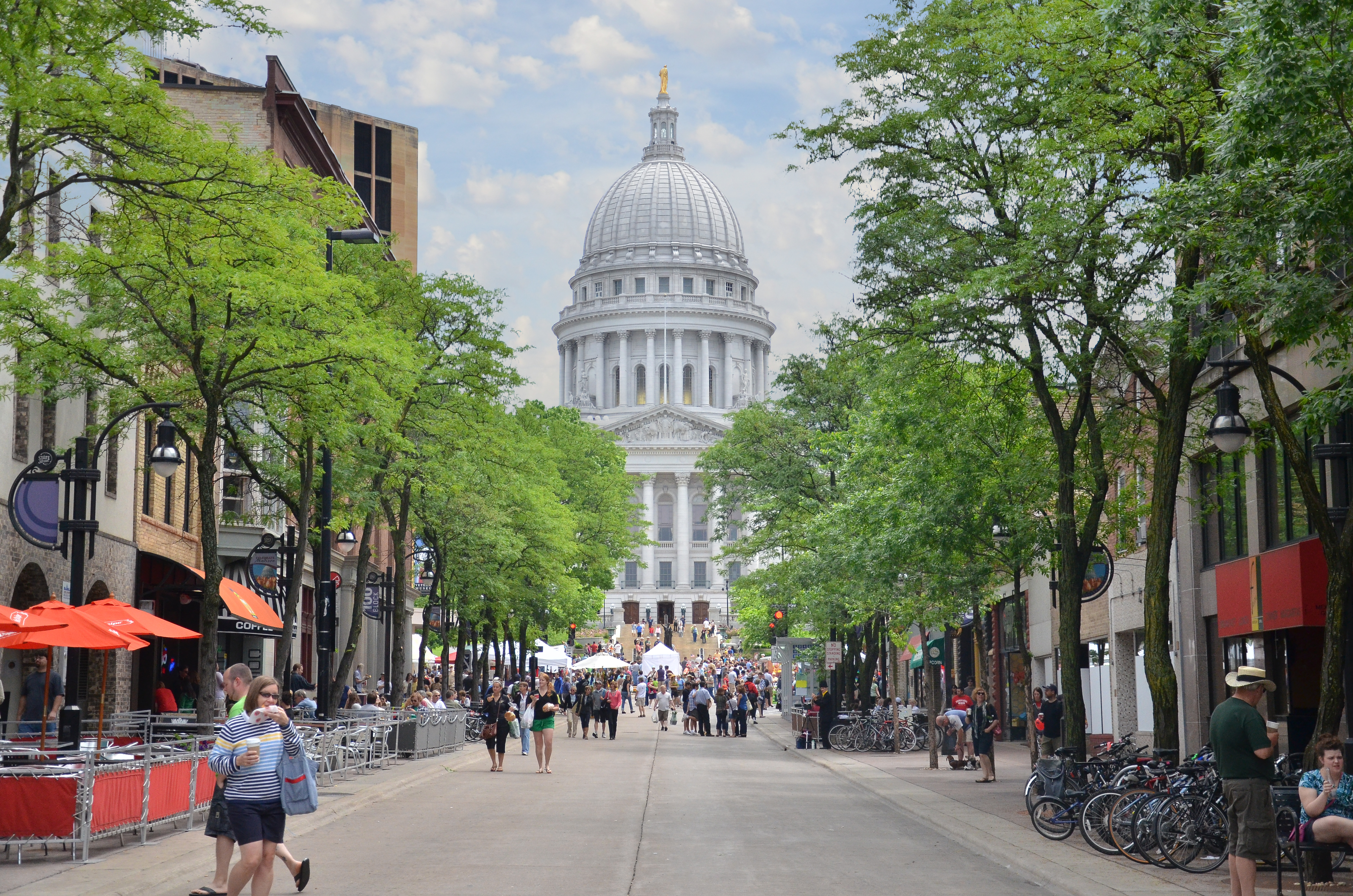
State Street connects Capitol Square to the University of Wisconsin campus.

Local identity varies throughout Madison, with over 120 officially recognized neighborhood associations. Historically, the north, east, and south sides were blue collar while the west side was white collar, and to a certain extent this remains true. Students dominate on the University of Wisconsin campus and to the east into downtown, while university faculty have been a major presence in the neighborhoods to its south and in Shorewood Hills to its west.

Capitol Square is Madison's central business district, featuring high-rise apartments, hotels, restaurants, shops, museums and the Wisconsin State Capitol. It hosts public events including the Dane County Farmers' Market, Concerts on the Square, and the Art Fair on the Square. State Street connects the University of Wisconsin campus to Capitol Square and is home to numerous bars and theaters. Langdon Street is another main road in the area, known for its fraternity and sorority houses.

The Dudgeon-Monroe neighborhood neighbors downtown Madison. It is located around Monroe Street, a commercial area which has local shops, coffee houses, dining and galleries and features Wingra Park, where people rent paddle boats and canoes at a boathouse on Lake Wingra. The Hilldale area comprises the Hill Farms-University neighborhood, Sunset Village neighborhood, and part of Shorewood Hills. The area contains Hilldale Shopping Center and a suburban setting.

The Marquette neighborhood sits on the near-east side of Madison and Williamson Street, its main thoroughfare, is known for locally owned shops and restaurants, including the Willy Street Co-op. Houses in the Marquette neighborhood are included in the Marquette Bungalows Historic District and Orton Park Historic District. The area is also the location of festivals like the Waterfront Festival, La Fete de Marquette, Orton Park Festival, and Willy Street Fair. The Williamson-Marquette area is a hub for Madison's bohemian culture, known for colorfully painted houses and murals.

Park Street, a diverse area in southern Madison, passes through several neighborhoods including Burr Oaks and Greenbush. It has been described as the "most racially and economically diverse area of Madison" and is home to ethnic restaurants and stores.

=== Climate ===
Madison, along with the rest of the state, has a humid continental climate (Köppen: Dfa), characterized by variable weather patterns and a large seasonal temperature variance: winter temperatures can be well below freezing, with moderate to occasionally heavy snowfall and temperatures reaching 0 °F or −17.8 °C on 17 mornings annually; high temperatures in summer average in the lower 80s °F (27–28 °C), reaching 90 °F (32.2 °C) on an average 12 afternoons per year, with lower humidity levels than winter but higher than spring. Summer accounts for a greater proportion of annual rainfall, but winter still sees significant precipitation.

Climate data for Madison, Wisconsin (Dane County Regional Airport), 1991–2020 normals, (Note: Mean monthly maxima and minima (i.e. the expected highest and lowest temperature readings at any point during the year or given month) calculated based on data at said location from 1991 to 2020.) extremes 1869–present (Note: Official weather records for Madison were kept at downtown from January 1869 to December 1946 and at KMSN since January 1947. For more information, see ThreadEx.)
Month	Jan	Feb	Mar	Apr	May	Jun	Jul	Aug	Sep	Oct	Nov	Dec	Year
Record high °F (°C)	58 (14)	70 (21)	83 (28)	94 (34)	101 (38)	101 (38)	107 (42)	102 (39)	99 (37)	90 (32)	77 (25)	68 (20)	107 (42)
Mean maximum °F (°C)	46.2 (7.9)	51.3 (10.7)	67.1 (19.5)	79.1 (26.2)	85.6 (29.8)	91.0 (32.8)	92.2 (33.4)	90.4 (32.4)	87.6 (30.9)	79.4 (26.3)	63.9 (17.7)	50.8 (10.4)	94.1 (34.5)
Mean daily maximum °F (°C)	27.0 (−2.8)	31.2 (−0.4)	43.6 (6.4)	56.9 (13.8)	69.0 (20.6)	78.6 (25.9)	82.1 (27.8)	79.9 (26.6)	72.9 (22.7)	59.6 (15.3)	44.8 (7.1)	32.3 (0.2)	56.5 (13.6)
Daily mean °F (°C)	19.4 (−7.0)	23.0 (−5.0)	34.4 (1.3)	46.3 (7.9)	58.1 (14.5)	68.0 (20.0)	71.9 (22.2)	69.7 (20.9)	62.0 (16.7)	49.7 (9.8)	36.7 (2.6)	25.3 (−3.7)	47.0 (8.3)
Mean daily minimum °F (°C)	11.8 (−11.2)	14.9 (−9.5)	25.1 (−3.8)	35.8 (2.1)	47.1 (8.4)	57.4 (14.1)	61.6 (16.4)	59.5 (15.3)	51.0 (10.6)	39.8 (4.3)	28.7 (−1.8)	18.2 (−7.7)	37.6 (3.1)
Mean minimum °F (°C)	−10.6 (−23.7)	−5.5 (−20.8)	4.2 (−15.4)	21.3 (−5.9)	32.1 (0.1)	43.2 (6.2)	49.9 (9.9)	48.1 (8.9)	35.8 (2.1)	25.3 (−3.7)	12.2 (−11.0)	−2.6 (−19.2)	−13.9 (−25.5)
Record low °F (°C)	−37 (−38)	−29 (−34)	−29 (−34)	0 (−18)	19 (−7)	31 (−1)	36 (2)	35 (2)	25 (−4)	12 (−11)	−14 (−26)	−28 (−33)	−37 (−38)
Average precipitation inches (mm)	1.47 (37)	1.52 (39)	2.26 (57)	3.78 (96)	4.10 (104)	5.28 (134)	4.51 (115)	4.16 (106)	3.43 (87)	2.77 (70)	2.22 (56)	1.63 (41)	37.13 (943)
Average snowfall inches (cm)	13.7 (35)	12.8 (33)	7.0 (18)	2.6 (6.6)	0.1 (0.25)	0.0 (0.0)	0.0 (0.0)	0.0 (0.0)	0.0 (0.0)	0.6 (1.5)	3.0 (7.6)	12.0 (30)	51.8 (132)
Average extreme snow depth inches (cm)	8.0 (20)	8.4 (21)	5.5 (14)	1.4 (3.6)	0.1 (0.25)	0.0 (0.0)	0.0 (0.0)	0.0 (0.0)	0.0 (0.0)	0.2 (0.51)	1.4 (3.6)	6.0 (15)	10.7 (27)
Average precipitation days (≥ 0.01 in)	10.6	9.7	10.6	12.6	12.7	11.7	10.2	9.4	9.2	10.1	9.6	10.0	126.4
Average snowy days (≥ 0.1 in)	10.1	8.6	5.3	1.9	0.1	0.0	0.0	0.0	0.0	0.5	3.2	8.2	37.9
Average relative humidity (%)	74.5	73.1	71.4	66.3	65.8	68.3	71.0	74.4	76.8	73.2	76.9	78.5	72.5
Mean monthly sunshine hours	143.0	152.3	187.3	206.7	263.1	293.1	304.9	270.2	213.8	172.5	111.4	109.5	2,427.8
Percentage possible sunshine	49	52	51	51	58	64	66	63	57	50	38	39	54
Source: NOAA (relative humidity and sun 1961–1990)

== Demographics ==
Historical population
Census	Pop.	Note	%±
1840	172		—
1850	1,525		786.6%
1860	6,611		333.5%
1870	9,176		38.8%
1880	10,324		12.5%
1890	13,426		30.0%
1900	19,164		42.7%
1910	25,531		33.2%
1920	38,378		50.3%
1930	57,899		50.9%
1940	67,447		16.5%
1950	96,056		42.4%
1960	126,706		31.9%
1970	171,809		35.6%
1980	170,616		−0.7%
1990	191,262		12.1%
2000	208,054		8.8%
2010	233,209		12.1%
2020	269,840		15.7%
2025 (est.)	286,233	▲	6.1%
U.S. Decennial Census

=== 2020 census ===
As of the 2020 United States census, the population was 269,840. Madison was the fastest-growing city in Wisconsin over the 2010s. It is the second-most populous city in the state, the 16th-most populous city in the Midwest, and 77th-most populous city in the United States.

The population density was 3,391 inhabitants per square mile (1,309.3/km^{2}). There were 126,070 housing units at an average density of 1,584 per square mile (611.6/km^{2}). Ethnically, the population was 8.7% Hispanic or Latino of any race. When grouping both Hispanic and non-Hispanic people together by race, the city was 71.0% White, 9.5% Asian, 7.4% Black or African American, 0.5% Native American, 0.1% Pacific Islander, 3.8% from other races, and 7.8% from two or more races.

Racial and ethnic composition as of the 2020 United States census
Race or Ethnicity (NH = Non-Hispanic)	Alone	Total (Note: The total for each race includes those who reported that race alone or in combination with other races. People who reported a combination of multiple races may be counted multiple times, so the sum of all percentages will exceed 100%.)
White (NH)	69.2%	73.6%
Asian (NH)	9.5%	11.0%
African American (NH)	7.2%	9.0%
Hispanic or Latino (Note: Hispanic and Latino origins are separate from race in the U.S. Census. The Census does not distinguish between Latino origins alone or in combination. This row counts Hispanics and Latinos of any race.)	—	8.7%
Native American (NH)	0.3%	1.2%
Pacific Islander (NH)	0.05%	0.10%
Other	0.4%	1.3%

The 2020 census population of the city included 548 people incarcerated in adult correctional facilities and 9,909 people in university student housing.

Madison city, Wisconsin – Racial and ethnic composition Note: the US Census treats Hispanic/Latino as an ethnic category. This table excludes Latinos from the racial categories and assigns them to a separate category. Hispanics/Latinos may be of any race.
Race / Ethnicity (NH = Non-Hispanic)	Pop 1980	Pop 1990	Pop 2000	Pop 2010	Pop 2020	% 1980	% 1990	% 2000	% 2010	% 2020
White alone (NH)	159,528	171,166	170,509	176,463	186,764	93.50%	89.49%	81.95%	75.67%	69.21%
Black or African American alone (NH)	4,576	7,948	11,987	16,507	19,557	2.68%	4.16%	5.76%	7.08%	7.25%
Native American or Alaska Native alone (NH)	425	689	648	763	710	0.25%	0.36%	0.31%	0.33%	0.26%
Asian alone (NH)	2,688	7,365	12,000	17,126	25,547	1.58%	3.85%	5.77%	7.34%	9.47%
Native Hawaiian or Pacific Islander alone (NH)	x	x	73	67	140	x	x	0.04%	0.03%	0.05%
Other race alone (NH)	1,157	217	300	374	1,158	0.68%	0.11%	0.14%	0.16%	0.43%
Mixed race or Multiracial (NH)	x	x	4,025	5,961	12,556	x	x	1.93%	2.56%	4.65%
Hispanic or Latino (any race)	2,242	3,877	8,512	15,948	23,408	1.31%	2.03%	4.09%	6.84%	8.67%
Total	170,616	191,262	208,054	233,209	269,840	100.00%	100.00%	100.00%	100.00%	100.00%

According to the American Community Survey estimates for 2016–2020, the median income for a household in the city was $67,565, and the median income for a family was $96,502. Male full-time workers had a median income of $56,618 versus $48,760 for female workers. The per capita income for the city was $39,595. About 6.0% of families and 16.4% of the population were below the poverty line, including 11.3% of those under age 18 and 6.4% of those age 65 or over. Of the population age 25 and over, 95.9% were high school graduates or higher and 58.5% had a bachelor's degree or higher.

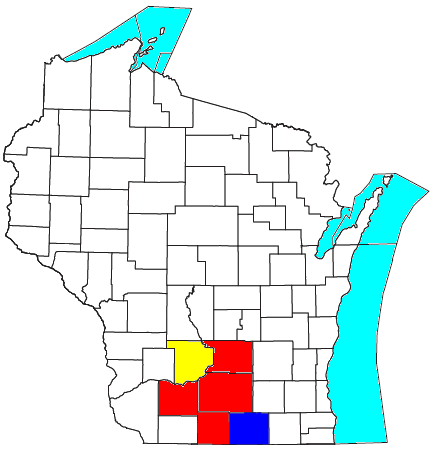
Madison-Janesville-Beloit CSA: Madison MSA Janesville-Beloit MSA Baraboo μSA

=== 2010 census ===
As of the census of 2010, there were 233,209 people, 102,516 households, and 47,824 families residing in the city. The population density was 3,037 inhabitants per square mile (1,172.6/km^{2}). There were 108,843 housing units at an average density of 1,417 per square mile (547.1/km^{2}). The racial makeup of the city was 78.9 percent white, 7.3 percent black, 0.4 percent American Indian, 7.4 percent Asian, 2.9 percent other races, and 3.1 from two or more races. Hispanic or Latino of any race were 6.8 percent of the population.

There were 102,516 households, of which 22.2% had children under the age of 18 living with them, 35.1% were married couples living together, 8.4% had a female householder with no husband present, 3.2% had a male householder with no wife present, and 53.3% were non-families. 36.2% of all households were made up of individuals, and 7.5% had someone living alone who was 65 years of age or older. The average household size was 2.17 and the average family size was 2.87.

The median age in the city was 30.9 years. 17.5 percent of residents were under the age of 18; 19.6% were between the ages of 18 and 24; 31.4% were from 25 to 44; 21.9% were from 45 to 64; and 9.6% were 65 years of age or older. The gender makeup of the city was 49.2% male and 50.8% female.

=== Hmong community ===
Per the 2022 American Community Survey five-year estimates, the Hmong population was 1,985.

=== Metropolitan area ===
The Madison metropolitan area, as defined by the United States Office of Management and Budget, is the area consisting of Columbia, Dane, Green, and Iowa counties anchored by the city of Madison. As of the 2020 census, the metro area had a population of 680,796. The Madison–Janesville–Beloit combined statistical area consists of the four counties in the Madison metro area as well as Rock County (Janesville–Beloit metropolitan area) and Sauk County (Baraboo micropolitan area). The population of this region as of the 2020 census was 910,246.

=== Religion ===
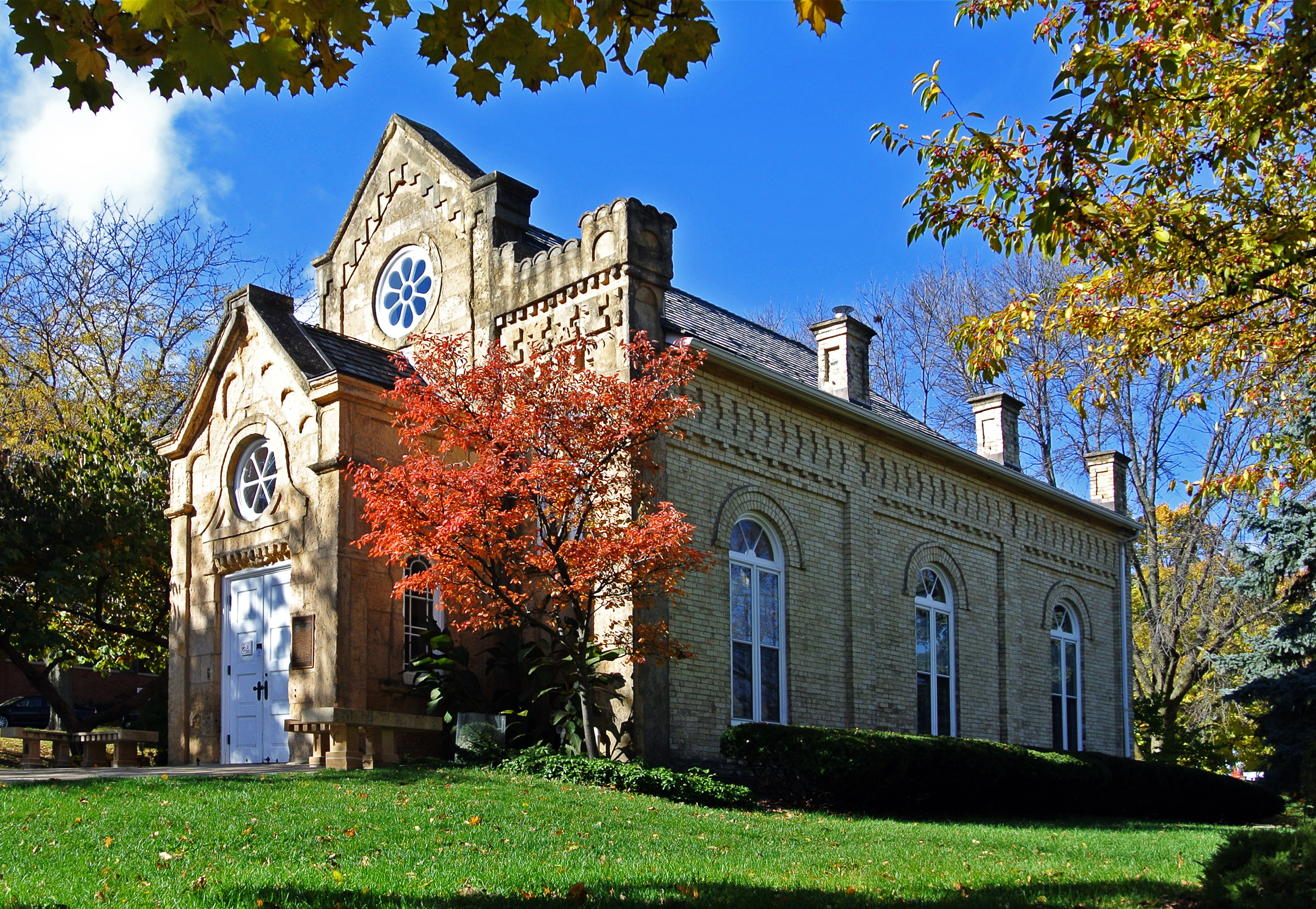
Gates of Heaven Synagogue

Madison is the episcopal see for the Roman Catholic Diocese of Madison. InterVarsity Christian Fellowship/USA has its headquarters in Madison.

The Wisconsin Evangelical Lutheran Synod has three churches in Madison: Eastside Lutheran Church, Our Redeemer Lutheran Church, and Wisconsin Lutheran Chapel. The Evangelical Lutheran Synod has fifteen churches in Madison, including Grace Lutheran Church, Holy Cross Lutheran Church, and Our Saviour's Lutheran Church.

Most American Christian movements are represented in the city, including mainline denominations, evangelical, charismatic and fully independent churches, including an LDS stake. The city also has multiple Sikh Gurdwaras, Hindu temples, three mosques and several synagogues, a community center serving the Baháʼí Faith, a Quaker Meeting House, and a Unity Church congregation. The nation's third largest congregation of Unitarian Universalists, the First Unitarian Society of Madison, makes its home in the historic Unitarian Meeting House, designed by one of its members, Frank Lloyd Wright.

The Gates of Heaven Synagogue in James Madison Park is the eighth-oldest-surviving synagogue building in the U.S., having been completed in 1863. Madison is home to the Freedom from Religion Foundation, a non-profit organization that promotes the separation of church and state.

=== Crime ===
Year	Homicides	Robbery	Burglary
1976	6	114	2292
1977	4	122	2440
1986	3	211	1988
1996	1	301	1389
1999	6	265	1356
2000	4	286	1267
2001	6	295	1358
2002	5	269	1570
2003	6	282	1611
2004	3	292	1467
2005	3	330	1462
2006	4	435	1627
2007	8	410	2059
2008	10	368	2038
2009	4	364	1523
2010	2	333	1652
2011	7	272	1446
2012	3	249	1594
2013	5	301	1360
2014	5	225	1126
2015	6	222	1208
2016	8	235	1001
2017	11	223	936
2018	5	266	1078
2019	4	243	1081
2020	10	190	1316
2021	10	158	978

There were 53 homicides reported by Madison Police from 2000 to 2009. The highest total was 10 in 2008. Police reported 28 murders from 2010 to 2015, with the highest year being 7 murders in 2011.

== Economy ==
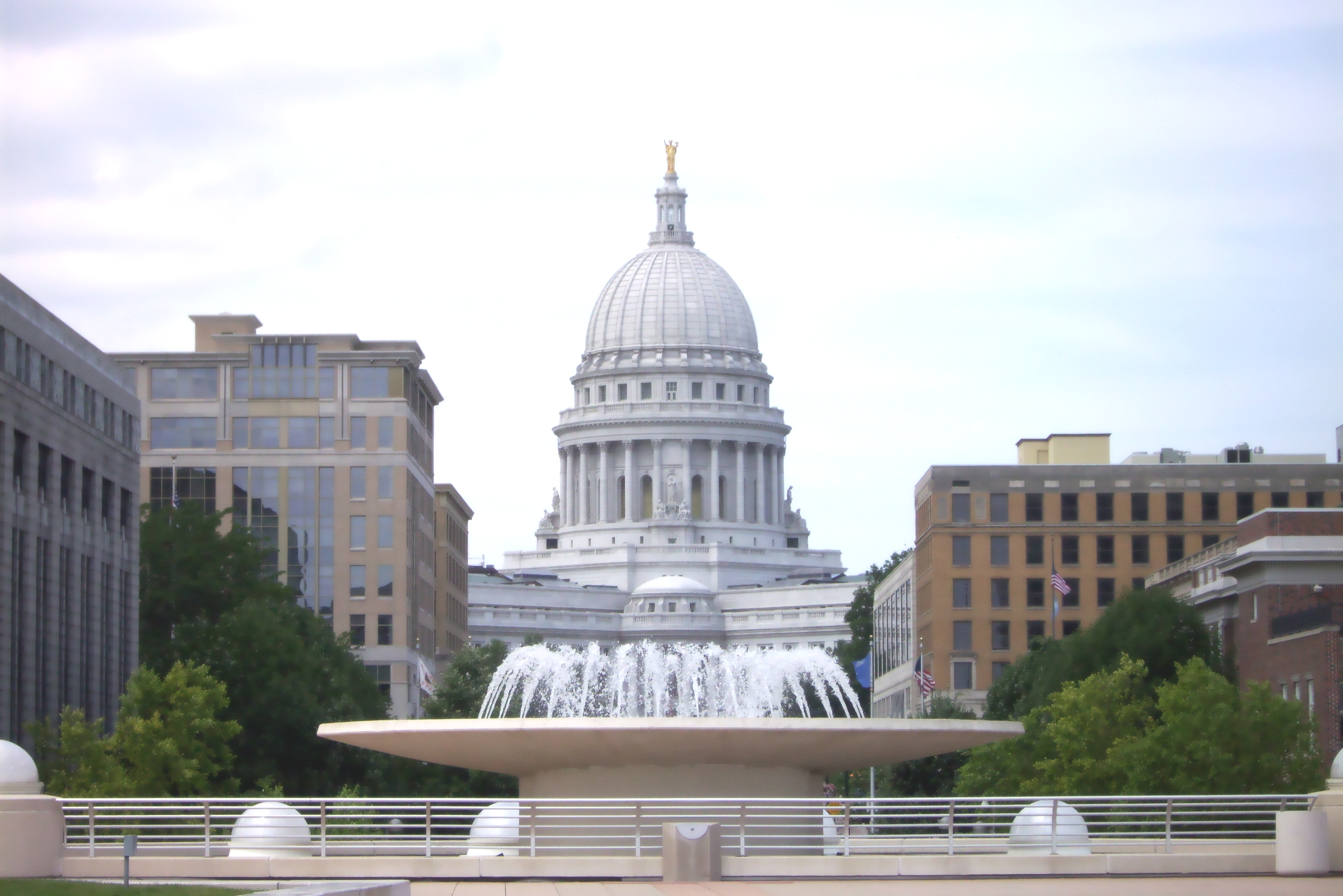
View of the Wisconsin State Capitol from Monona Terrace

Madison's economy is marked by the sectors of government, education, information technology and healthcare, and is supplemented by agribusiness, food and precision manufacturing in the greater Madison region. Many businesses are attracted to Madison's skill base, taking advantage of the area's high level of education; 62% of Madison's population over the age of 25 holds at least a bachelor's degree.

The University of Wisconsin–Madison, UW Health, and Wisconsin state government remain the largest employers in the city, while Epic Systems (based in the suburb of Verona) is the largest private sector employer. The Madison metropolitan area is home to multiple financial services companies, including the headquarters of American Family Insurance, TruStage Financial Group, and National Guardian Life, as well as one of two offices of America's Credit Unions (formerly the Credit Union National Association).

The Onion satirical newspaper, as well as the pizza chains Glass Nickel Pizza Company and Rocky Rococo, originated in Madison.

=== Government and education ===
As Madison is the state capital of Wisconsin, it is home to the primary offices of most state agencies. It also has multiple federal-level bureaus, such as the United States District Court for the Western District of Wisconsin, and government-adjacent nonprofit organizations and lobbying groups such as CatholicVote.org, the Center for Media and Democracy, Freedom From Religion Foundation, League of Wisconsin Municipalities, and MacIver Institute. Other non-governmental business and research associations and organizations are also based in Madison, including Advanced Media Workflow Association, International Dairy-Deli-Bakery Association, Society for Research on Nicotine and Tobacco, Soil Science Society of America, and Tavern League of Wisconsin.

The University of Wisconsin–Madison is a research institution that employs over 25,000 faculty and staff. It is the official state university of Wisconsin and the flagship campus of the University of Wisconsin System, which also has its main office in the city.

=== Biotechnology and health sciences ===
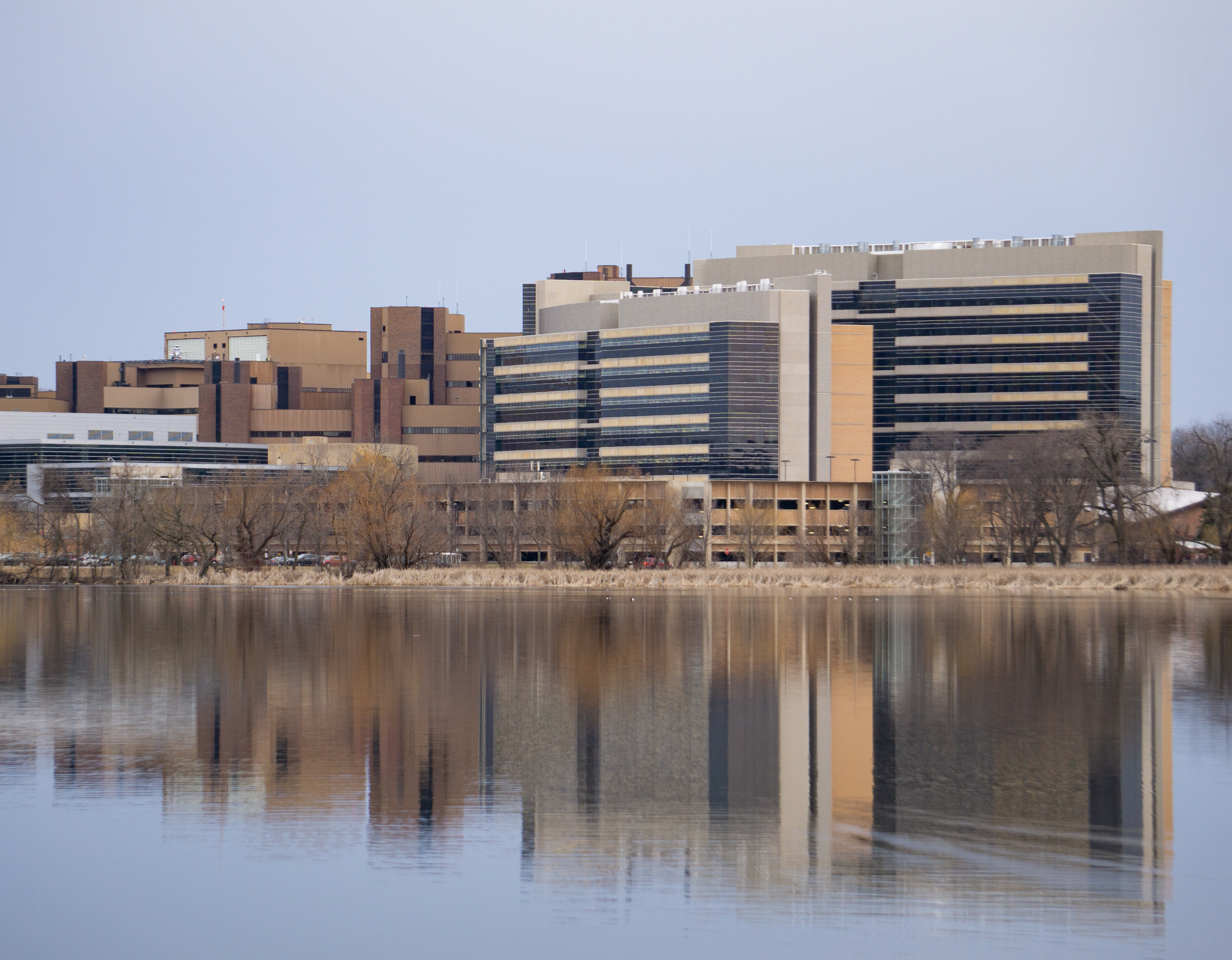
The UW Health University Hospital campus, part of the University of Wisconsin School of Medicine and Public Health, viewed from Lake Mendota

Madison is home to a large biotech and health information technology scene. Notable companies headquartered in Madison in this field include Epic Systems, Panvera (now part of Invitrogen), Exact Sciences Corporation, and Promega. Arrowhead Pharmaceuticals, Thermo Fischer Scientific, pipette manufacturer Gilson, Catalent, and Fortrea have operations in the city.

UW Health University Hospital is an important regional teaching hospital and trauma center, with strengths in transplant medicine, oncology, digestive disorders, and endocrinology. Other Madison hospitals include St. Mary's Hospital, Meriter Hospital, and the VA Medical Center.

Information technology companies in Madison include Broadjam, Zendesk, Full Compass Systems, Raven Software, EatStreet, and TDS Telecom. Madison's community hackerspaces/makerspaces are Sector67, which serves inventors and entrepreneurs, and The Bodgery, which serves hobbyists, artists, and tinkerers. Start-up incubators and connectors include StartingBlock, gener8tor and the University Research Park. Epic Systems was based in Madison from 1979 to 2005, when it moved to a larger campus in the nearby Madison suburb of Verona. Other firms include Nordic, Forward Health, and Forte Research Systems.

=== Manufacturing and agriculture ===
The Madison metropolitan area is home to the headquarters or manufacturing of three notable bicycle brands: Trek, Mongoose, and Pacific Cycle. The area is home to the luxury appliance companies Sub-Zero & Wolf Appliance and Spectrum Brands (formerly Rayovac). Other advanced manufacturing and consumer goods companies headquartered in the area include American Girl, Lands' End, Shopbop, and Colony Brands.

Supported by naturally fertile soil, Madison's infrastructure supports food production, processing, and distribution. Major employers include Hormel Foods, Del Monte, and Frito-Lay. The meat producer Oscar Mayer was a Madison fixture for decades, and was a family business for many years before being sold to Kraft Foods. Its Madison headquarters and manufacturing facility were shuttered in 2017.

== Arts and culture ==
=== Attractions and museums ===
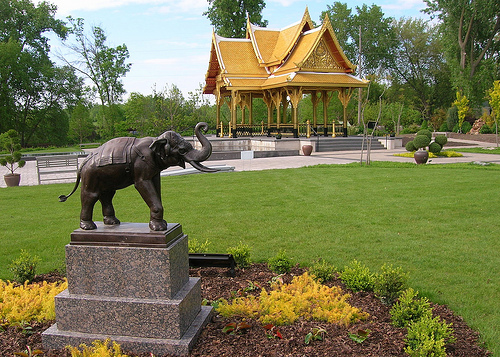
Thai sala at the Olbrich Botanical Gardens

The Memorial Union is a central gathering place on Lake Mendota. Memorial Union Terrace is home to uniquely designed "terrace chairs" with a sunburst design that have become a symbol of the city. The Memorial Union hosts concerts, plays, and comedy and is home to multiple restaurants and ice cream shops serving both the University of Wisconsin–Madison campus and the greater city.

Henry Vilas Zoo is a 28-acre (11 ha) public zoo owned by Dane County which receives over 750,000 visitors annually. It is one of ten remaining free zoos in North America.

Olbrich Botanical Gardens contains a 16-acre outdoor botanical garden and 10,000-square-foot conservatory. Founded in 1952 and named for its founder, Michael Olbrich, the gardens are owned and operated jointly by the City of Madison Parks and the non-profit Olbrich Botanical Society. Noteworthy is the Thai sala, a gift to the University of Wisconsin–Madison from the Thai Chapter of the Wisconsin Alumni Association and the government of Thailand through its king, Bhumibol Adulyadej. Next to Olbrich is the Garver Feed Mill, a former industrial mill that is now home to various restaurants, an event space, artisan markets, and an assortment of festivals.

Art museums include the University of Wisconsin–Madison's Chazen Museum of Art and the Madison Museum of Contemporary Art, which annually organizes the Art Fair on the Square. Madison also has independent art studios, galleries, and arts organizations, with events such as Art Fair Off the Square. Other museums include Wisconsin Historical Museum (run by the Wisconsin Historical Society), the Wisconsin Veterans Museum, the LR Ingersoll Physics Museum, and the Madison Children's Museum.

=== Architecture ===
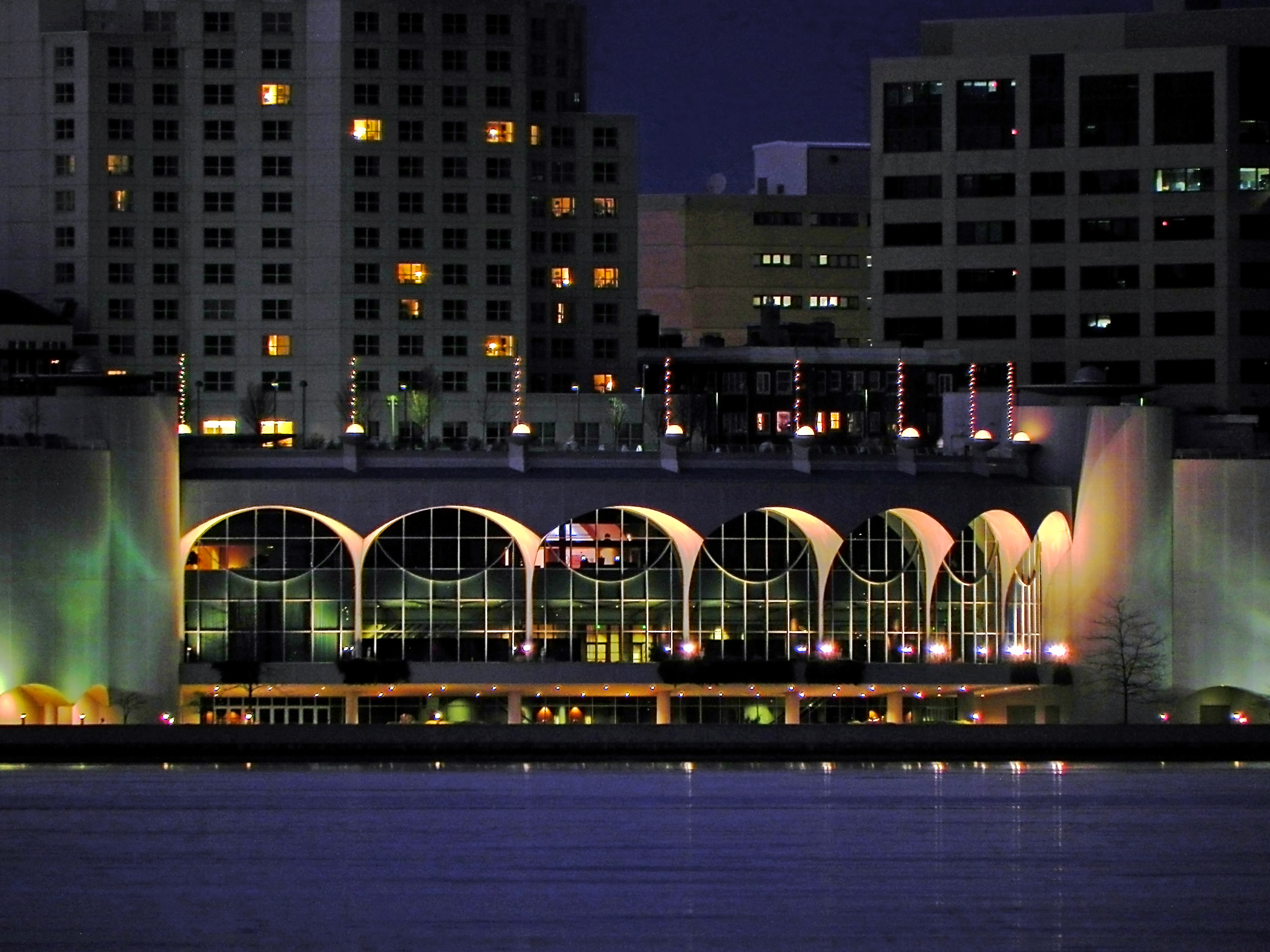
Monona Terrace convention center as seen from Lake Monona

Madison's architectural landmarks reflect a wide range of styles, ranging from the first Usonian house designed by modern architect Frank Lloyd Wright to imposing brutalist buildings on the campus of UW–Madison and art deco towers interspersed through the downtown. Some of the most prominent buildings on the skyline include the Beaux-Arts Wisconsin State Capitol, the Renaissance Revival University of Wisconsin Memorial Union, the Wright-designed Monona Terrace, and the postmodern Overture Center for the Arts designed by César Pelli.

The height of Madison's skyline is limited by a state law that restricts building heights in the downtown area. All buildings within one mile (1.6 km) of the Wisconsin State Capitol have to be less than 1,032.8 feet (314.8 m) above sea level to preserve the view of the building from most areas of the city. The State Capitol dome was modeled after the dome of the United States Capitol and was erected on the high point of the isthmus. Capitol Square is located in Madison's urban core.

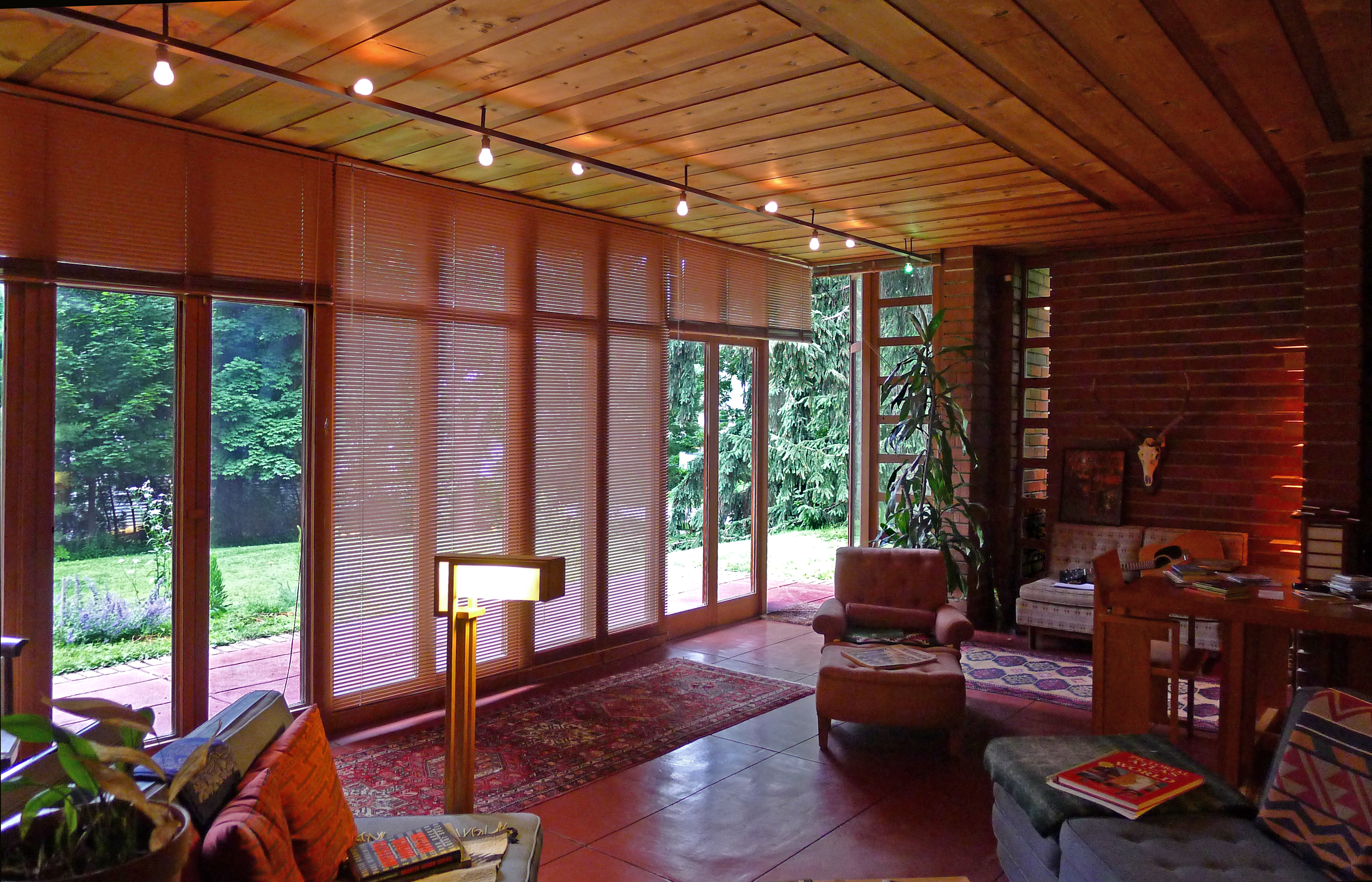
The Jacobs First House is a UNESCO World Heritage Site

Madison is home to eight buildings by renowned Wisconsin-born architect Frank Lloyd Wright, more than any city outside the Chicago area. Wright, who spent much of his childhood in Madison and briefly attended the University of Wisconsin–Madison, worked from his Taliesin studio in nearby Spring Green. Notable designs in Madison include Monona Terrace, the city's lakefront convention center, and Wright's first Usonian house, the Herbert and Katherine Jacobs First House, which is a UNESCO World Heritage Site.

Other prominent prairie style and Usonian architects, including Louis Sullivan and Claude and Starck, also have notable works in the city. The Harold C. Bradley House, located in University Heights, was a 1908–1910 collaboration between Sullivan and George Grant Elmslie. Claude and Starck designed over 175 buildings in Madison, many still standing, such as Breese Stevens Field, Doty School (now condos), and many private residences.

Downtown Madison features numerous examples of art deco and art moderne styles. Notable examples include Quisling Terrace, with its rounded corners and terracing, and Tenney Plaza, distinguished by lake views, marble and brass lobby details, and vertical lines, marking the city's first steel-frame high-rise. The art deco State Office Building, the tallest office building in Madison, was built in 1931 and is listed on the National Register of Historic Places. The Orpheum Theater, also on the National Register, is located a block from the state capitol on State Street and is recognized as the city's best-surviving movie palace. The UW–Madison campus has numerous buildings in the brutalist style, including the George L. Mosse Humanities Building designed by Harry Weese and the Chazen Museum of Art.

=== Cuisine ===
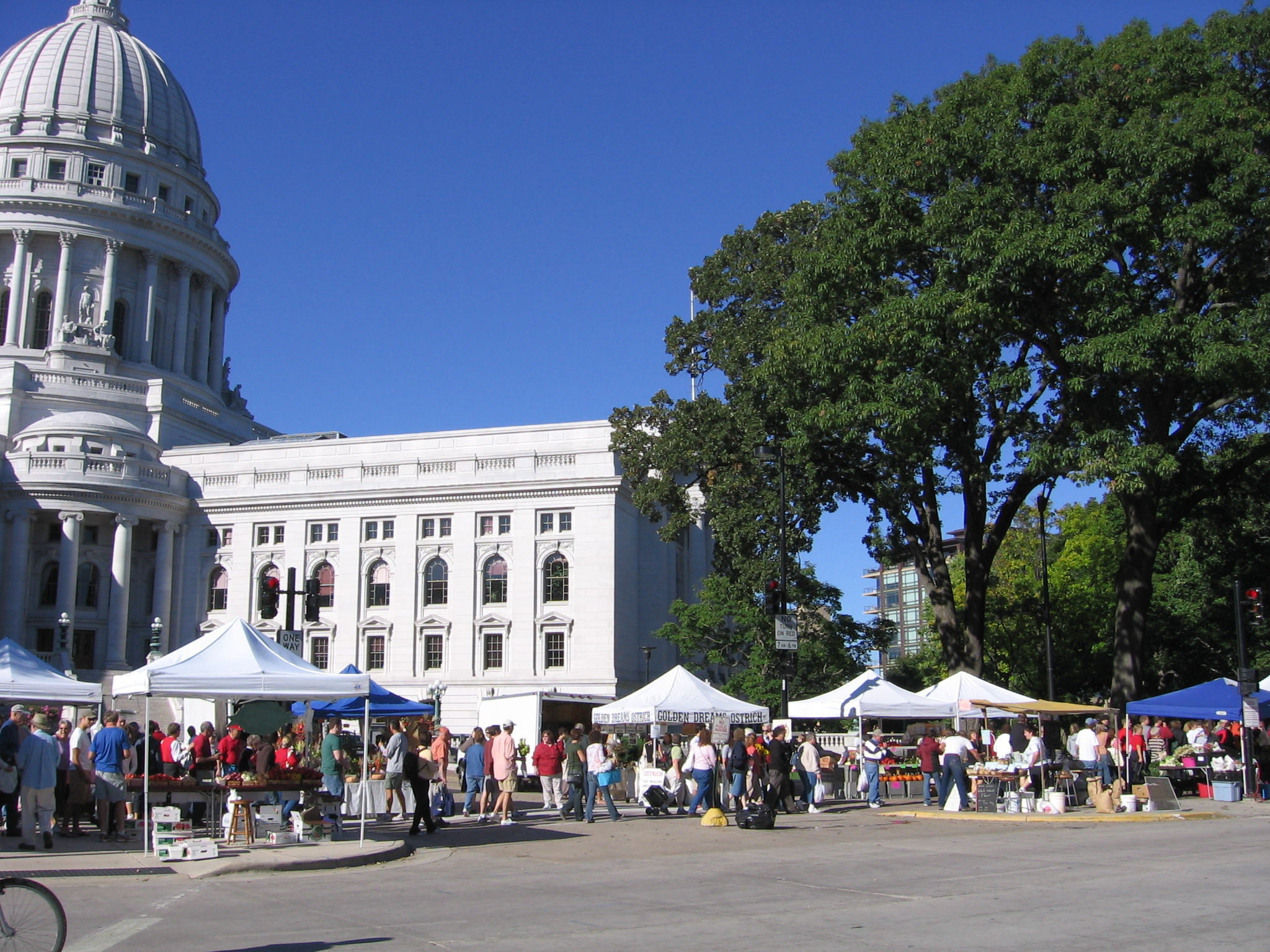
The weekly Dane County Farmers' Market is the largest producers-only farmers' market in the U.S.

Madison's cuisine is deeply influenced by its agricultural surroundings and ethnic history. The city's proximity to numerous dairy farms has made dairy a central element of its food culture, with notable cheesemakers like Uplands Cheese Company, Hooks Cheese Company, and Landmark Creamery contributing to local offerings. Popular dishes include cheese curds, often served fried or "squeaky," and hot and spicy cheese bread, made by some Madison bakeries and available at farmer's markets around the city. Morning Buns, a variety of sticky bun made with croissant dough, were invented in Madison at the former Ovens of Brittany restaurant by chef Odessa Piper.

Additionally, Madison's culinary scene is enriched by local produce, including cranberries, snap beans, and potatoes. On Saturday mornings in the summer, the Dane County Farmers' Market is held around Capitol Square, the largest producer-only farmers' market in the United States. The city is home to several James Beard Award winners, farm-to-table restaurants and gastropubs.

Madison is home to numerous Wisconsin-style supper clubs. An all-you-can-eat Friday night fish fry is particularly common at Wisconsin supper clubs, as are old fashioned cocktails. Some restaurants in Madison follow the general Wisconsin supper club practice of restaurants serving "Friday fish fry, Saturday prime rib special, Sunday chicken dinner special."

Madison's food culture also embraces its ethnic diversity. German immigrants introduced rich culinary traditions, influencing local restaurants and beer halls. Madison is also home to a large Hmong population, leading to a variety of Laotian and Hmong restaurants that make the city a "national hub of Hmong cuisine". The city offers unique foods such as the large spring rolls sold from the food carts on Capital Square and State Street, particularly in warmer months.

Madison is home to the food festivals, such as Brat Fest. The Great Taste of the Midwest craft beer festival, established in 1987 and the second-longest-running such event in North America, is held the second Saturday in August. The highly coveted tickets sell out within an hour of going on sale in May.

=== Music ===
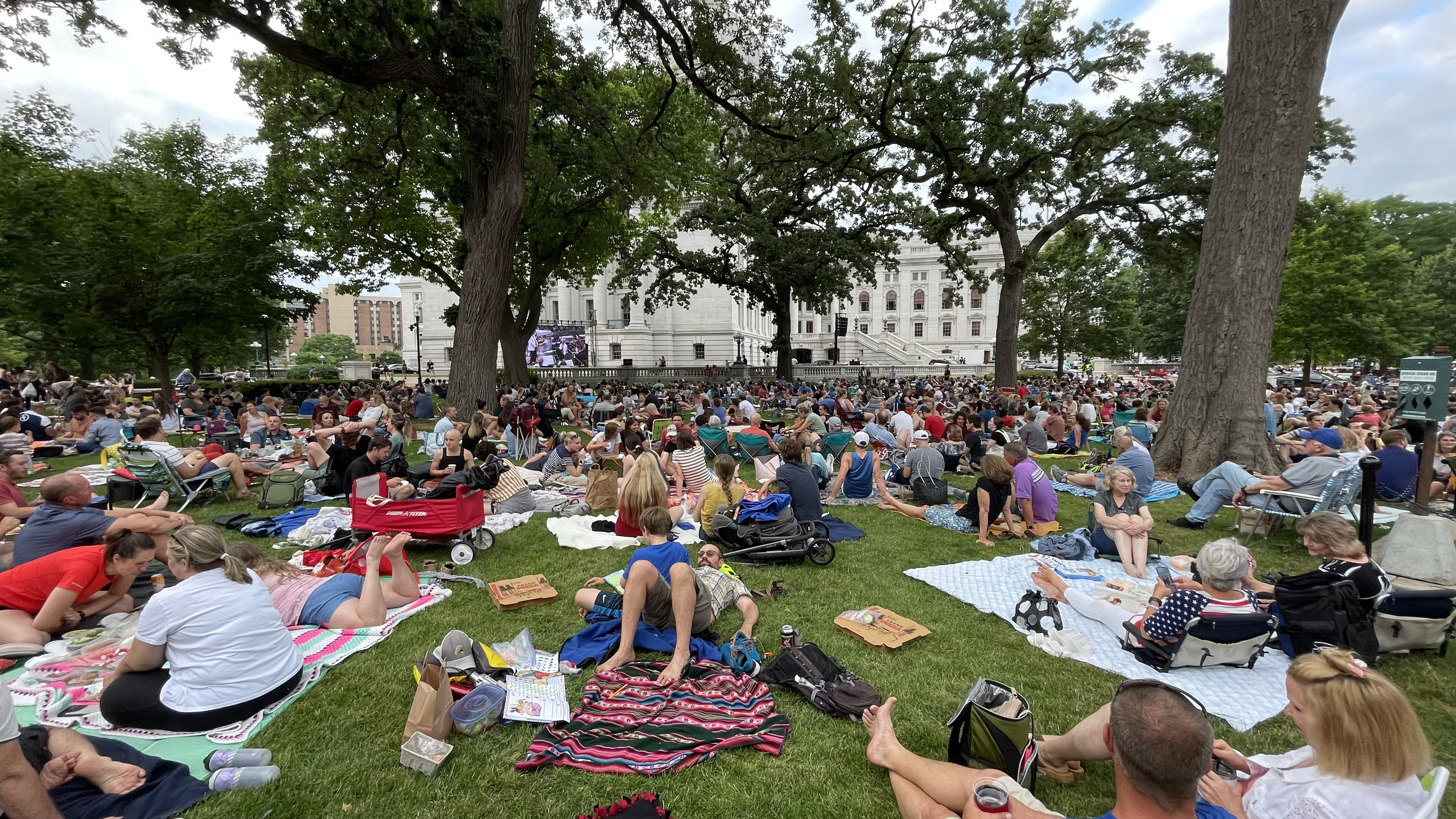
Concerts on the Square

Madison's music scene covers a spectrum of musical culture. Several venues offer live music nightly, ranging from Barrymore Theatre and High Noon Saloon on the east side to small coffee houses and wine bars. The biggest headliners sometimes perform at the Orpheum Theater, the Overture Center, Breese Stevens Field, the Alliant Energy Center, or the UW Theatre on campus. Other major rock and pop venues include the Majestic Theatre, the Sylvee, and the Bartell. During the summer, the Memorial Union Terrace on the University of Wisconsin campus, offers live music five nights a week. The Union is located on the shores of Lake Mendota.

In the summer, Madison hosts many music festivals. Concerts on the Square is a weekly Madison tradition during the summer. On Wednesday evenings, the Wisconsin Chamber Orchestra performs free concerts on the capitol's lawn, and spectators can listen to the music while picnicking on the grass. Other annual music events include the Waterfront Festival, the Willy Street Fair, Atwood Summerfest, the Isthmus Jazz Festival, the Orton Park Festival, 94.1 WJJO's Band Camp, Greekfest, the WORT Block Party and the Sugar Maple Traditional Music Festival, and the Madison World Music Festival. One of the latest additions is the La Fete de Marquette, taking place around Bastille Day at various east side locations and celebrating French music with Cajun influences. Madison also hosts an annual electronic music festival, Reverence, and the Folk Ball, a world music and Folk dance festival held annually in January. Madison also plays host to the National Women's Music Festival. UW-Madison also hosts the annual music and arts festival, Revelry, on campus at the Memorial Union each spring. The festival is put on by students for students as an end of the year celebration on campus.

The Madison Scouts Drum and Bugle Corps is a competitive drum corps group based in Madison that competes and tours across North America as part of Drum Corps International. The University of Wisconsin Marching Band performs at various local concerts and parades.

Madison has an independent rock scene, with local independent record labels including Crustacean Records, Science of Sound, Kind Turkey Records, and Art Paul Schlosser Inc. Madison was home to Smart Studios, Butch Vig and Steve Marker's longtime studio where many alternative rock records of the 1990s and 2000s were recorded and/or produced. A Dr. Demento and weekly live karaoke favorite is The Gomers. They have performed with fellow Wisconsin residents Les Paul and Steve Miller.

Madison is also home to notable artists such as Paul Kowert of Punch Brothers, Mama Digdown's Brass Band, Clyde Stubblefield of Funky Drummer and James Brown fame, and musicians Roscoe Mitchell, Richard Davis, Ben Sidran, Sexy Ester and the Pretty Mama Sisters, Reptile Palace Orchestra, Ted Park, DJ Pain 1, Killdozer, Zola Jesus, VO5, Caustic, Phox, Masked Intruder, and Lou & Peter Berryman, among others. The band Garbage formed in Madison in 1994, and has sold 17 million albums.

=== Nightlife ===
Much of the city's nightlife is centralized to the downtown area which includes a variety of bars, restaurants, and performance venues. State Street and the surrounding area are popular with tourists and University of Wisconsin-Madison students. Venues in the Capital Square neighborhood are popular with local young professionals and provide many happy hour specials. Another center of nightlife is the Williamson (Willy) Street Neighborhood. Madison is also home to a number of nightclubs, gay bars and live music venues. The Mifflin Street Block Party and the Freakfest Halloween Party also attract thousands of partygoers.

=== Performing arts ===
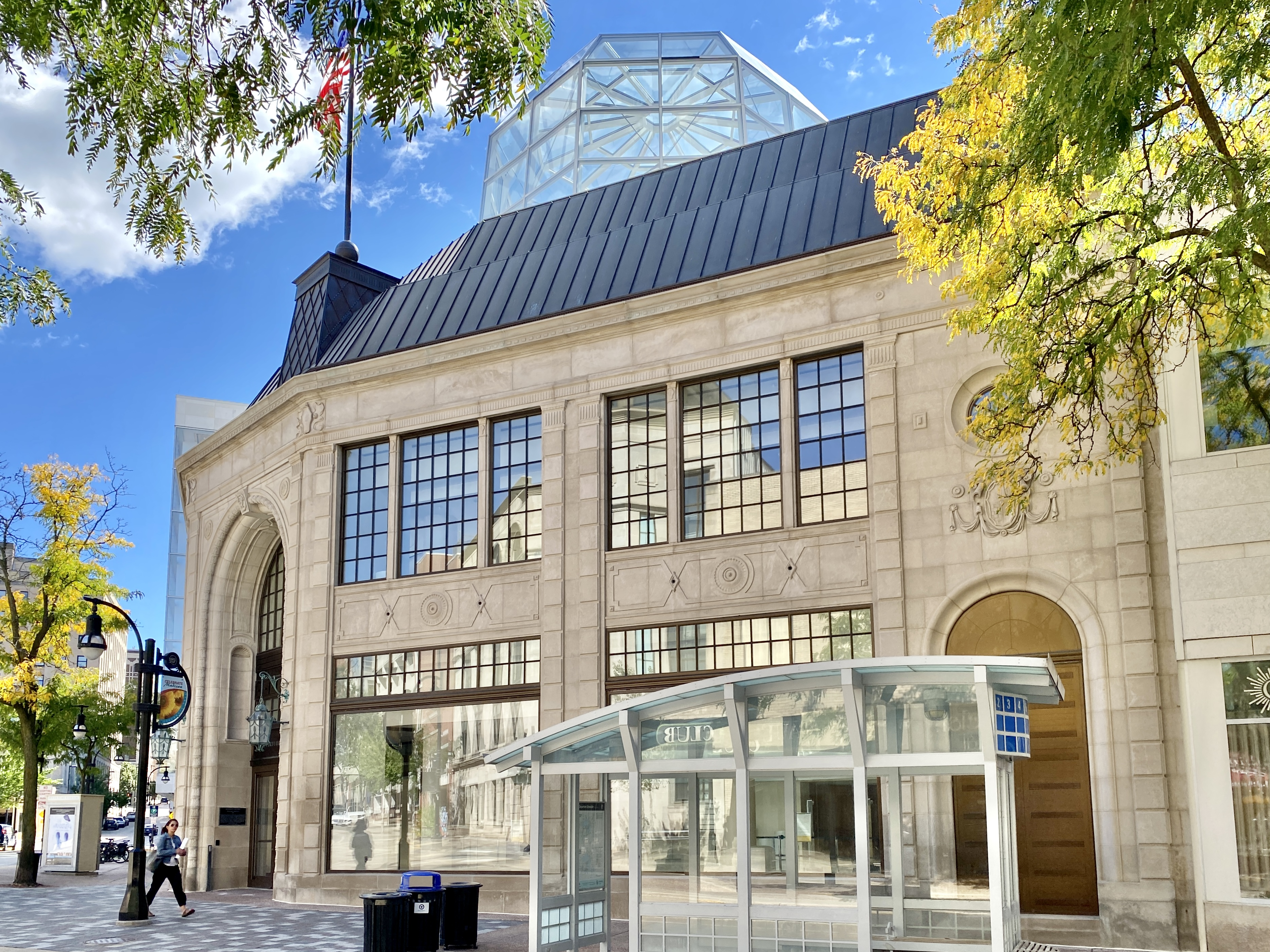
Overture Center for the Arts

The Madison Opera, the Madison Symphony Orchestra, Forward Theater Company, the Wisconsin Chamber Orchestra, and the Madison Ballet are some of the professional resident companies of the Overture Center for the Arts. The city is also home to a number of smaller performing arts organizations, including a group of theater companies that present in the Bartell Theatre, a former movie palace renovated into live theater spaces, and Opera for the Young, an opera company that performs for elementary school students across the Midwest. Music Theatre of Madison is a professional musical theater company that performs new and lesser-known musicals in a variety of venues. The Wisconsin Union Theater (a 1,300-seat theater) is home to seasonal attractions and is the main stage for Four Seasons Theatre, a community theater company specializing in musical theater, and other groups. The Young Shakespeare Players, a theater group for young people, performs uncut Shakespeare and George B. Shaw plays.

Madison is home to a large entertainment industry archive at the Wisconsin Center for Film and Theater Research, part of the Wisconsin Historical Society.

=== Other cultural events ===
Madison was host to Rhythm and Booms, a large fireworks celebration coordinated to music. It began with a fly-over by F-16s from the local Wisconsin Air National Guard. This celebration was the largest fireworks display in the Midwest in length, number of shells fired, and the size of its annual budget. Effective 2015, the event location was changed to downtown and renamed Shake The Lake.

There are several cooperative organizations in the Madison area, ranging from grocery stores (such as the Willy Street Cooperative) to housing co-ops (such as Madison Community Cooperative and Nottingham Housing Cooperative) to worker cooperatives (including an engineering firm, a wholesale organic bakery and a cab company).

Every April, the Wisconsin Film Festival is held in Madison. This five-day event features films from a variety of genres shown in theaters across the city. The University of Wisconsin–Madison Arts Institute sponsors the Film Festival.

Madison's official bird is the plastic flamingo, a type of lawn ornament. The city council adopted the plastic flamingo in 2009 following a campaign by a local newspaper columnist in reference to a 1979 prank by UW–Madison students who planted 1,008 plastic flamingos on Bascom Hill. The flamingo appears in the logo of the city's professional soccer team, Forward Madison FC.

== Sports ==
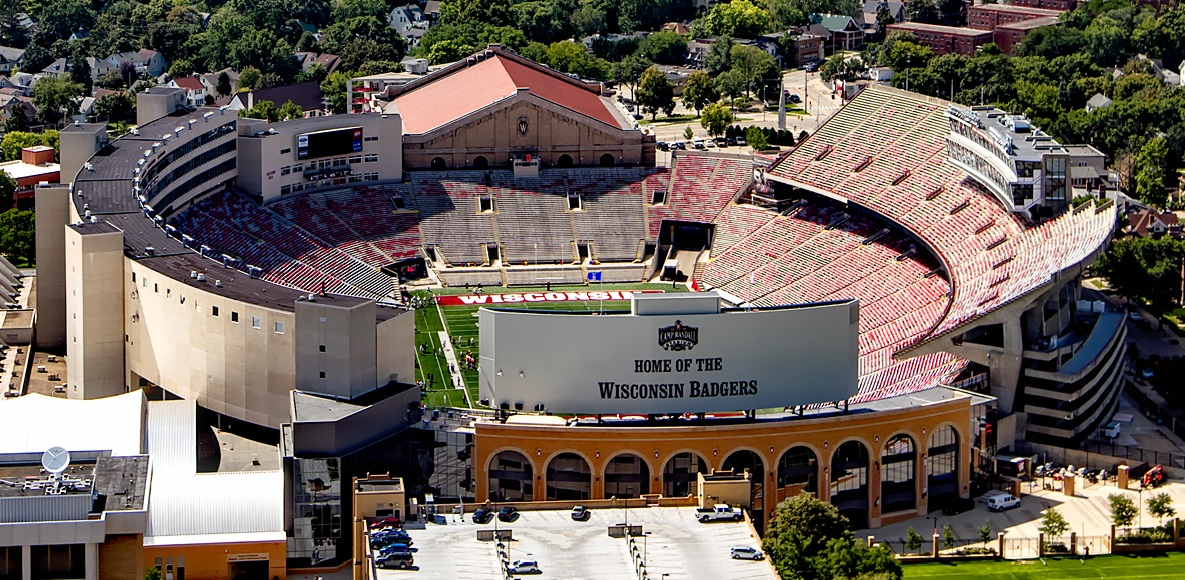
Camp Randall Stadium is home to the Wisconsin Badgers football team.

Club	Sport	Founded	Current league	Stadium
Forward Madison FC	Soccer	2018	USL League One	Breese Stevens Field
Rally Madison FC	Soccer	2026	USL W League	Breese Stevens Field
Wisconsin Badgers	15 varsity teams		Big Ten Conference	
LOVB Madison	Indoor Volleyball	2023	LOVB Pro	Alliant Energy Center
Madison Capitols	Junior ice hockey	2014	United States Hockey League	Bob Suter's Capitol Ice Arena

Madison's most prominent athletics are centered on the University of Wisconsin–Madison, whose teams compete as the Wisconsin Badgers in NCAA Division I. The Wisconsin Badgers football team plays at Camp Randall Stadium where crowds of as many as 83,000 have attended games. The Wisconsin Badgers men's basketball and Wisconsin Badgers men's ice hockey teams play at the Kohl Center, while the Wisconsin Badgers women's ice hockey team plays at LaBahn Arena. Some events are played at the county-owned Alliant Energy Center and the university-owned Wisconsin Field House.

Forward Madison FC became Madison's first professional soccer team in 2018 and are members of USL League One. They play their home matches at Breese Stevens Field. A professional women's soccer club will join the USL Super League in 2025. Other pro-level teams in the city include the Madison Radicals, an ultimate frisbee club of the Ultimate Frisbee Association which debuted in 2013, and LOVB Madison, a member of League One Volleyball.

The Madison Capitols of the junior-level United States Hockey League were revived in 2014 and play their home games at Bob Suter's Capitol Ice Arena. The Madison Mallards are a college wood-bat summer baseball league team in the Northwoods League. They play in Warner Park on the city's north side from June to August. The Madison Night Mares summer softball team competes in the same league.

=== Former teams ===
The Madison Cardinals were an early football team that lost each of the three games they ever played, all coming in 1936. Two were in the Northwest Football League and the third was a 62-0 exhibition blowout to the Green Bay Packers. The Cardinals failed to attract University of Wisconsin graduates as promised, and the La Crosse Old Style Lagers ran up the score in a 100-0 drubbing intending to push them out of the league. The Cardinals folded just days later.

The Madison Muskies, a Class-A Midwest League affiliate of the Oakland Athletics, left town in 1993 after 11 seasons. The Madison Hatters, another Class-A Midwest League team, played in Madison for only the 1994 season. The Madison Black Wolf, an independent Northern League franchise lasted five seasons (1996–2000) before decamping for Lincoln, Nebraska.

=== Amateur sports ===
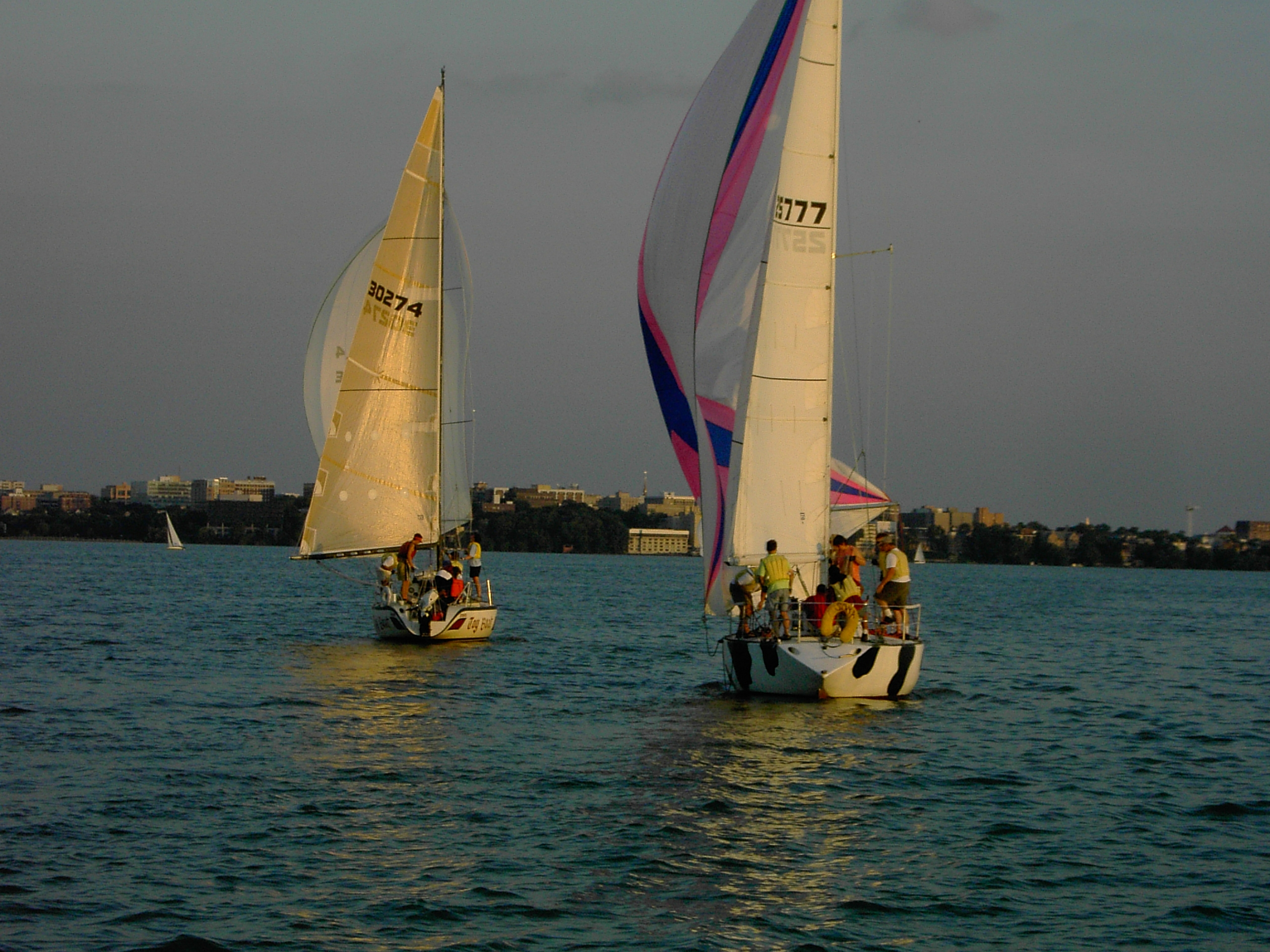
Sailboats approaching the south shore of Lake Mendota and northern downtown Madison

Madison is home to several endurance sports racing events, such as the Crazylegs Classic, Paddle and Portage, the Mad City Marathon, and Ironman Wisconsin, which attracts over 45,000 spectators. The CrossFit Games were held at the Alliant Energy Center from 2017 to 2023. Madison has several active ultimate disc leagues organized through the nonprofit Madison Ultimate Frisbee Association.

Madison United Rugby senior level clubs include the Wisconsin Rugby Club, the 1998 and 2013 USA Rugby Division II National Champions, the Wisconsin Women's Rugby Football Club, and the Madison Minotaurs. The Madison Curling Club was founded in 1921 and one of its teams won the 2014 Women's US National Championship. Madison's Gaelic sports club hosts a hurling team organized as the Hurling Club of Madison and a Gaelic football club with men's and women's teams.

The roller derby league, Madison Roller Derby, was formed in Madison in 2004 and is a member of the Women's Flat Track Derby Association. Madison is also home to Wisconsin United Roller Derby, a member league of the Men's Roller Derby Association.

The Blackhawk Ski Club, formed in 1947, provides ski jumping, cross-country skiing and alpine skiing. The club's programs have produced several Olympic ski jumpers, two Olympic ski jumping coaches and one Olympic ski jumping director. The club had the first Nordic ski facility with lighted night jumping.

== Parks and recreation ==
Madison has 6,431 acres (26.03 km^{2}) of park space, which is 13.5% of the city's total area. Parks in the city include James Madison Park, which has views of Lake Mendota; Frank W. Hoyt Park, which is listed on the National Register of Historic Places; Garner Park, where the Madison Opera holds an "Opera in the Park" event; and Warner Park, which is home to the stadium for the Madison Mallards baseball team. Goodman Pool is Madison's public outdoor swimming pool.

The University of Wisconsin–Madison Arboretum manages 520 acres (210 ha) of remnant forests and prairies throughout Wisconsin. The 300-acre (1.2 km^{2}) Lakeshore Nature Preserve preserves native species along the southern shore of Lake Mendota.

During the winter months, sports enthusiasts enjoy ice boating, ice skating, ice hockey, ice fishing, cross-country skiing, and snowkiting. During the rest of the year, outdoor recreation includes sailing on the local lakes, bicycling, and hiking.

Madison has numerous bike paths and bike lanes throughout the city. Several connect to state trails, such as the Capital City State Trail, Military Ridge State Trail, and Badger State Trail. In addition, most city streets have designated bike lanes or are designated as bicycle boulevards, which give high priority to bicyclists. In 2015 Madison was awarded platinum level Bicycle Friendly Community designation from the League of American Bicyclists, one of only five cities in the US to receive this (highest) level. Madison has maintained the platinum level designation from 2015 to 2024.

Brittingham Park on Monona Bay

== Government ==
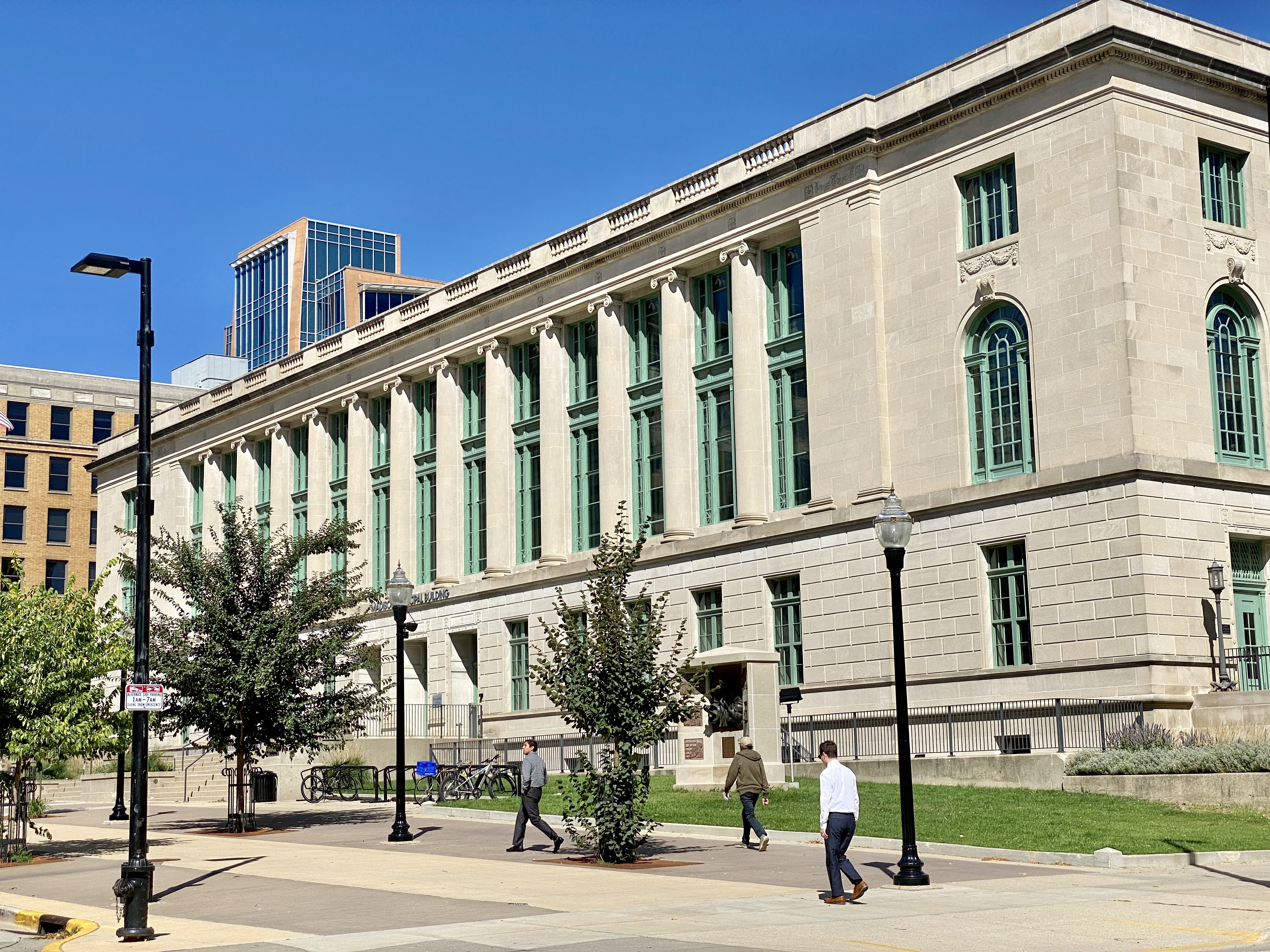
Madison Municipal Building

City voters have supported the Democratic Party in national elections in the last half-century, and a liberal and progressive majority is generally elected to the city council. Detractors often refer to Madison as "77 square miles surrounded by reality", a phrase coined by former Wisconsin Republican governor Lee S. Dreyfus, while campaigning in 1978. In 2013, there was a motion in the city council to turn Dreyfus' humor into the official city "punchline", but it was voted down by the city council.

Madison is considered to be the most politically liberal and progressive city in Wisconsin. For example, 76% of Madison voters voted against a 2006 state constitutional amendment to ban gay marriage, even though the ban passed statewide with 59% of the vote.

In 1992, a local third party, Progressive Dane, was founded. City policies supported in the Progressive Dane platform have included an inclusionary zoning ordinance, later abandoned by the mayor and a majority of the city council, and a city minimum wage. The party holds several seats on the Madison City Council and Dane County Board of Supervisors, and is aligned variously with the Democratic and Green parties.

Madison has a mayor-council system of government. Madison's city council, known as the Common Council, consists of 20 members, one from each district. The mayor is elected in a citywide vote.

Madison is the heart of Wisconsin's 2nd congressional district in the United States House of Representatives, represented by Mark Pocan (D). Melissa Agard (D) and Kelda Roys (D) represent Madison in the Wisconsin State Senate, and Jimmy P. Anderson (D), Samba Baldeh (D), Francesca Hong (D), Sheila Stubbs (D), and Lisa Subeck (D) represent Madison in the Wisconsin State Assembly.

Ron Johnson (R) and Tammy Baldwin (D) represent Madison, and all of Wisconsin, in the United States Senate. Baldwin is a Madison resident; she represented the 2nd from 1999 to 2013 before handing it to Pocan.

=== Election results ===
Madison city vote by party in presidential elections
Year	Democratic	Republican	Third parties
2024	82.98% 143,971	15.12% 26,242	1.90% 3,290
2020	84.10% 136,007	14.30% 23,122	1.60% 2,582
2016	78.41% 120,178	15.04% 23,052	6.55% 10,037

== Education ==
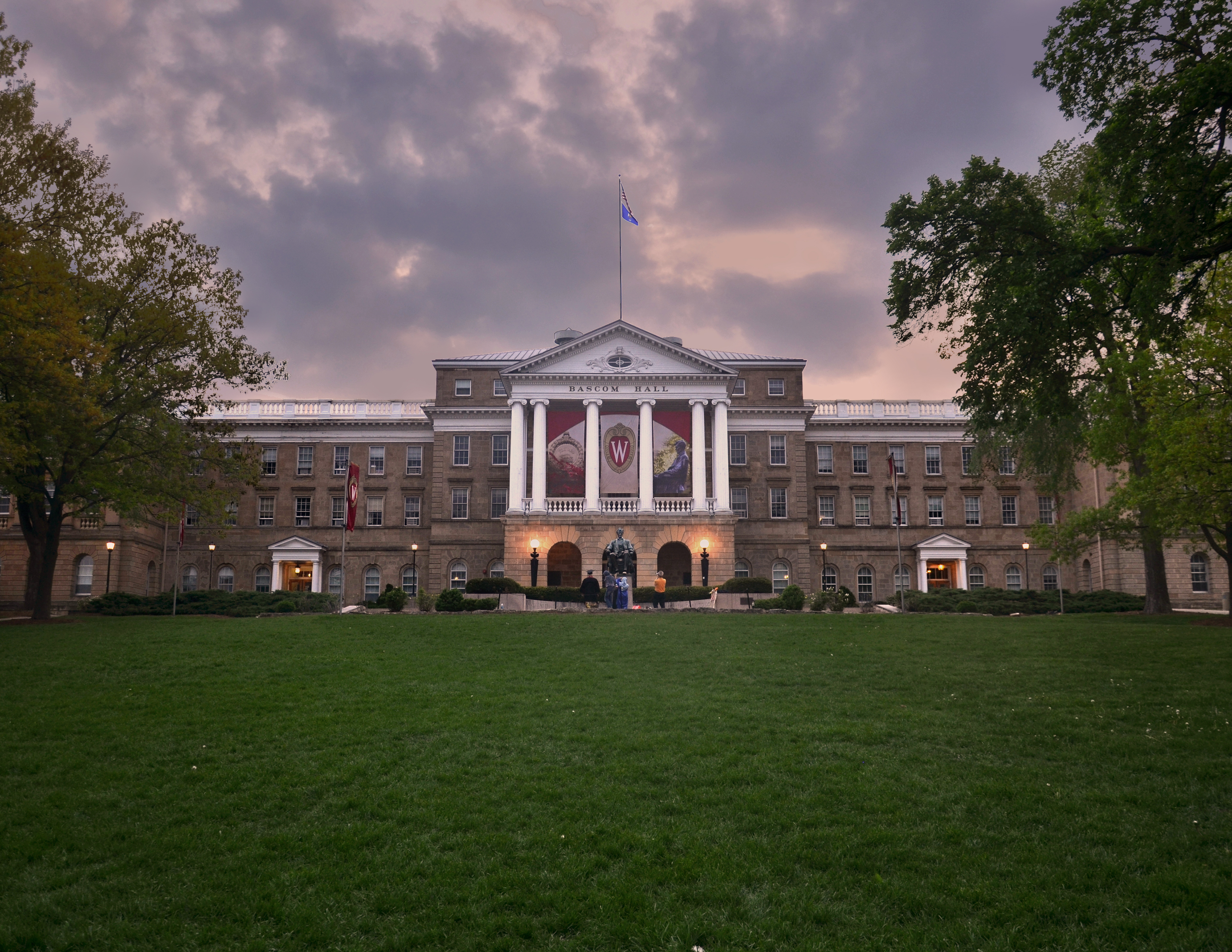
Bascom Hill forms the historic core of the University of Wisconsin–Madison campus.

The Madison Metropolitan School District serves the city while a variety of other districts serve the surrounding area. With an enrollment of approximately 25,000 students in 46 schools, it is the second largest school district in Wisconsin behind the Milwaukee School District. The five public high schools are Vel Phillips Memorial, Madison West, Madison East, La Follette, and Malcolm Shabazz City High School, an alternative school.

Among private church-related high schools are Abundant Life Christian School, Edgewood High School, near the Edgewood University campus, and St. Ambrose Academy, a Catholic school offering grades 6 through 12. Madison Country Day School is a private high school with no religious affiliation.

Madison has a post-secondary student population of nearly 65,000. The University of Wisconsin–Madison, the flagship campus of the University of Wisconsin System, accounts for the vast majority of students, with an enrollment of roughly 50,000 total students and 37,000 undergraduates. The city is also home to the main campuses of Edgewood University and Madison Area Technical College, as well as branches of Herzing University and Lakeland University.

== Media ==
=== Print ===
Madison is home to an extensive and varied number of print publications, reflecting the city's role as the state capital and its diverse political, cultural and academic population. The Wisconsin State Journal (weekday circulation: ~95,000; Sundays: ~155,000) is published in the mornings, while its sister publication, The Capital Times (Thursday supplement to the Journal) is published online daily, with two printed editions a week. Though jointly operated under the name Capital Newspapers, the Journal is owned by the national chain Lee Enterprises, and the Times is independently owned. Wisconsin State Journal is the descendant of the Wisconsin Express, a paper founded in the Wisconsin Territory in 1839. The Capital Times was founded in 1917 by William T. Evjue, a business manager for the State Journal who disagreed with that paper's editorial criticisms of Wisconsin Republican Senator Robert M. La Follette, Sr. for his opposition to U.S. entry into World War I.

The free weekly alternative newspaper Isthmus (weekly circulation: ~65,000) was founded in Madison in 1976. The Onion, a satirical weekly, was founded in Madison in 1988 and published from there until it moved to New York in 2001. Two student newspapers are published during the academic year, The Daily Cardinal (Mon–Fri circulation: ~10,000) and The Badger Herald (Mon–Fri circulation: ~16,000). Other specialty print publications focus on local music, politics and sports, including The Capital City Hues, The Madison Times, Madison Magazine, The Simpson Street Free Press, Umoja Magazine, and fantasy-sports web site RotoWire.com. Local community blogs include Althouse and dane101.

Madison is associated with "Fighting Bob" La Follette and the Progressive movement. La Follette's magazine, The Progressive, founded in 1909, is still published in Madison. It is a far left-wing periodical that may be best known for the attempt of the U.S. government in 1979 to suppress one of its articles before publication. The magazine eventually prevailed in the landmark First Amendment case, United States v. The Progressive, Inc. During the 1970s, there were two radical weeklies published in Madison, known as TakeOver and Free for All, as well as a Madison edition of the Bugle-American underground newspaper.

=== Radio ===
Madison has three large media companies that own the majority of the commercial radio stations within the market. These companies consist of iHeartMedia, Entercom Communications, and Mid-West Family Broadcasting as well as other smaller broadcasters. Madison is home to Mid-West Family Broadcasting, which is an independently owned broadcasting company that originated and is headquartered in Madison. Mid-West Family owns radio stations throughout the state and the Midwest.

Madison hosts two volunteer-operated and community-oriented radio stations, WORT and WSUM. WORT Community Radio (89.9 FM), founded in 1975, is one of the oldest volunteer-powered radio stations in the United States. A listener-sponsored community radio station, WORT offers locally produced diverse music and talk programming. WSUM (91.7 FM) is a free-form student radio station programmed and operated almost entirely by students.

Madison's Wisconsin Public Radio station, WHA, was one of the first radio stations in the nation to begin broadcasting. Public radio programs that originate at the WPR studios include Michael Feldman's Whad'Ya Know?, Zorba Pastor On Your Health, To the Best of Our Knowledge, Calling All Pets, and the longest running radio program in America, Chapter a Day.

WXJ-87 is the NOAA Weather Radio All Hazards station on Madison's west side, with broadcasts originating from the National Weather Service in Sullivan, Wisconsin.

=== TV ===
Madison has six commercial stations, two public television stations and a religious station. The commercial stations consist of WISC-TV (CBS) and its MyNetworkTV subchannel, TVW; WMTV (NBC), with a CW+ subchannel; WKOW-TV (ABC); WMSN-TV (Fox); WIFS (Ion);WZCK-LD/W23BW-D (various subchannel networks); WMWD-LD (Daystar) and WMWI (ONTV4U) also serve the area. Madison has two public television stations: WHA-TV, which is owned by the University of Wisconsin–Extension and airs throughout the state with the exception of Milwaukee, and cable's Madison City Channel, which is owned and operated by the City of Madison covering city governmental affairs. Until December 2025 Madison was the headquarters for WisconsinEye, a statewide public affairs television network which broadcast the activity of the Wisconsin Legislature. At the end of 2025 the network stopped its broadcasts due to an inability to raise funds.

== Infrastructure ==
=== Transportation ===
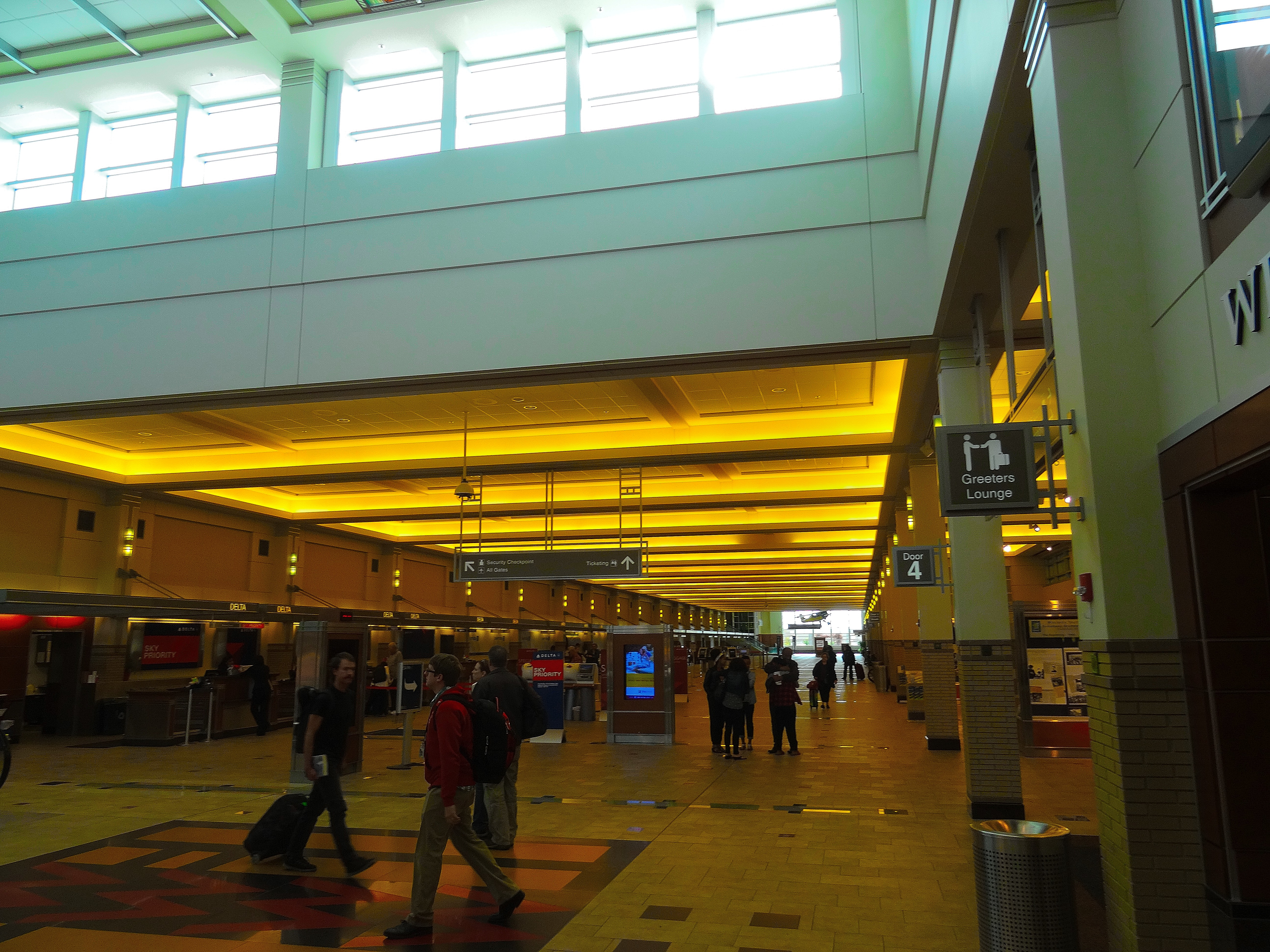
Terminal at Dane County Regional Airport

Madison is served by the Dane County Regional Airport, which serves nearly 2.2 million passengers annually. Most major general aviation operations take place at Middleton Municipal Airport 15 miles (24 km) from Madison's city center. Metro Transit operates bus routes throughout the city and to some neighboring suburbs. While passenger rail is not available within the city limits, the Madison area is served by Amtrak thruway bus service that connects the city to rail hubs at Milwaukee Intermodal Station and Chicago Union Station as well via the Columbus station 20 miles (32 km) northeast of the city.

Starting from the last decades of the 20th century, Madison has been among the leading cities for bicycling as a form of transportation, with about 3% of working residents pedaling on their journey to work. The share of Madison workers who bicycled to work increased to 5.3% by 2014. The 2016 survey by American Community Survey indicated that 65.7% of working Madison residents commuted by driving alone, 6.7% carpooled, 8.6% used public transportation, and 8.5% walked. About 6% used all other forms of transportation, including bicycles, motorcycles, and taxis. About 4.5% worked at home.

In 2015, 11.2% of Madison households were without a car, which was unchanged in 2016. The national average was 8.7% in 2016. Madison averaged 1.5 cars per household in 2016, compared to a national average of 1.8 per household.

==== Highways ====
Interstate 39 (I-39), I-90 and I-94 run along the far east side of the city, connecting to Janesville to the south, Milwaukee to the east, and to Portage, La Crosse, Eau Claire, and Wausau heading north and northwest.

US 12, frequently referred to by locals as the Beltline, is a six- to eight-lane freeway serving the south and west sides of Madison and is the main link from the western suburb of Middleton to Cambridge. Southeast of the area, US 12 connects to Lake Geneva, and going northwest, it heads to Wisconsin Dells. US 18 is also a component highway of the Beltine, continuing south along US 151 and east towards Waukesha and Milwaukee. U.S. Highway 151 (US 151) runs through downtown and serves as the main thoroughfare through the northeast (as Washington Avenue) and south-central parts (as Park Street) of the city, connecting Madison with Dubuque, Iowa, to the southwest and Fond du Lac and Manitowoc to the northeast.

==== Mass and intercity transit ====
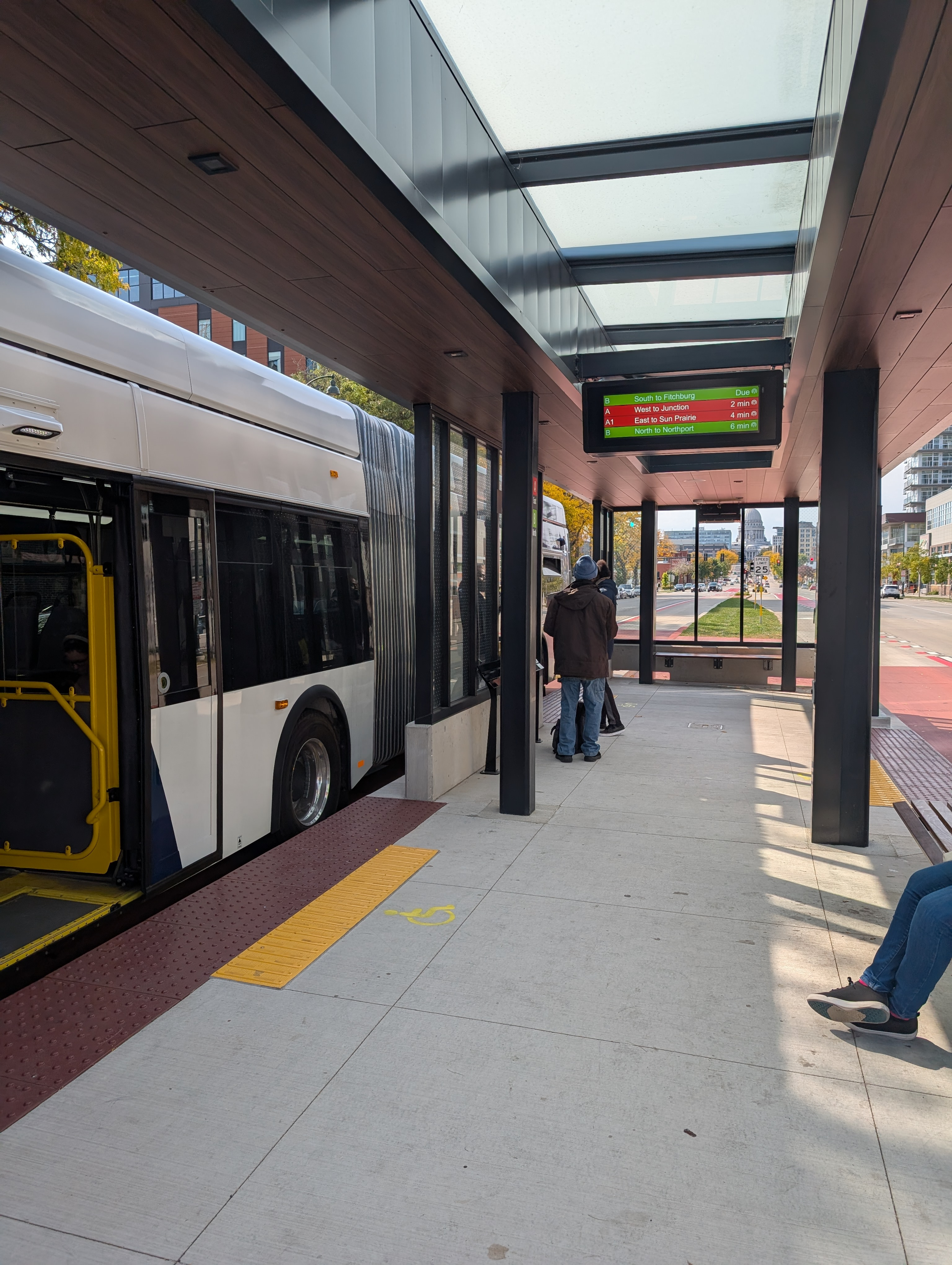
A Metro Transit bus arriving at a bus rapid transit platform

Metro Transit, Madison's public transportation network, operates bus services throughout the city and several suburbs. Its operations were absorbed by the city in 1970. The transit network focuses on point-to-point transit service. Metro Transit launched its first bus rapid transit line in 2024.

In addition to public transportation, regional buses connect Madison to various major cities across the Upper Midwest. Badger Bus connects Madison and Milwaukee Intermodal Station and General Mitchell International Airport, running several trips daily, Badger Bus also offers weekend service to Minneapolis-St. Paul. Greyhound Lines serves Madison on its Chicago, Milwaukee, and Minneapolis–Saint Paul route. Van Galder Bus Company, a subsidiary of Coach USA, provides transportation through Rockford to Chicago—stopping at Union Station and O'Hare Airport, Van Galder also provides daily service to Wausau and Green Bay. Wisconsin Coach Lines, another subsidiary of Coach USA offers daily service to La Crosse and Milwaukee Intermodal Station. Jefferson Lines provides transportation to Minneapolis–Saint Paul and Milwaukee Intermodal Station. Lamers Bus Lines has once-daily trips from Madison to Dubuque, Iowa, and Milwaukee. Flixbus offers daily service to Minneapolis, Milwaukee, Chicago, Indianapolis and Cincinnati.

==== Rail ====
Railroad freight services are provided to Madison by the Wisconsin and Southern Railroad (WSOR) and Canadian Pacific Kansas City (CPKC). Passenger train service between Madison and Chicago on the Sioux and the Varsity was provided by the Chicago, Milwaukee, St. Paul and Pacific Railroad (Milwaukee Road) until 1971. The Chicago and North Western Railway also provided service to the east side of Madison, ending in 1965.

The city is served by Amtrak via Columbus station 28 miles (45 km) to the northeast, which serves the daily long-distance Empire Builder terminating at Chicago, Portland and Seattle. Columbus station is also served by the Amtrak Midwest Borealis route which terminates at Chicago and Saint Paul. Although located outside of the city proper, the station is listed on Amtrak timetables as Madison's official stop.

A high-speed rail route from Chicago through Milwaukee and Madison to Minneapolis–Saint Paul was proposed as part of the Midwest Regional Rail Initiative, but then-incoming Governor Scott Walker's opposition to the project led to the reallocation of funding. Plans to establish Amtrak service within Madison were revived in 2021. Anticipating eventual revival of passenger service, public meetings were held in early 2024 by the city's Department of Transportation to consider possible sites for the station.

=== Public safety ===
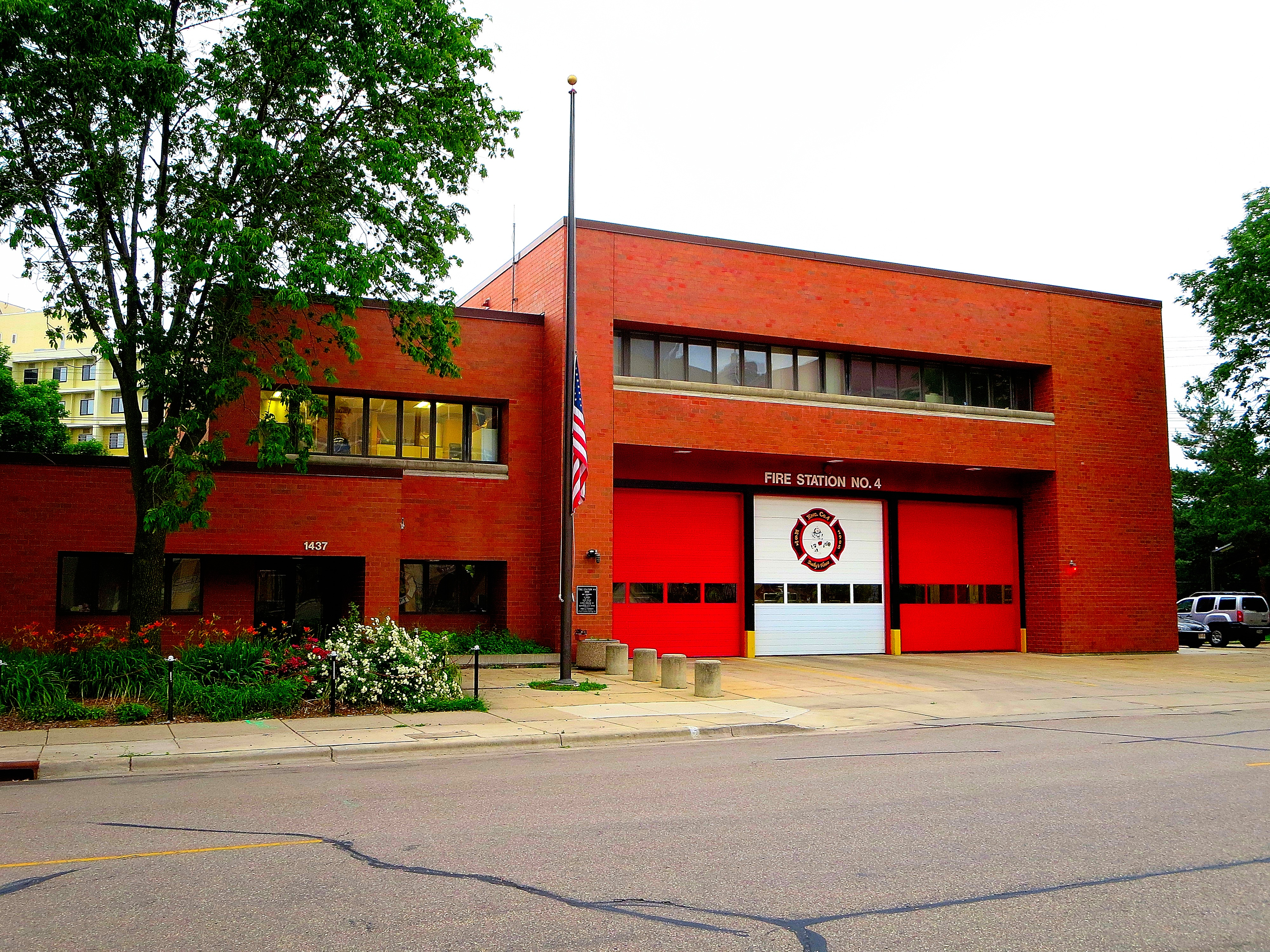
Madison Fire Station 4, one of 14 across the city

The Madison Fire Department (MFD) provides fire protection and emergency medical services to the city. The MFD operates out of 14 fire stations, with a fleet of 12 engines, 5 ladders, 2 rescue squads, 2 hazmat units, a lake rescue team, and ten ambulances. The MFD is contracted to provide fire and EMS services to the suburban enclave village of Shorewood Hills and also provides mutual aid to surrounding communities. In 2021 MFD, in conjunction with Journey Mental Health, launched an emergency mental health response team consisting of a paramedic and a social worker to respond to mental health emergencies. The program launched in the city and has expanded to serve Sun Prairie.

The Madison Police Department is the law enforcement agency in the city. The department has six districts: Central, East, North, South, West and Midtown. Special units in the police department include the K9 Unit, Crime Scene Unit, Forensic Unit, Narcotics and Gangs Task Force, Parking Enforcement, Traffic Enforcement Safety Team, SWAT Team, Special Events Team, C.O.P.S (Safety Education), Mounted Patrol, Crime Stoppers, and Amigos en Azul.

The Madison Police Department was criticized for absolving Officer Steve Heimsness of any wrongdoing in the November 2012 shooting death of an unarmed man, Paul Heenan. The department's actions resulted in community protests, including demands that the shooting be examined and reviewed by an independent investigative body. Community criticism of the department's practices resurfaced after MPD officer Matt Kenny shot Tony Robinson, an unarmed man. The shooting was particularly controversial given the context of the ongoing Black Lives Matter movement. Due to new Wisconsin state legislation that addresses the mechanisms under which officer-on-civilian violence is handled by state prosecutors, proceedings were handed over to a special unit of the Wisconsin Department of Justice, which gave its findings to Ismael Ozanne, the district attorney of Dane County. On May 12, 2015, Ozanne determined that the shooting was justified self-defense.

== Nicknames ==
Over the years, Madison has acquired nicknames and slogans that include:

- Mad City
- Madtown
- The Berkeley of the Midwest
- 77 square miles surrounded by reality
- Four Lakes City
- People's Republic of Madison

== Sister cities ==
Madison is twinned with:

- (Timor-Leste) Ainaro, East Timor (2002)
- Arcatao, El Salvador (1986)
- Bahir Dar, Ethiopia (2019)
- Camagüey, Cuba (1994)
- Cusco, Peru (2022)
- Freiburg im Breisgau, Germany (1988)
- (The Gambia) Kanifing, Gambia (2016)
- Mantua, Italy (2001)
- Obihiro, Japan (2003)
- Tepatitlán de Morelos, Mexico (2012)
- Vilnius, Lithuania (1988)

The city previously maintained sister city relationships with Managua, the capital city of Nicaragua, and Bắc Giang, Vietnam, but terminated both of these in 2010 due to inactivity. Madison was also previously twinned with Oslo, the capital city of Norway, but Oslo terminated the relationship in 2004; the Madison Sister City Collaboration Committee continued to list the relationship with Oslo as active as of 2010.

In 2004, amid the Second Intifada, the Madison city council considered a proposal to establish a sister city relationship with Rafah, a Palestinian city in the Gaza Strip under siege during the then-ongoing 2004 Israeli military offensive. The relationship would have been the first between an American city and a Palestinian city. After a lengthy debate, the proposal received nine of the needed 11 votes to pass the council; had it passed, Mayor Dave Cieslewicz had said he would veto the measure. An unofficial cultural exchange between the two cities has been maintained ever since, including during the destruction of most of Rafah in the Gaza war, by the Madison–Rafah Sister City Project, an organization founded in 2003 which had championed the 2004 proposal.

== See also ==
- List of cities in Wisconsin
- List of tallest buildings in Madison
