= Leonard House =

Leonard House may refer to:

in the United States

(by state then city)

- Leonard–Akin House, in Vienna, Georgia, listed on the National Register of Historic Places (NRHP) in Dooly County
- Clifford Milton Leonard Farm, in Lake Forest, Illinois, listed on the NRHP in Lake County
- Leonard House (Greensboro, Maryland), NRHP-listed in Caroline County
- Capt. Charles Leonard House, in Agawam, Massachusetts, NRHP-listed
- James Leonard House, in Taunton, Massachusetts, NRHP-listed
- Chauncey B. Leonard House, in Berlin, Vermont, listed on the NRHP in Washington County
- William Ellery Leonard House, in Madison, Wisconsin, listed on the NRHP in Dane County
