= Four Lakes =

Four Lakes can refer to:

- Four Lakes (Idaho)
- A group of lakes in southern Wisconsin
  - Lake Kegonsa
  - Lake Mendota
  - Lake Monona
  - Lake Waubesa
- Four Lakes, Washington
- Battle of Four Lakes
