= Northwest Side Historic District =

Historic district in Wisconsin, United States

- U.S. National Register of Historic Places
- U.S. Historic district
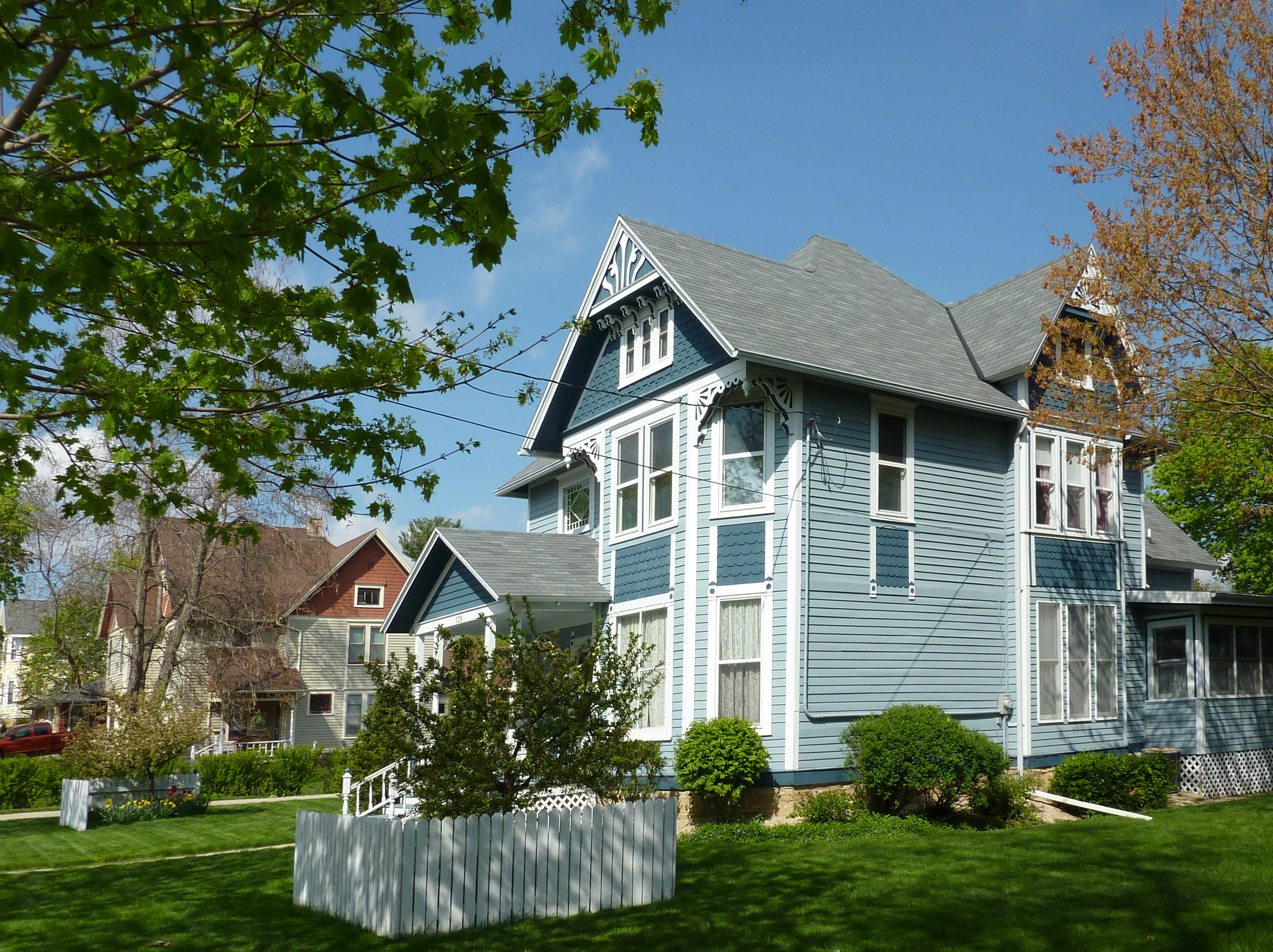
- A house within the district, April 2014
- Location: Roughly bounded by Van Buren, Clyde, Grant, and Main streets and the Yahara River; Stoughton, Wisconsin; United States
- Area: 90 acres (36 ha)
- NRHP reference No.: 98000221
- Added to NRHP: March 5, 1998

The Northwest Side Historic District is residential district in central Stoughton, Wisconsin, United States with 251 contributing homes built from 1854 to 1930. In 1998, the neighborhood was listed on the National Register of Historic Places.

Settlement of Stoughton began in 1847, when Luke Stoughton, an immigrant from Vermont, bought 800 acres along the Catfish River, built a sawmill there, and platted a town. Part of that original plat overlaps the southeast part of the historic district described in this article. The town grew, especially when the Milwaukee and Mississippi Railroad built a line into town in 1853. The big cash crop in the area shifted from wheat 1850s to tobacco by the 1860s. Wagon-building became an important industry in the 1860s. The village incorporated in 1868, with about 950 people. The early population of the town was largely Yankees, but Norwegian immigrants began to arrive in the 1870s. By 1900 about 75% of the population had Norwegian roots and the town was known as "Little Norway."

The district was added to the State Register of Historic Places in 1997 and to the National Register of Historic Places March 5, 1998. It is roughly bounded by Van Buren Street on the west, Clyde Street on the north, Grant Street and the Yahara River on the east, and Main Street on the south.

Here are some interesting examples of different styles of houses in the district, in roughly the order built:

- The Nathan Parker house at 600 West Main Street is a 1 1/2-story Greek Revival-styled frame house built in 1854–55. Characteristic of the style are the rather low-pitched roof, the frieze boards and cornice returns, the corner pilasters, and the sidelights and transom that frame the front door.
- The Charles Allen house at 408 W. Washington St. is a 1 1/2-story gabled ell form house, with the roof pitch and simple cornice returns showing some Greek Revival stylings.
- The Paul Tannert house at 309 N. Page St. is a more refined example of Italianate style, with fancier brackets and more formal frames around the windows. This house was built in 1883. Leslie Vollmert observes in the NRHP nomination that the upper-class of Stoughton were faithful to the Italianate style for many years after it went out of style elsewhere, with Italianate stylings appearing in a house built in 1904.
- The Annie Wyman house at 224 N. Page St. is a rather restrained wooden Italianate-styled 2-story house built in 1885. The house's hip roof and broad eaves supported by brackets are characteristic features of Italianate style.
- The Gerard house at 118 N. Page St. is a Queen Anne-styled cottage built in 1886, with the shingles in the gable ends and asymmetric wrap-around porch which are hallmarks of the style. The porch is decorated with elaborate spindle-work, with a round section with a pointed roof built into the corner. Era Gerard was a lumber man from Michigan, and vice-president of Stoughton Light and Fuel.
- The Torgeson house at 516 W. Hamilton St. is a two-story house built in 1888 in Second Empire style, whose hallmark is the mansard roof. In this case, the front of the house is dominated by a broad centered tower topped with a large metal cresting. The porches on each side of the tower were added later and are more Queen Anne in style than Second Empire.
- The Turner house at 102 W. Prospect St. is a 2 1/2-story Queen Anne house built in 1890. Though clad in brick, it has many of the same standard Queen Anne features: the complex roof, the shingles in the gables, and the asymmetric wrap-around porch. Sarah Turner was a daughter of Luke Stoughton, who founded Stoughton. O.M. dealt in lumber and tobacco. Christ Olson was a later owner, and Our Savior's Lutheran Church bought the house for a parsonage around 1903.
- When the Sampson house at 225 N. Monroe St was built in 1904, many Queen Anne designs had simpler rooflines and some elements borrowed from Classical Revival style, like the columned porch of this house. This later sub-type is called Queen Anne Free Classic. John Sampson managed a hardware store.
- The Erickson (Gricke?) house at 100 S. Van Buren St., built in 1902, is a fine example of this Queen Anne Free Classic style, with a wrap-around porch supported by Ionic columns, a loggia on the second story, and palladian windows framed with pilasters on the third story. Edward Erickson worked at a wagon works, ran a restaurant and saloon, and sold real estate.
- The Terry house at 206 W. Prospect is pure Colonial Revival - a 2 1/2-story home built in 1904 with a large 2-story portico framed in Corinthian columns and a pediment. Ole Terry was president of the Department Company Store, but was killed in a train accident after this house was built.
- The Hazel and Roy Patterson house at 716 Hamilton St. is a 2-story Prairie style house built in 1912. This is not the flat-roofed, ground-hugging Prairie style associated with Frank Lloyd Wright, but is Prairie style in its emphasis on horizontal lines and in its clean independence of any architecture from Europe.
- The Criddle house at 125 S. Monroe St. is a 2 1/2-story American Foursquare-style house built in 1915, clad in brick with elegant windows and a wrap-around porch that is unusual for a Foursquare. J. Criddle was a florist.
- The George Ford house at 200 S. Monroe St. is a 2-story Dutch Colonial Revival-style home built in 1921, with the gambrel roof that is the hallmark of the style, and a sun porch.
- The Frank Page house at 416 N. Page St. is a 2 1/2-story Craftsman bungalow built in 1922, clad in wood.
- The Brewer house at 424 W. Main is a 2-story Craftsman house built in 1922, clad in brick and stucco.
- The Brickson house at 408 N. Page St. is a 2-story Spanish Colonial Revival house built in 1922. It has various parapets, stucco cladding, and a matching garage. This house was built from a pre-cut kit from Sears Roebuck called the Alhambra model.
- The Estella and W.E. Patterson house at 208 N. Johnson St. was built in 1932 in English Cottage style. As such, it sits rather low to the ground, with a massive fireplace and stone cladding. W.E. raced horses.

== See also ==
- National Register of Historic Places listings in Dane County, Wisconsin
