= Marquette Bungalows Historic District =

- U.S. National Register of Historic Places
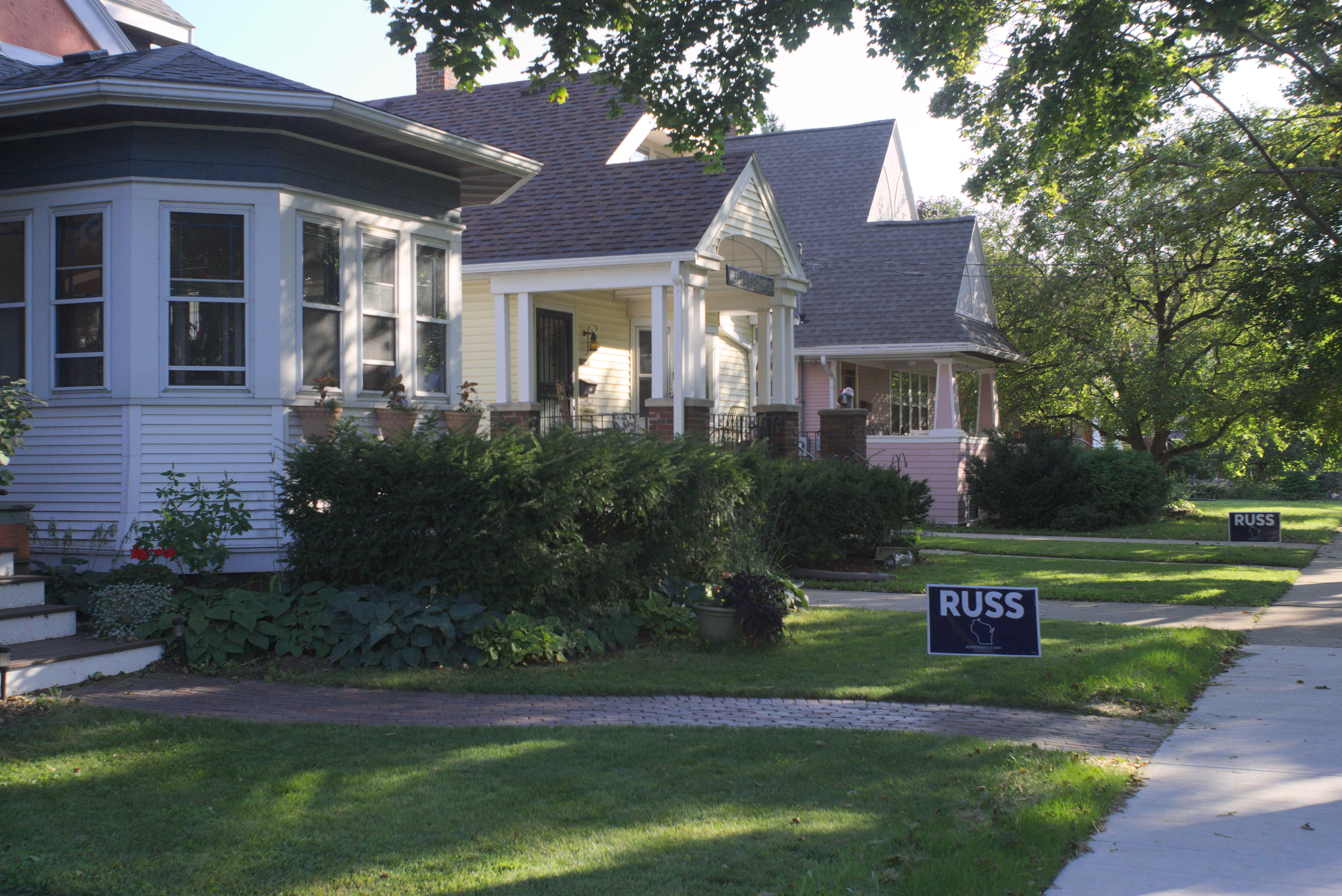
- Some of the houses within the district, September 2016
- Location: Bounded by South Thornton Avenue and Rutledge, South Dickinson, and Spaight streets Madison, Wisconsin; United States
- Area: 7 acres (2.8 ha)
- NRHP reference No.: 97000329
- Added to NRHP: April 14, 1997

The Marquette Bungalows Historic District is part of a neighborhood developed from 1924 to 1930 on the isthmus of Madison, Wisconsin, United States, holding the largest group of Craftsman-style bungalows in the city. In 1997 the district was added to the National Register of Historic Places.

"This district contains two blocks of bungalow-style homes in the Marquette neighborhood and is roughly bounded from Spaight St. to Rutledge St. and S. Dickinson St. to S. Thornton Ave. These bungalows sprouted up between 1924 and 1930 sharing similar shapes and sizes, although each home has certain details and features that make them unique. The size of these homes are not very large, but the quality of details and construction were superb. Many of these homes have wood flooring, fine woodworking throughout, built-in cabinets, and leaded glass windows. The Madison Landmarks Commission declared the Marquette Bungalows a historical district in 1993."

== History ==
The land that would become the Marquette Bungalows district was part of the 1836 plat of the Village of Madison, but it was far from the capitol square where most early development occurred, and it was marshy, lying along the Yahara River. No house was built there for fifty years, until George Soelch and James Rhodes moved a house to 629 South Dickinson from another location in 1887. It still stands there.

By the 1890s, blocks nearby were filling in with houses, but this still-marshy area did not. When the Yahara River Parkway was created just to the east from 1903 to 1906, the river was straightened and the area became easier to drain. Finally in 1924, the owners of the land, Charles Mueller and Catharina and John Jepertinger, formed a company with carpenter and contractor Nicholas Karrels to develop the land. The company was called Karrels Realty and Building Development Company. They replatted the two blocks as Soelch's Subdivision and Karrels proceeded to build homes there. In 1930 the last lot was filled.

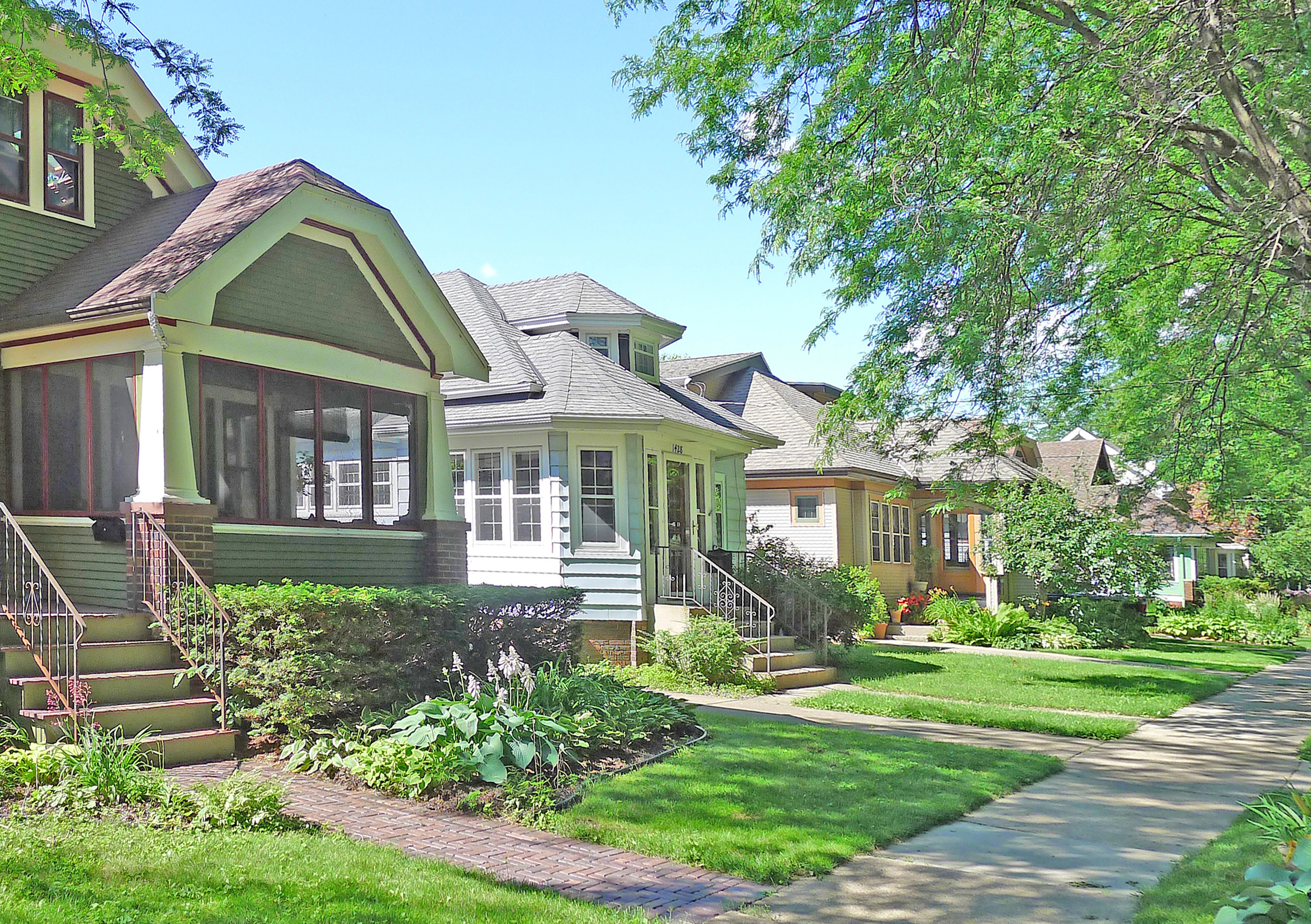
After 100 years, many Craftsman-style exposed rafter tails are now hidden by rain gutter and soffit, and porches have been enclosed, but the tapered square columns are still visible.

Nearly all the homes constructed by Karrels were structurally bungalows. That term can mean many things, but in this neighborhood in the 1920s bungalow meant a 1.5-story modest home, with most living space downstairs in a rather open plan, and some living space upstairs within a low-pitched roof expanded by dormers, and often with a large porch to one side out front. This layout was seen as convenient and efficient. 45 of the 47 contributing properties in the district today are bungalows.

All the homes constructed by Karrels were trimmed in Craftsman style. That style was popular for middle-class homes across the U.S. from about 1905 to 1930. Hallmarks are exposed rafter tails, broad eaves often supported on the ends by knee braces, and large porches supported by tapered square columns. Craftsman style was developed by the Greene brothers in California, influenced by the English Arts and Crafts movement. It was seen as a modern style at the time, not copying old European architecture like the Italianate and Queen Anne styles that preceded it.

The district was declared a historic district by the Madison Landmarks Commission in 1993 and was added to the National Register of Historic Places April 14, 1997.

== Some example houses ==
- The Dewey house at 1424 Rutledge St is a 1.5-story bungalow built in 1924 with jerkinhead gables and dormers, with the gable ends covered with shingles, with oriel windows, and with a front porch supported by tapered brick columns.
- The Russos' house at 1438 Rutledge St is a 1.5 story bungalow built in 1924, clad in stucco with half-timbering and an enclosed front porch. The first owners were Louis and Fannie Russos, who headed the Quality Confectionery Co. of 9 E. Main St., and later Arcadia Chocolate Shop. The house was later split into a two-unit home.

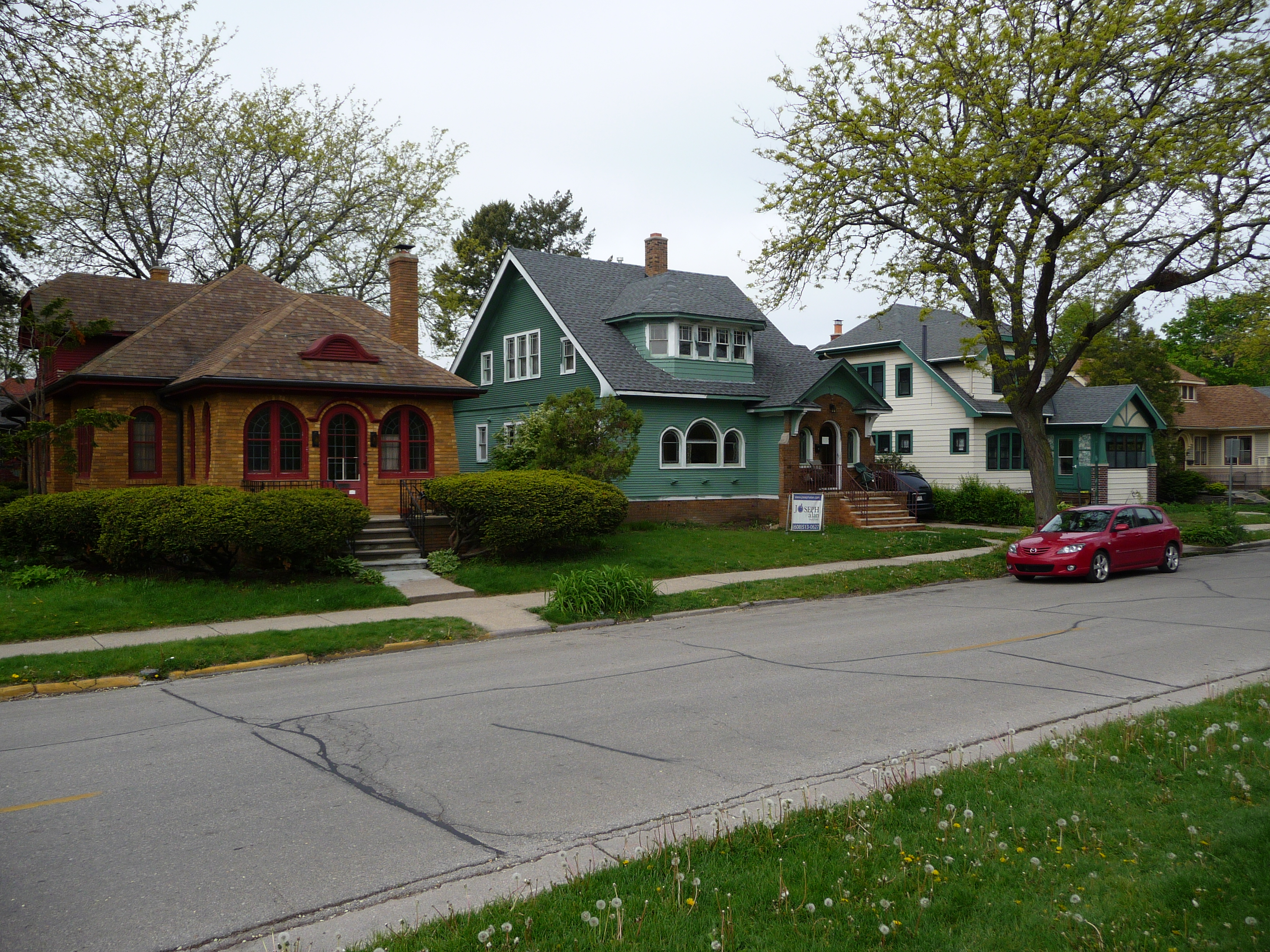
Holland house on left

- The Holland residence at 624 S Thornton Ave is a 1.5-story bungalow built in 1925. It has hip roofs with an eyebrow window above the porch, with round-topped windows and the walls veneered with brick.

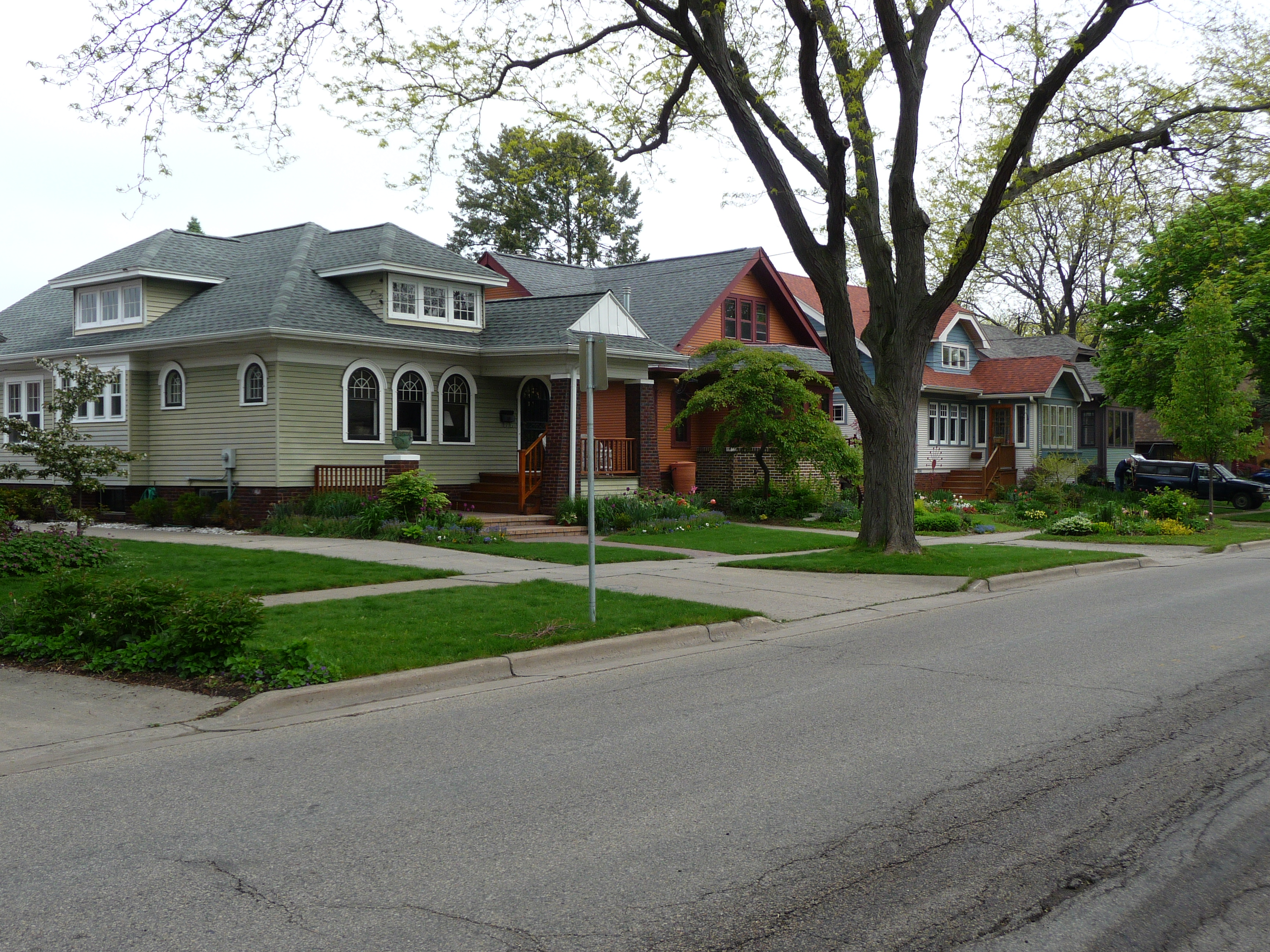
Hoven house on left

- The Hoven house at 1506 Rutledge St is a 1.5-story bungalow built in 1926, with a low-pitched roof, and a front porch supported by tapered square columns.
- The Lynch house at 1500 Rutledge St is another 1.5-story bungalow built in 1926, but different in that it is oriented diagonally on a corner lot, and it has a hip roof flared at the eaves above the porch and front wing.

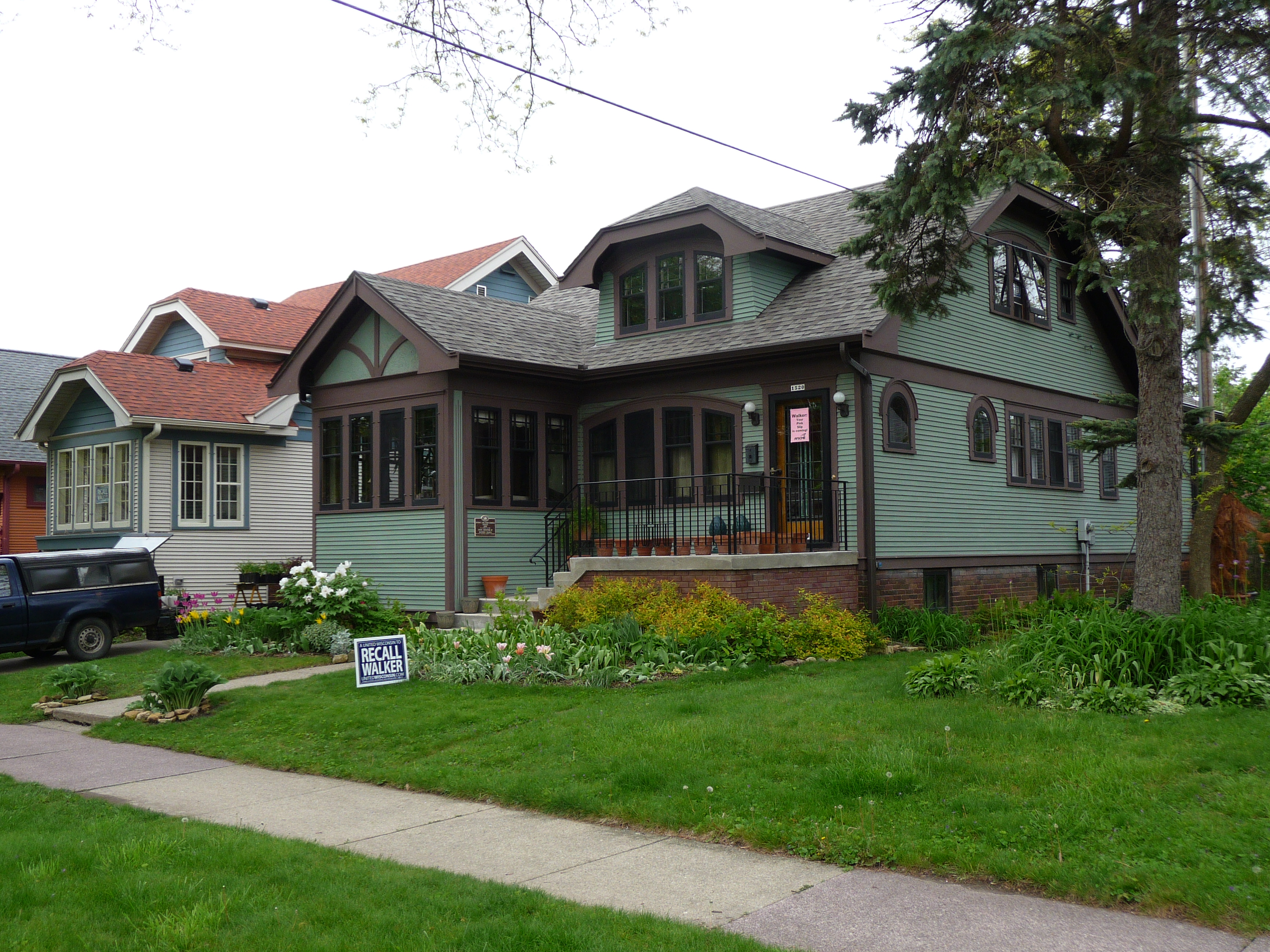
Kubicek house on right

- The Kubicek house at 1520 Rutledge St is another 1.5-story bungalow built in 1926, clad in clapboard, with jerkinheads on many gable ends, and with the front gable end stuccoed and half-timbered.
- The Karrels Co. Investment House at 1439 Spaight St is a 1.5-story bungalow built in 1927 - possibly a model home initially built to show what was possible. It has matching arch-topped openings in the front and an off-center front porch.
- The Hannes house at 1431 Spaight St is a 1.5-story bungalow built in 1927 - unusual for the Gothic-styled front porch and the 3-part window in the front gable end.
- The Bjelde Rental Duplex at 1509-1511 Spaight St is a 1.5-story duplex built in 1930, with first story clad in patterned brick with tapered corners trimmed with stone, a bay window to one side and a porch to the other. It was the last building constructed in the district.

== See also ==
- National Register of Historic Places listings in Madison, Wisconsin
