= Robert L. Hunt =

Robert Leroy “Bob” Hunt (June 3, 1933 – April 11, 2013) was a fisheries biologist. He grew up in McFarland, Wisconsin, on Lake Waubesa. He served in the US Army, then attended the University of Wisconsin-Madison, where he earned a bachelor's degree and a master's degree. He joined the Wisconsin Conservation Department in 1959. He did pioneering research on wild trout conservation, and led efforts to save streams from damage done by cattle operations and human activities. He won numerous national and international awards for his research and conservation work. He wrote the book "Trout Stream Therapy" in 1993. He served as president of the Wisconsin chapter of the American Fisheries Society in 1973. He studied troutstream rehabilitation project and developed a system for evaluating the results of a project. His work showed that altering the stream habitat by modifying the creek banks with more overhanging cover could triple the weight of trout in a stream over a six-year period.

He served on committees from the local level to the international level. Like his brother Dick Hunt, he was inducted into the Conservation Hall of Fame.
