= Lake Wingra =

Lake in Madison, Wisconsin

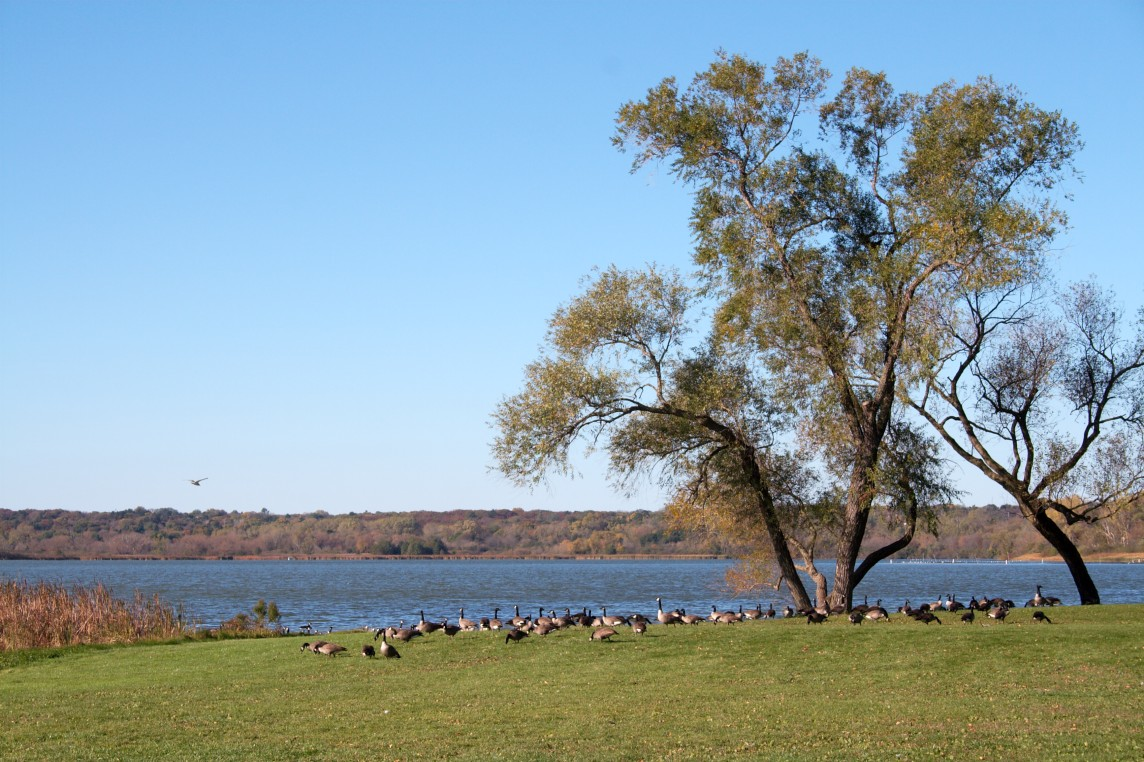

- Location within Wisconsin Location within the United States
- Location: Madison, Wisconsin
- Coordinates: 43°3′13″N 89°25′11″W
- Basin countries: United States
- Surface area: 1.3 km^{2} (1 sq mi)
- Average depth: 2.7 m (9 ft)
- Max. depth: 4.3 metres (14 ft)
- Water volume: 6,000,000 m^{3} (210,000,000 cu ft)
- Shore length^{1}: 5.9 km (4 mi)
- Frozen: about 120 days a year
- ^{1} Shore length is not a well-defined measure.

Lake Wingra is a small lake located inside the city limits of the U.S. city of Madison, Wisconsin. The smallest of the five major lakes drained by the Yahara River in Dane County, Lake Wingra is bordered by the University of Wisconsin–Madison Arboretum on the south and west and the City of Madison on the remaining shoreline. The lake is considered an important fishery and is known for spring runs of large muskellunge. Henry Vilas Zoo, Wingra Boats, Wingra Park, and Edgewood College are located on the Lake's northern shoreline. The majority of the shoreline is publicly owned.

== History ==
Historically, Native Americans made extensive use of the lands surrounding Lake Wingra, which takes its name from the word for "duck" in the Ho-Chunk language.

In the past, Lake Wingra was a very productive lake ecosystem with significant groundwater inputs. These inputs primarily took the form of surface springs and subsurface seepage, with drainage running through Wingra Creek to Lake Monona and the Yahara River, which is part of the Upper Rock River drainage, a tributary to the Mississippi River.

Over the past two hundred years, human use of the lake and its watershed have changed significantly. Only a fraction of the historical springs feeding the lake still remain and a much greater percentage of the lake's water budget comprises chemically, biologically and thermally polluted surface runoff. Lake Wingra, like other lakes in the Yahara chain (Mendota, Monona, Waubesa and Kegonsa), is severely stressed by a combination of toxic pollutants, such as mercury and PCBs, thermal pollution, sedimentation, exotic species (plant, animal and microbial), intense human recreational use and hyper-nutrification with nitrogen and phosphorus.

Stormwater management in the Lake Wingra basin was essentially ignored during the period of greatest development in the watershed. Storm drains ran directly to Lake Wingra and combined sewer issues resulted in discharges of zoo wastes into the Lake and Wingra Creek. This problem has been addressed successfully by the City of Madison. In other locations, stormwater is directed to holding and settling ponds which slow flows and trap pollutants before they move downstream to the lake itself. These ponds are contaminated with a variety of biological and chemical pollutants including polycyclic aromatic hydrocarbons (PAHs), heavy metals (e.g. Hg, Cd, Zn, Ni), and organic chemicals (phthalates, etc.). Restoration activities on the UW Arboretum will include removal of contaminated sediments from holding ponds which have not already been upgraded.

Efforts to restore Lake Wingra are taking place but so far, these have been small, mostly demonstration projects rather than a comprehensive basin-wide approach. The Wisconsin Department of Natural Resources is experimenting with removal of non-native carp in Lake Wingra during 2006/2007.

The USGS has a 2007 project (Project Number BQY31) located on the Edgewood College campus near the shore of Lake Wingra that tests the effectiveness of two rain gardens in containing water, with hopes this will lead to improved rain garden efficiency.

== See also ==
- Lake Kegonsa
- Lake Mendota
- Lake Monona
- Lake Waubesa
