= William Ellery Leonard House =

Historic house in Wisconsin, United States

- U.S. National Register of Historic Places
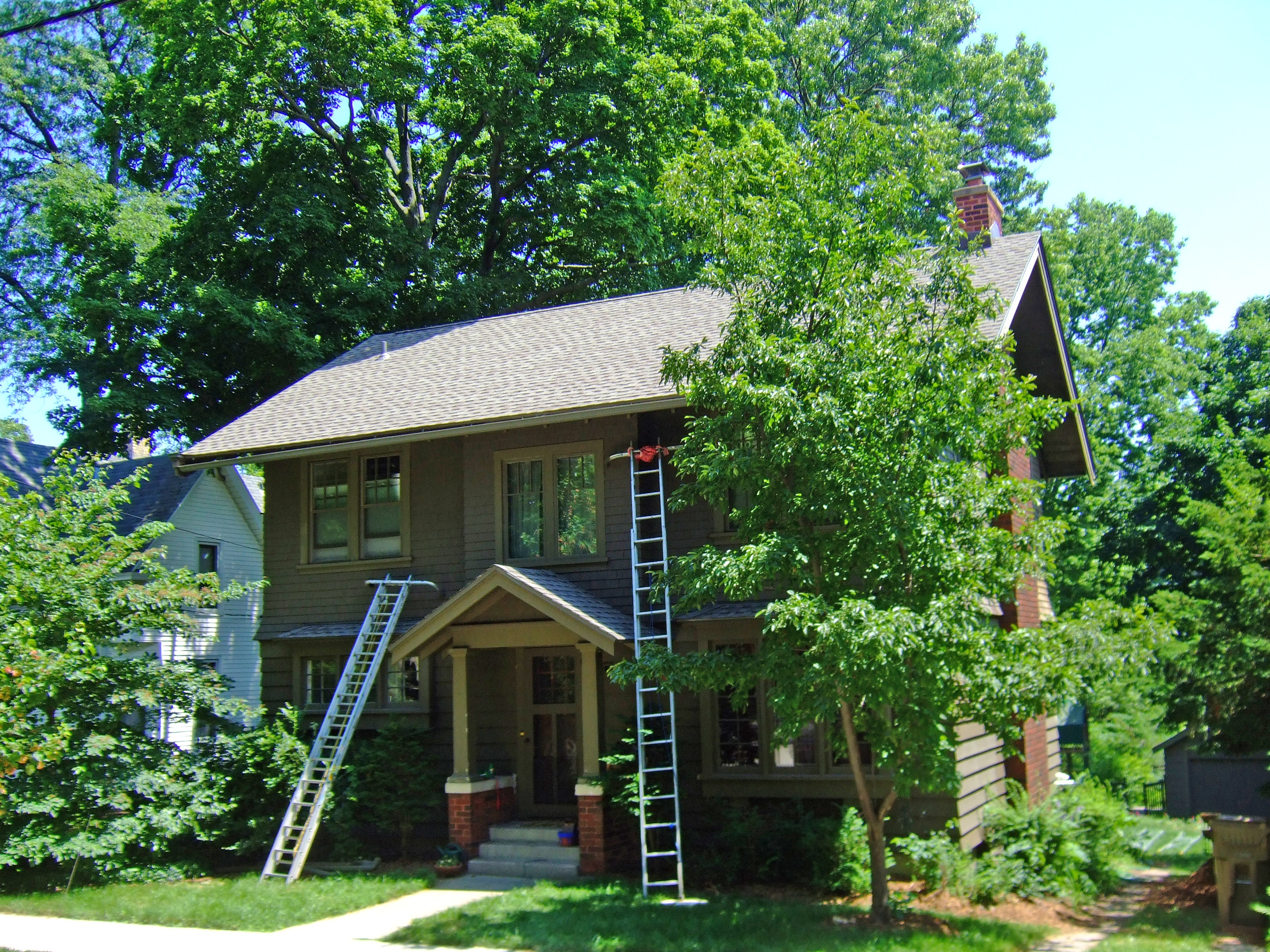
- William Ellery Leonard House
- Location: 2015 Adams St., Madison, Wisconsin
- Coordinates: 43°03′40″N 89°25′01″W
- Area: less than one acre
- Built: 1915
- Architect: Eugene Marks
- Architectural style: Bungalow/craftsman
- NRHP reference No.: 93000071
- Added to NRHP: February 25, 1993

The William Ellery Leonard House is a Craftsman-style house built in 1915 in Madison, Wisconsin for William and his second wife Charlotte. William was a poet and UW professor who suffered agoraphobia at times, and spent his most productive years in this house. In 1993 the house was added to the National Register of Historic Places.

== Background ==
William Ellery Leonard was born in New Jersey in 1876, the only child of a newspaper editor and a kindergarten teacher. He later wrote that at age two an encounter with a locomotive produced his fear of trains, and at age nine an incident with schoolyard bullies led to his reclusiveness, which grew into an intermittent fear of ranging far from his house. William's family had been well to do, but that fell apart during his childhood. They were not able to send him to college, but he received a scholarship to Boston University, then to Harvard where he studied under George Lyman Kittredge and William James. He studied at University of Göttingen in Germany, then earned a PhD at Columbia, writing his thesis on the influence of Byron on American literature. Despite the scholarships and successes, he suffered for his poverty all through school. Afterwards he worked in Philadelphia on material for an encyclopedia which was never published.

In 1906 he was hired as an instructor in the English department at the UW. He later wrote his impressions of that earlier Madison:

In September, 1906, I needed these quiet inland lakes and bluffs, these wooded shores, these long coulees and sunny oak-openings, and these west winds of Wisconsin as badly as any one who ever came.... But had I not needed them as a weary man, sick of nerves and spirit, my eye would still have drunk in the beauty of town and country-side with eager delight.... Almost from the first hours, Madison was to me the Peculiar City, a Capitol Dome on one hill, a University Dome on the other, and each Dome, as in no other city, mirrored in water.... Here was my ideal for the dwelling-place of modern man: an organic civilization in close touch with organic nature. A city far over whose roofs, twice a year, the wild geese fly. Why is not this the most famous city in our country, I thought. I will make it that, I thought. Longfellow's poem is but a conventional fancy, made to order in the studio. But let one live here, deeply and long, and he will write the poem that will give this city to America and the world. So I thought. And in the end so I tried to do.

He fell in love with his landlord's daughter too. In 1909 he and Charlotte Freeman married. By then a few of William's works were already published: his Sonnets and Poems in 1906, a translation The Fragments of Empedocles in 1908, and The Poet of Galilee in 1909. The marriage ended when Freeman killed herself in 1911. Her family and some of Madison society blamed Leonard, and he had a nervous breakdown, retreating to a cottage at the edge of campus where his parents came to look after him.

In 1912 he had recovered enough that he began to teach again, and to work on writing projects to "ward off seizures of grief, of indignation, or of terror." He also "became physically unable to move more than a few hundred yards from home." He moved from his apartment on Park Street to a "roomier, sunnier" one at 433 North Murray Street, close enough to Bascom Hill to teach there.

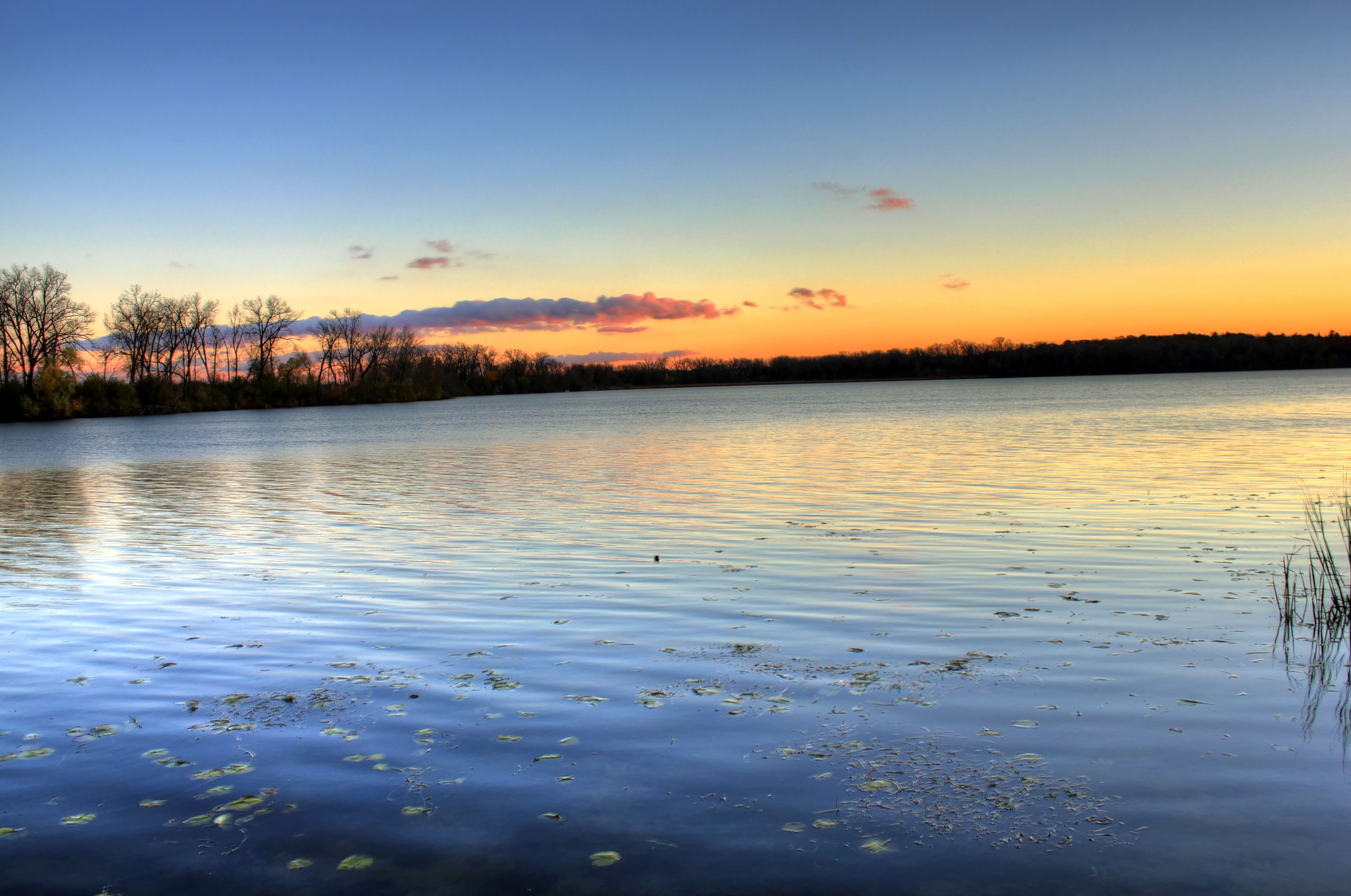
Lake Wingra, one of William and Charlotte's haunts

By 1914 he had fallen in love again, with Charlotte Charlton. This change allowed him to range farther from home and his parents were able to leave. He and Charlotte married and began planning the house at 2015 Adams, which seems to have been on a lot that Charlotte already owned. This area a mile southwest of campus near Lake Wingra was then at the edge of Madison, in a new subdivision.

== House description ==
The house that William and Charlotte built is two stories with a t-shaped footprint on a concrete foundation, in the Craftsman style that was popular around 1915. It was designed by Eugene Marks with input from Leonard. Hallmarks of Craftsman style in this house are the exposed rafter tails, the wide eaves, and the rather simple design which highlights the beauty of the materials rather than machine-made ornament. Outside, the first story is clad in cypress weatherboard and the second story in cedar shingles with the lowest course of shingles flared - both stained dark brown. Bargeboards on the gable ends consist of three lapped boards, which turn horizontal at the rain gutters. Shallow rectangular bay windows flank the front entry, supported by beam ends. A gable-roofed porch shelters the front door, supported by square wood columns on brick piers.

Inside, the front door opens to a small "air lock," which leads to a front hall. The first floor is trimmed in oak, with a living room fireplace of wire-cut brick, a dining room with a plate rail, and a kitchen. French doors from the dining room open into an unheated sun porch. From the kitchen and entry hall, an oak staircase leads up to the second floor, with three bedrooms and William's study, with another fireplace. Doors from William's study and Charlotte's bedroom lead to a sleeping porch above the sun porch.

== Life in the house, and after ==
William later wrote of building the house in his autobiography The Locomotive God:

We had built a simple cottage overlooking Lake Wingra and its woods, ... We feared it was rather far out from town and my work; but the scene out there was so lovely, so quiet, and our best friends had their flowery homes out there. And we felt too that it might be an incentive... that I might 'reeducate' myself once for all by accustoming myself to a home... out there. While it was a-building, we could ride over on our bicycles... every day... or twice a day... in July, stakes along the green earth cleared of brush... a brown square home... the shape of a house already... we could see where the kitchen and the study were to be... talks with the kindly contractor on the precise brick for chimney and for fireplace... by October, twilights on the sun-parlor seat, as yet without paint, amid the sawdust and shavings with the same pine-smell I had loved in boyhood's carpenter-shop. We were really living there long before we moved in. Early the next spring I graded the lawn with my own arms and back; and planted... a year after... new trees and shrubs. A poplar... a tamarack... a pine... a cedar... a mountain ash... elms on the tree-lawn... the glad gifts from the private nursery of next-door neighbor, a suburban Thoreau. Wild honeysuckle bushes from my foragings in near-by thickets... flower-garden of larkspur and hollyhock and all the names of blue and gold and scarlet....

Meantime my wife created all the indoors... The curtains in the dining-room were pale yellow... in her bedroom, blue... in my study brown to match the built-in bookcases... we sat behind the woodbine vines of the sun-parlor in hot moonlights... and we had when the time came a woodfire in the living-room grate, or the study's. Neither of us ever cared for property: but a home, owned and paid for, and a curtained window from which two can watch... spring after spring... especially for two who have been sore beset...

Things were better for some years in the house with his new wife. William finished Two Lives, a poem in which he wrestles with his first marriage. He taught and was promoted to associate professor. One of his students described his teaching in a survey of modern poetry:

At the University of Wisconsin, Leonard's presence, his tall gray-clad figure with its shock of white hair, and his loosely knotted 'Windsor' bow tie, whose Bohemian, almost Byronic, negligence was an attractive contrast to the formal, if decidedly unpedantic, manner of his speech and appearance, created an 'atmosphere' to all undergraduates who were interested in poetry. It is doubtful if any University lecturer of his day... excelled him in the teaching of comparative literature. Those students who survived the severe discipline of his seemingly innocent course in Anglo-Saxon, which included comparative studies of Greek, Hebrew, Sanskrit, Latin and Icelandic literatures as well... emerged with a renewed respect for the power of language and its relationship to poetry. ... The course was ill-attended, for it demanded an almost selfless devotion to poetry and a Puritan toughness of fiber to withstand Leonard's oral examinations... To the Middle West, Leonard brought his associations of a New England heritage, which included a Protestant-Abolitionist spirit that had turned against itself in violent self-criticism of its despised 'Puritanism and prudery'...

At the house on Adams Street he wrote his Poems 1914-1916, The Lynching Bee, a verse translation of Beowulf, his autobiographical The Locomotive God, and other works. He was better, but still not able to travel far. This is the start of a poem that describes the couple's attachment to the house in that period:

The Wife
Ten years you've sat (within the room you wrought)
To guard me from the Fear
Except for hurried trip (when I was out)
Down town... and near, quite near.

Ten years you've sat, except for stolen walk
(With scribbled note on shelf),
By lake-side lane or neighbor's hollyhock,
Anxiously, by yourself.

Ten years together we have hugged our home
Because of this fierce Fear,
And made our prison-close a world to roam, ...

In 1925 an incident on a summer hike triggered a downward spiral. William became less able to travel and he and Charlotte ended up leaving the house they had built to return to the apartment at 433 North Murray Street, closer to his classes. He wrote:

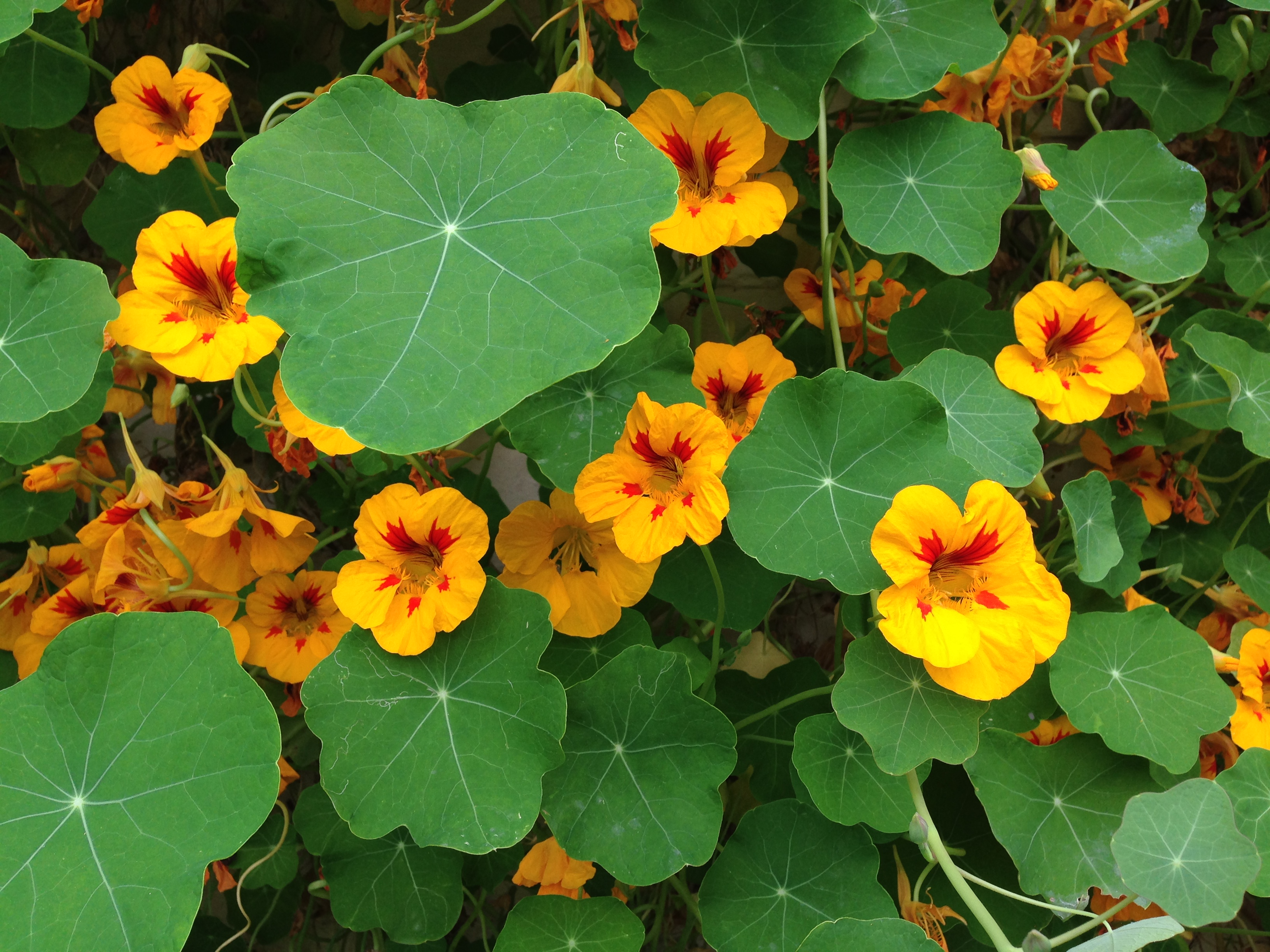

The phobic suffering and the grotesque bustle took our minds off the grief of leaving. We brought with us everything except my boat, my garden-tools, my boxing gloves, and . . . the cat. Our apartment is now famous for the sun through the Murray Street elmtops... I raise a few marigolds, zinnias, calendulas, poppies and nasturtiums in the back yard..."

William managed to continue teaching. When he couldn't get to the classroom, he held classes in his home or in the library. Eventually William fell in love with one of his students, Grace Golden. Charlotte divorced him in 1934. William married Grace in 1935 and she divorced him two years later. Charlotte remarried, but her new husband died by suicide in her house on Adams Street. William and Charlotte remarried in 1940 and took care of each other at the sunny apartment on Murray Street until he died in 1944.

UW philosophy professor Albert Gustav Ramsperger and his wife Peggy moved into the house on Adams Street in 1938, bought it from Charlotte Leonard in 1944, and lived there until 1992, raising their family in it. Peggy had been a grad student of William Leonard. The Ramspergers made only minor updates to the house.

Ernest Meyer wrote of that last phase of Leonard's life, in the apartment on Murray Street:

His comings and goings are confined to a beaten track in an area no larger than Battery Park. But his intelligence and creative vitality embrace the globe, penetrate thirty centuries, are at home in a dozen literatures and languages, and crack the walls of his prison to live in freedom with the free.
