= William Ellery Leonard =

American poet (1876–1944)

- Born: 25 January 1876; Plainfield, New Jersey
- Died: 2 May 1944 (aged 68); Madison, Wisconsin
- Education: Boston University; Harvard University; Columbia University
- Employer: University of Wisconsin

William Ellery Leonard (January 25, 1876, in Plainfield, New Jersey – May 2, 1944, in Madison, Wisconsin) was an American poet, playwright, translator, and literary scholar.

== Early life ==
William Ellery Channing Leonard was born on the family homestead in Plainfield, New Jersey on January 25, 1876. His parents, admirers of the transcendentalist movement, named him after William Ellery Channing, a mentor to Ralph Waldo Emerson. His father, William James Leonard, was a newspaper editor. However, by 1890, he was unable to financially support his family with this profession. Three years later, he returned to ministry. He accepted an appointment with a Unitarian church in Bolton's Landing, Massachusetts and moved the family there. He joined Phineas Quimby's New Thought movement and left the Unitarian church in 1898. Leonard's mother, Mattie, was a proponent of the pseudoscientific study of graphology and taught kindergarten. Leonard attended his mother's class for five years, studied with his father at home, and did not enter public school until he was nine.

During his adolescence, Leonard gained an appreciation for literature. Frustrated that his impoverished parents could not afford college, Leonard took a job out of high school as a door-to-door salesman. On a day off, he took a trip to Boston to visit the Massachusetts Genealogical Society. However, his guidebook had the wrong address and Leonard instead wound up at the College of Liberal Arts at Boston University. A clerk invited Leonard to speak with the dean of the school, who offered Leonard a tuition scholarship. Leonard wrote over 200 poems while in school, and his "Parson Moody's Prayer" was published in The Century Magazine in 1899. He was also the editor of the university biweekly newspaper, the University Beacon.

Leonard received his B.A. from Boston University in 1898. Harvard University, impressed with Leonard's undergraduate achievements, offered to allow Leonard to study there for a master's degree in one year, instead of the customary two. While studying there, Leonard was offered a temporary position to replace a professor of Latin at Boston University. After graduating from Harvard and completing his temporary professorship, Leonard took a job in a small high school in Plainville, Massachusetts. Leonard was awarded with a postgraduate fellowship from Boston University that allowed him to study in a foreign university. He spent two years in Germany on the scholarship. Leonard engaged in graduate studies at both the University of Bonn and Göttingen University, and earned his Ph.D. from Columbia in 1904. His dissertation was on the influence of Lord Byron on the American poetry movement from 1815 to 1860.

== Career ==
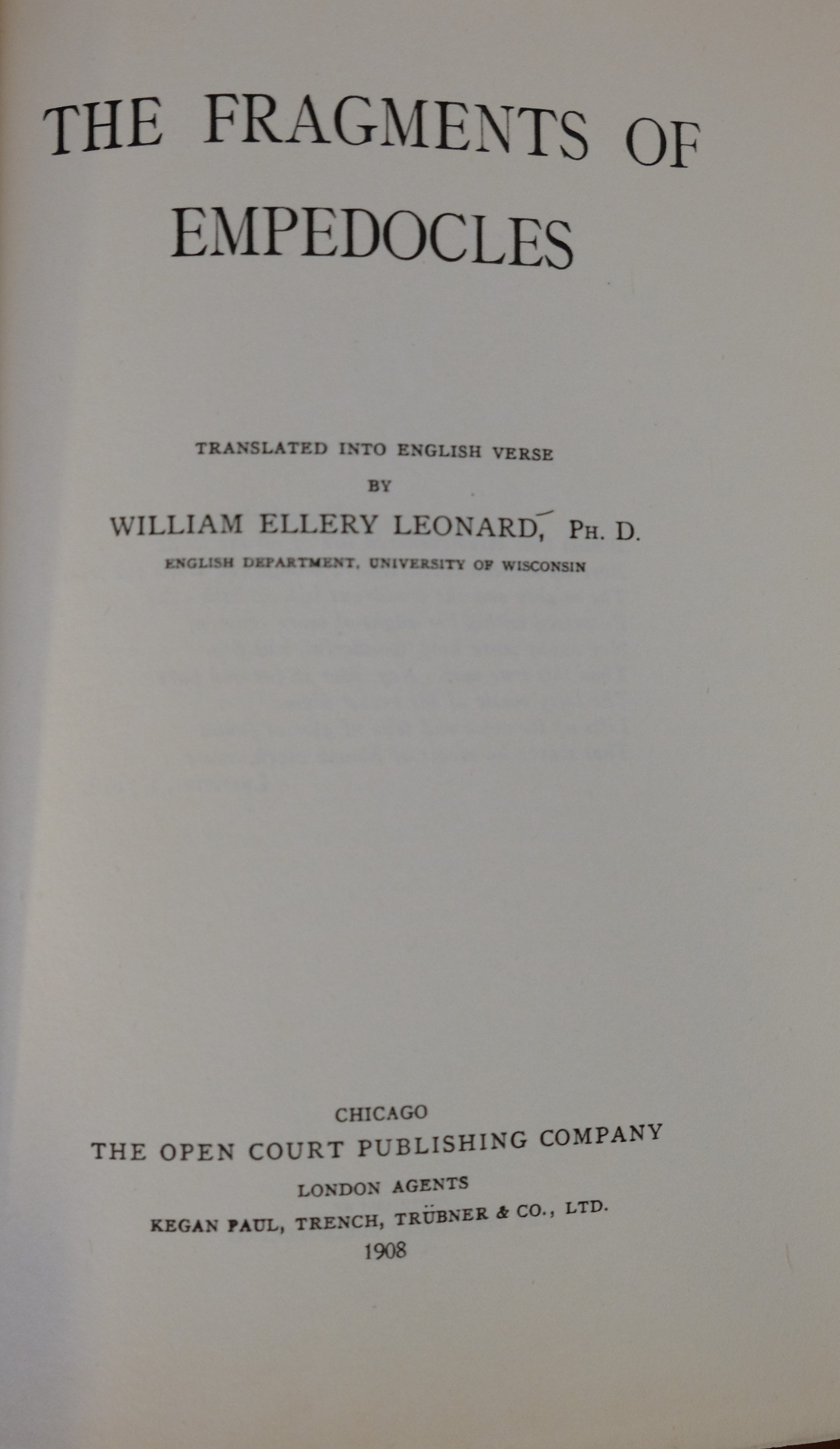
Title page to a 1908 copy of "The Fragments of Empedocles," translated by Leonard

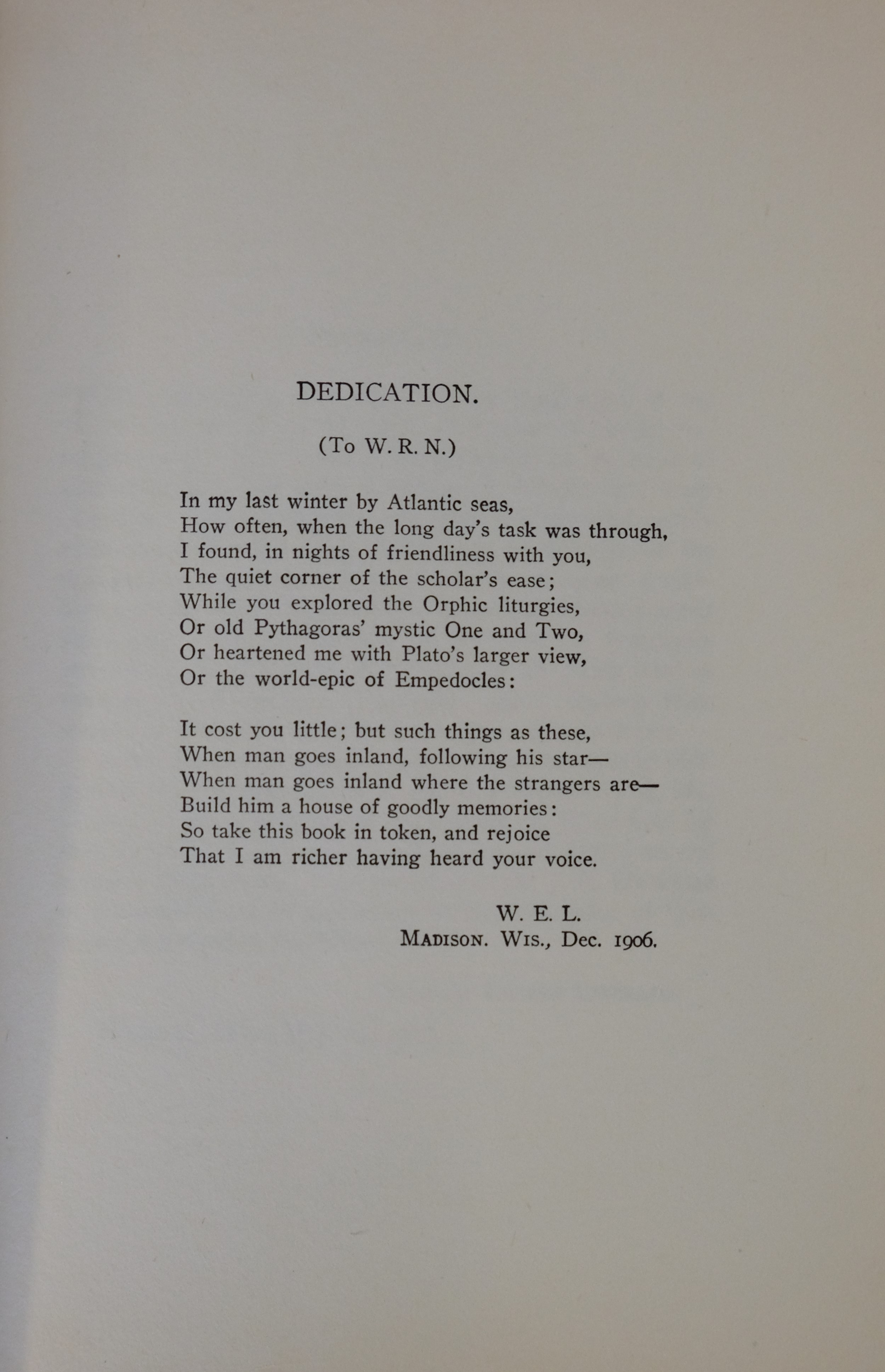
Dedication page in a 1908 copy of "The Fragments of Empedocles," translated by Leonard. Leonard dedicated the work to friend and colleague William Romaine Newbold

In 1906, Leonard accepted a position as assistant professor of English at the University of Wisconsin. He was recruited by Charles R. Van Hise, whose Wisconsin Idea dictated that research would be a cornerstone of the university. He befriended graduate student Leonard Bloomfield, with whom he would maintain a lifelong friendship. Leonard published his first book of poems as Sonnets and Poems to little fanfare in 1906. Among his prominent students at Wisconsin were literary critic Leslie Fiedler, activist Carl Haessler, poet Marya Zaturenska, activist Mildred Harnack, and poet Clara Leiser, the latter two outspoken opponents of Nazism.

Over his career Leonard wrote numerous volumes of poetry, the first of which was Sonnets and Poems, a collection regarded as showing emotional intensity as well as psychological depth. He is most remembered, however, for Two Lives, a cycle of 250 sonnets telling the story of his tragic marriage. Stephen Vincent Benét called it the best American poem of the twentieth century. In his psychological autobiography, The Locomotive-God, he probed his agoraphobia. Leonard is also known for his many scholarly works, particularly translations of Aesop, Empedocles, and Lucretius (e.g. De rerum natura) as well as the epic Beowulf.

== Personal life ==
Leonard suffered from lifelong agoraphobia, which not only kept him confined to the area of his home and university campus but increased with age to the point that, in the last years of his life, he conducted all lectures from his home. He married Charlotte Freeman, the daughter of his landlord, in 1909. The marriage was short-lived, however; she committed suicide on May 4, 1910. From 1914 until their divorce in 1934, he was married to Charlotte Charlton. In 1935, he married a student, Grace Golden, who divorced him two years later. Three years after that, he remarried his second wife.

Leonard died of a heart attack in Madison, Wisconsin on May 2, 1944. A newspaper commented that his death had freed him "from the phobic prison he had occupied for years."

== Legacy ==
Today the William Ellery Leonard House is on the list of Registered Historic Places in Madison, Wisconsin.

== Works ==
- Byron and Byronism in America (1905—Columbia University dissertation)
- Sonnets and Poems (1906)
- The Fragments of Empedocles (1908)
- Aesop and Hyssop (1912)
- The Vaunt of Man (1912)
- Leonard, William Ellery (1915). Socrates, Master of Life. Archived from the original on October 15, 2012 – via Questia.
- "Bryant and the Minor Poets," Book II, Chapter V of The Cambridge History of American Literature (1917–1921)
- The Lynching Bee (1920)
- Tutankhamen and After (1924)
- Two Lives (1925)
- The Locomotive-God (1927)
- Translation of Lucretius' Of the Nature of Things (1916)
- Beowulf: A New Verse Translation for Fireside and Class Room (1923)
- A Son of Earth Collected Poems (1928)
- Gilgamesh: Epic of Old Babylonia (1934)
- A Man Against Time (1945)
