= Helmar Lewis =

American politician (1900–1999)

Member of the Wisconsin Senate
- In office 1941–1944

Personal details
- Born: February 7, 1900 McFarland, Wisconsin, U.S.
- Died: March 6, 1999 (aged 99) Beloit, Wisconsin, U.S.
- Party: Republican
- Education: University of Wisconsin–Madison; University of Wisconsin Law School
- Occupation: Politician, lawyer

Military service
- Allegiance: United States
- Branch/service: United States Army
- Battles/wars: World War I

Helmar Lewis (February 7, 1900 – March 6, 1999) was an American politician and lawyer.

Born in McFarland, Wisconsin, Lewis was raised on a farm. He served in the United States Army during World War I. He received his bachelor's degree and law degrees from the University of Wisconsin–Madison. He served as District Attorney of Grant County, Wisconsin, city attorney and mayor of Boscobel, Wisconsin. He served in the Wisconsin Senate from 1941 to 1944 as a Republican, and resigned to work in the Office of Price Administration in June 1944. He then worked in the Wisconsin Public Service Commission as a lawyer. He died in Beloit, Wisconsin.
