= McFarland, Wisconsin =

- Village
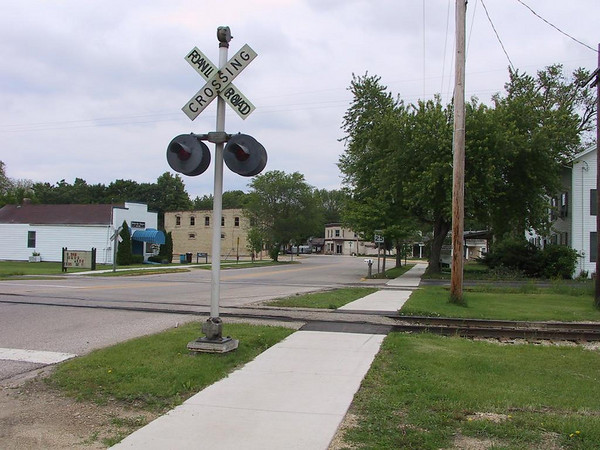
- Old railroad tracks in downtown McFarland

- Location of McFarland in Dane County, Wisconsin, with the Village of McFarland highlighted on the left map in red, updated to include the 2026 April Hills annexation.

- Location within Wisconsin Location within the United States
- Coordinates: 43°1′7″N 89°17′28″W
- Country: United States
- State: Wisconsin
- County: Dane

Government
  - Village President: Stephanie Brassington

Area
  - Total: 4.98 sq mi (12.91 km^{2})
  - Land: 5.0 sq mi (12.9 km^{2})
  - Water: 0.0077 sq mi (0.02 km^{2})
- Elevation: 869 ft (265 m)

Population (2026)
  - Total: 9,776
  - Estimate (2026) (Note: State estimate of 9,776 as of January 1, 2026, plus 386 residents of the April Hills subdivision annexed in November 2026.): 10,162
  - Density: 2,040/sq mi (788/km^{2})
- Time zone: UTC-6 (Central (CST))
  - Summer (DST): UTC-5 (CDT)
- Postal code: 53558
- Area code: 608
- FIPS code: 55-46850
- GNIS feature ID: 1569214
- Website: mcfarland.wi.us

McFarland is a village in Dane County, Wisconsin, United States, situated on Lake Waubesa. The population was 8,991 at the 2020 census, and the village's population surpassed 10,000 following a 2026 annexation. A suburb of Madison, it is part of the Madison metropolitan area, with U.S. Route 51 serving as the primary artery to Madison and Stoughton. The postal code is 53558.

== History ==
The Village of McFarland has several burial mounds from the Woodland period, collectively known as the Lewis Mound Group, located within Indian Mound Park.

Established in 1856 by William Hugh McFarland, the village's early industries included wheat and tobacco farming, ice and fish harvesting from the nearby Lake Waubesa for rail transportation to Chicago markets. A modest resort industry eventually emerged along the eastern shore of Lake Waubesa, featuring attractions such as Edwards Park and Larson's Beach. Following World War II, McFarland evolved into a residential community for Madison. In the late 1950s, the village annexed the newly-built petroleum tank farms to the north, bolstering its tax base and enabling the McFarland School District to finance a new high school. Commuting from McFarland became significantly more convenient in 1989 with the completion of a major highway project on the adjacent Madison Beltline, sparking rapid residential growth. In November 2026, the McFarland Village Board unanimously approved the annexation of the 80-acre April Hills subdivision from the Town of Blooming Grove. The addition of the subdivision's approximately 386 residents pushed the village's population over 10,000.

== Geography ==
McFarland is located at 43°1′7″N 89°17′28″W (43.018480, −89.291116).

According to the United States Census Bureau, the village has a total area of 3.55 square miles (9.19 km^{2}), all land. It is bordered by Lake Waubesa to the west and Mud Lake to the south.

== Demographics ==
Historical population
| Census | Pop. | Note | %± |
|---|---|---|---|
| 1880 | 168 | | — |
| 1890 | 166 | | −1.2% |
| 1930 | 313 | | — |
| 1940 | 463 | | 47.9% |
| 1950 | 593 | | 28.1% |
| 1960 | 1,272 | | 114.5% |
| 1970 | 2,386 | | 87.6% |
| 1980 | 3,783 | | 58.5% |
| 1990 | 5,232 | | 38.3% |
| 2000 | 6,416 | | 22.6% |
| 2010 | 7,808 | | 21.7% |
| 2020 | 8,991 | | 15.2% |
U.S. Decennial Census

It is the tenth-most populous place in Dane County.

=== 2010 census ===
As of the census of 2010, there were 7,808 people, 3,079 households, and 2,201 families residing in the village. The population density was 2,199.4 inhabitants per square mile (849.2/km^{2}). There were 3,200 housing units at an average density of 901.4 per square mile (348.0/km^{2}). The racial makeup of the village was 94.4% White, 1.2% African American, 0.4% Native American, 1.7% Asian, 0.1% Pacific Islander, 0.7% from other races, and 1.5% from two or more races. Hispanic or Latino of any race were 2.3% of the population.

There were 3,079 households, of which 38.8% had children under the age of 18 living with them, 56.9% were married couples living together, 10.1% had a female householder with no husband present, 4.4% had a male householder with no wife present, and 28.5% were non-families. Of all households, 21.9% were made up of individuals, and 7.8% had someone living alone who was 65 years of age or older. The average household size was 2.54 and the average family size was 2.96.

The median age in the village was 39.7 years. 26.9% of residents were under the age of 18; 5.6% were between the ages of 18 and 24; 26% were from 25 to 44; 31.2% were from 45 to 64; and 10.3% were 65 years of age or older. The gender makeup of the village was 49.0% male and 51.0% female.

== Arts and culture ==
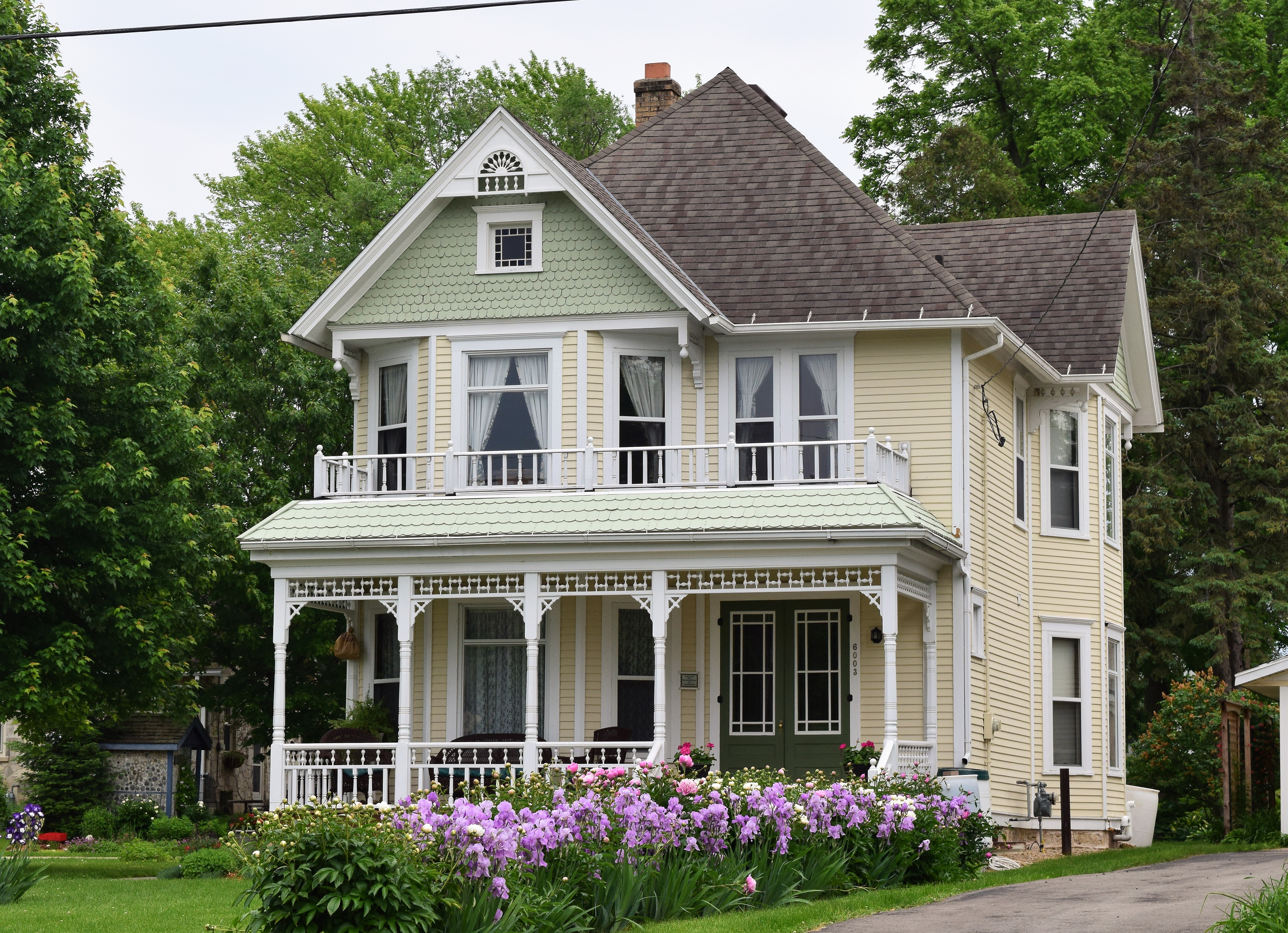
The Edwards-Larson House in McFarland is listed on the National Register of Historic Places.

The Edwards-Larson House is a restored Queen Anne-style Victorian home built in 1898 by E.N. Edwards. The home is open for tours on Sunday afternoons from 1 to 4 pm, Memorial Day to Labor Day. The McFarland Historical Museum is maintained by members of the McFarland Historical Society, which is dedicated to preserving and promoting the history and heritage of the Village of McFarland. Each Sunday from Memorial Day to September, the Museum and Log Cabin are open to the public from 1:00 p.m. to 4:00 p.m. The McFarland Community Ice Arena is operated by a private non-profit and hosts McFarland Youth Hockey, McFarland High School hockey, and a variety of other groups.

The McFarland Farmers' Market is held on Saturday mornings from May through October at the McFarland Village Center. The market features fresh produce, baked goods, crafts, and other items from local vendors. The village hosts a summer concert series in McDaniel Park, featuring live music from local and regional bands. Since 1985, McFarland has held a festival on the fourth weekend every September. The festival has carnival rides, train rides, a parade, and many competitions. In the first week of December, Winter Wonderland in the Village (formerly known as Christmas in the Village) takes place. Among the events are Open Houses, Scavenger Hunts, Carriage Rides, Santa visits, and a parade.

== Government ==
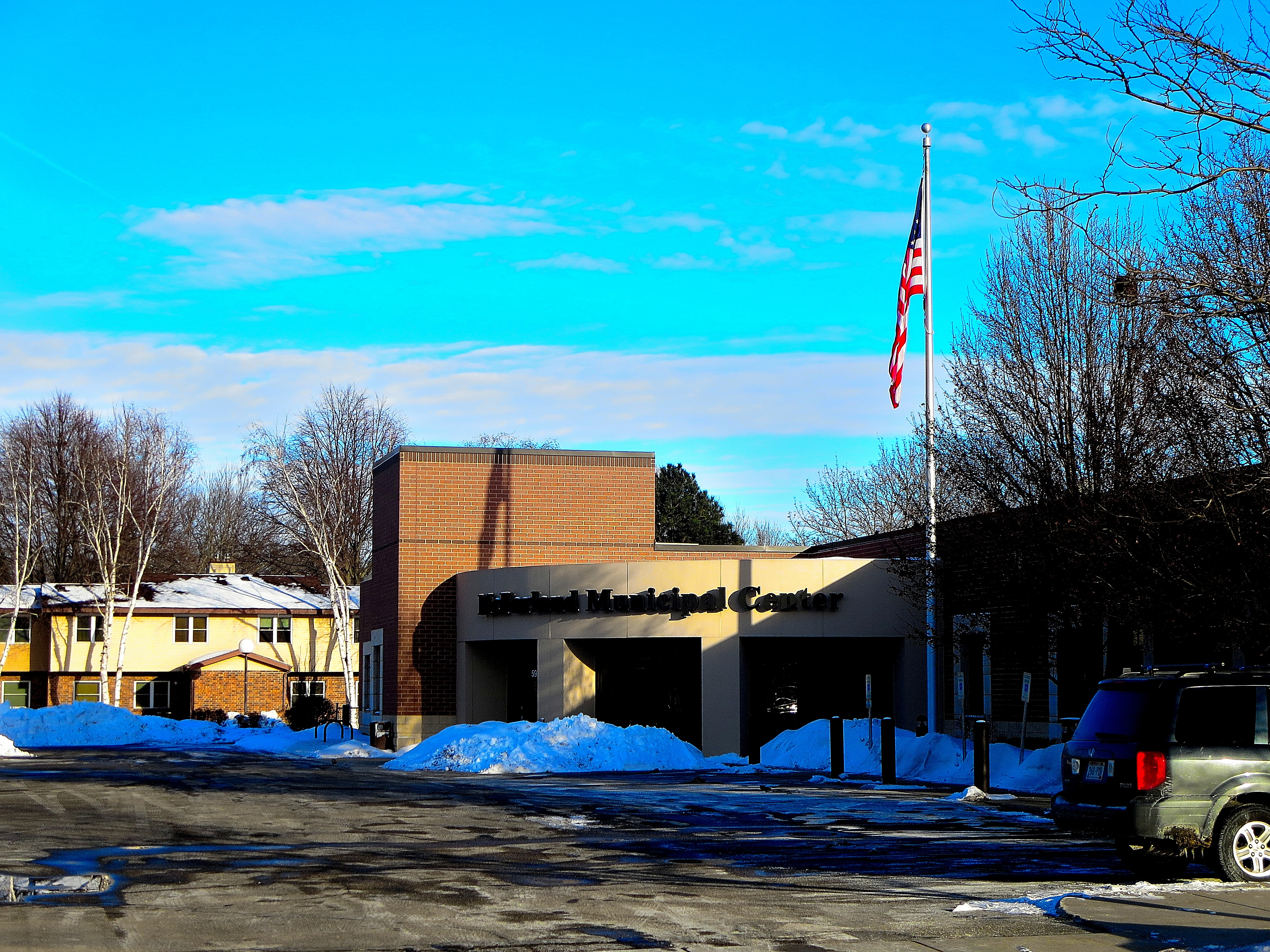
Village of McFarland Municipal Center

McFarland is governed by a village board consisting of a president and six trustees. The president and trustees are elected to two-year terms during spring elections. As of 2025, the village president of McFarland is Stephanie Brassington. McFarland has a full-time village administrator, who is responsible for the administration of the village government in accordance with the policies established by the village board. Other city officers consist of a village clerk, treasurer, municipal judge, police chief, and fire chief.

== Education ==
The McFarland School District serves the village of McFarland. It operates Conrad Elvehjem Early Learning Center (K), McFarland Primary School (grades 1–2), Waubesa Intermediate School (3–5), Indian Mound Middle School (6–8) and McFarland High School, which is accredited by the AdvancED commission. The McFarland School District has consistently scored above the state average on standardized tests. In addition, the district has received a number of accolades and awards for its educational programs and initiatives.

The E.D. Locke Public Library serves the village. It is part of the South Central Library System.

== Media ==
McFarland enjoys comprehensive media coverage from various Madison-based television, radio, print, and digital outlets. The community is kept informed through its local weekly newspaper, the McFarland Thistle. Additionally, McFarland residents have access to a local public-access television channel, WMCF.

== Infrastructure ==
=== Transportation ===
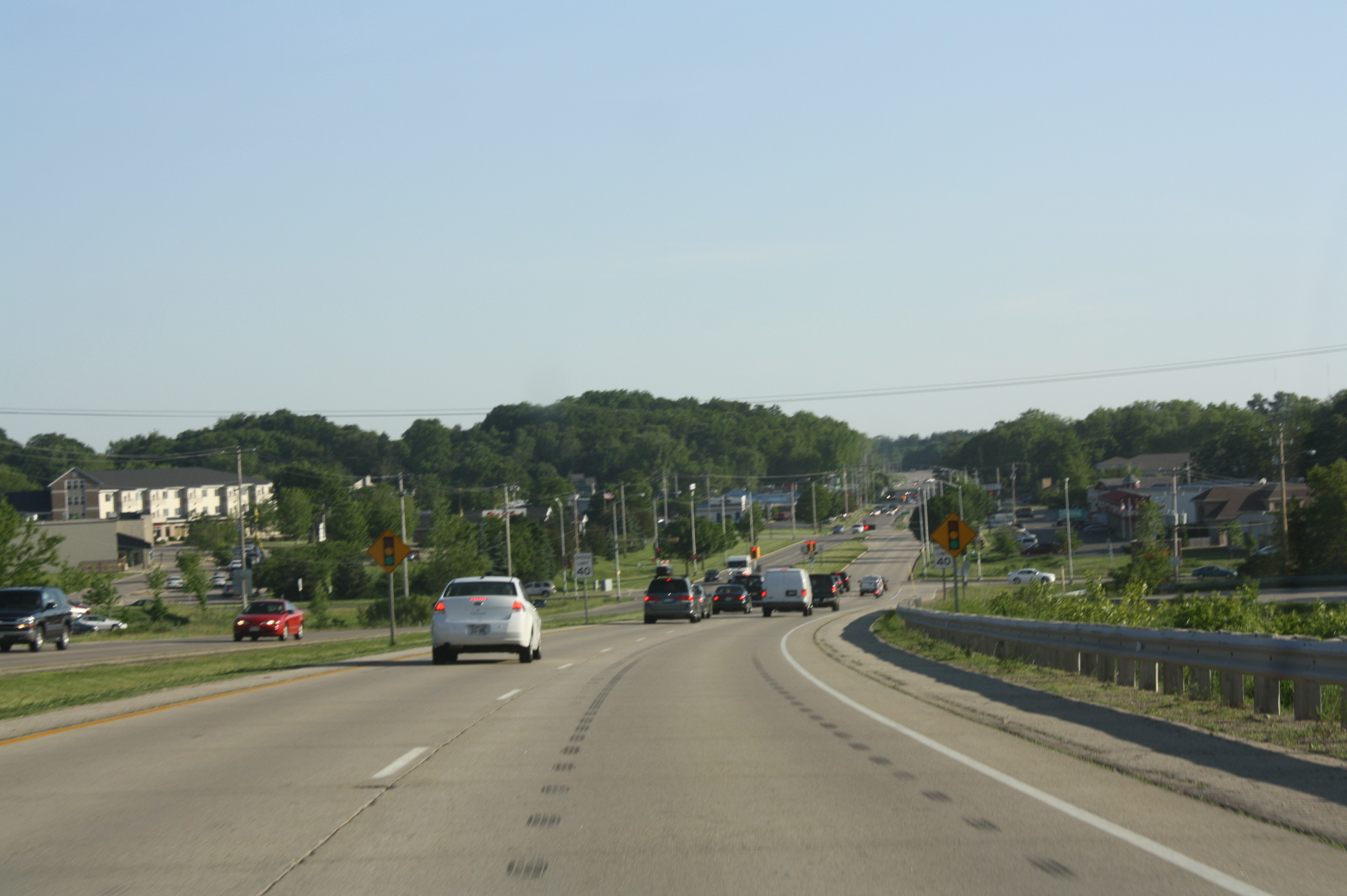
Panorama along U.S. Route 51

Located just south of U.S. Route 12, Madison's "Beltline Highway," McFarland is four minutes from Interstate 90, 12 minutes from the Wisconsin State Capitol, and 12 minutes from the University of Wisconsin.

McFarland is served by the Dane County Regional Airport, which is located 12 miles north of the village. McFarland is served by two taxicab companies (Union Taxi and Madison Taxi), as well as several companies that provide specialized transportation for persons with disabilities. Additionally, Uber and Lyft are available in McFarland.

The village is crossed by the Wisconsin and Southern Railroad line.

McFarland offers several biking trails, including the Lower Yahara River Trail. The approximately 2.5 miles of this trail link Madison to McFarland via an off-road trail system. Among its features is North America's longest inland boardwalk bridge.

The far northern end of the village is served by Madison Metro Transit Route L along Meinders Road, which connects Madison's Owl Creek neighborhood to the rest of the East Side of Madison.

=== Municipal services ===
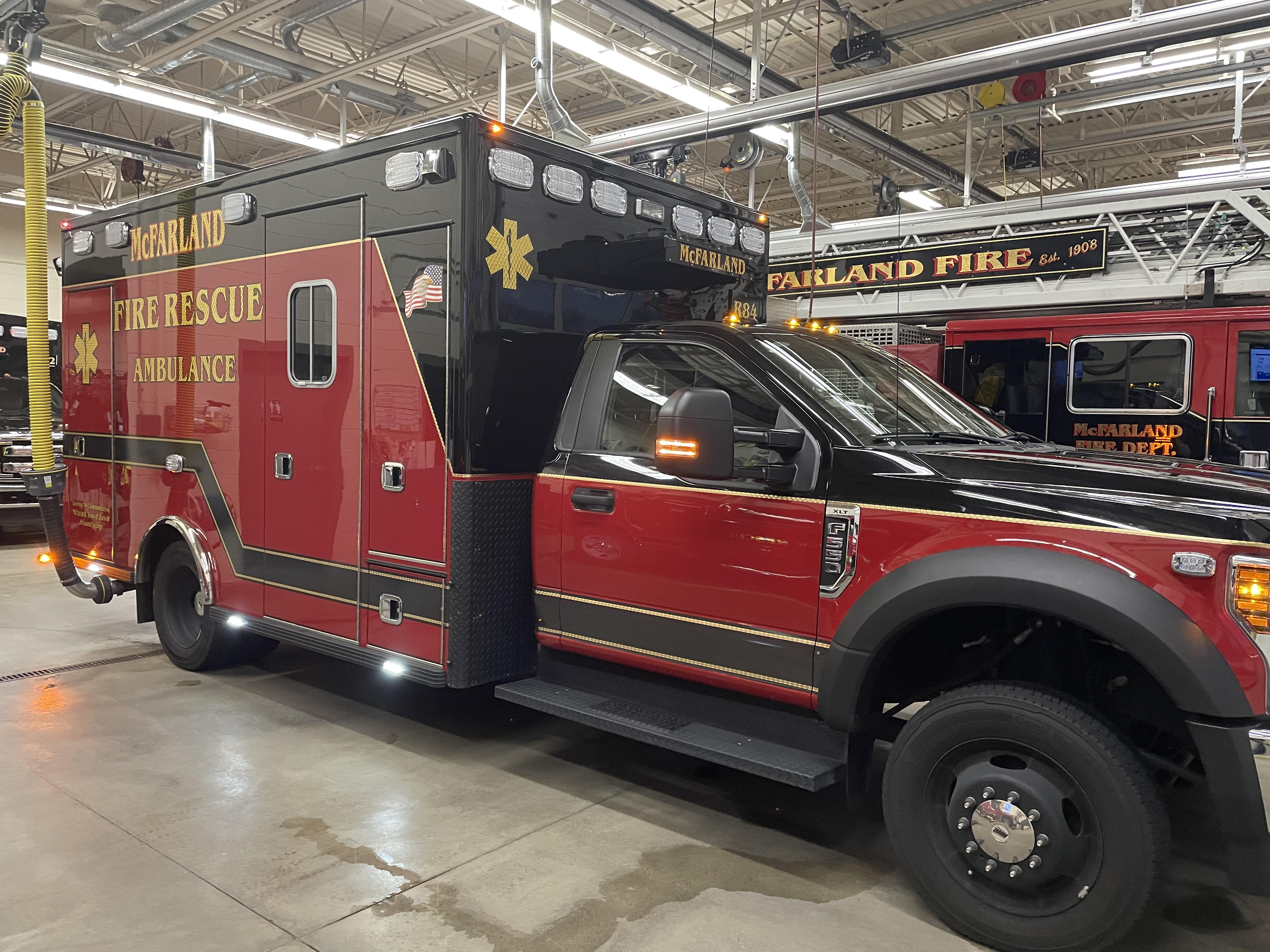
McFarland Fire Rescue provides fire, rescue, and EMS services to the Village of McFarland and surrounding communities.

McFarland's community fire department, known as McFarland Fire Rescue, serves an extensive region of 14 square miles, encompassing both the village and nearby towns. The department offers comprehensive firefighting and Paramedic services. Established in 1908, McFarland Fire Rescue relies on approximately 50 paid-on-call firefighters, EMTs, and officers. Full-time staffing includes a Fire & Rescue Chief, three administrative captains, seven firefighter/paramedics, and an administrative assistant.

The village has a full-service police department that provides law enforcement services 24 hours a day. The McFarland Police Department is staffed by a chief, lieutenant, 3 sergeants, detective, investigator, and 10 officers as well as 2 non-sworn administrative staff. The McFarland Police Department has an extensive outreach program, school resource officer, community service officer, and K-9 officer.

== Notable people ==
- Realf Ottesen Brandt, Lutheran minister
- Al Epperly, MLB player
- Conrad Elvehjem, biochemist
- Brad Fischer, adviser for the Pittsburgh Pirates
- Dominic Fumusa, actor
- Matt and Becca Hamilton, Olympic curlers
- Doris Hanson, Wisconsin politician
- Laëtitia Hollard, actress
- Robert L. Hunt, wildlife biologist and expert on trout
- Steve Lacy, 1980 and 1984 Olympic runner, University of Wisconsin Hall of Fame
- Helmar Lewis, Wisconsin State Senator
- Theodore G. Lewis, jurist
- Nina Roth, Olympic curler
- Jana Schneider, actress and journalist
- Barbara Thompson, Wisconsin Superintendent of Public Instruction
