= James Leonard House =

Historic house in Massachusetts, United States

- U.S. National Register of Historic Places
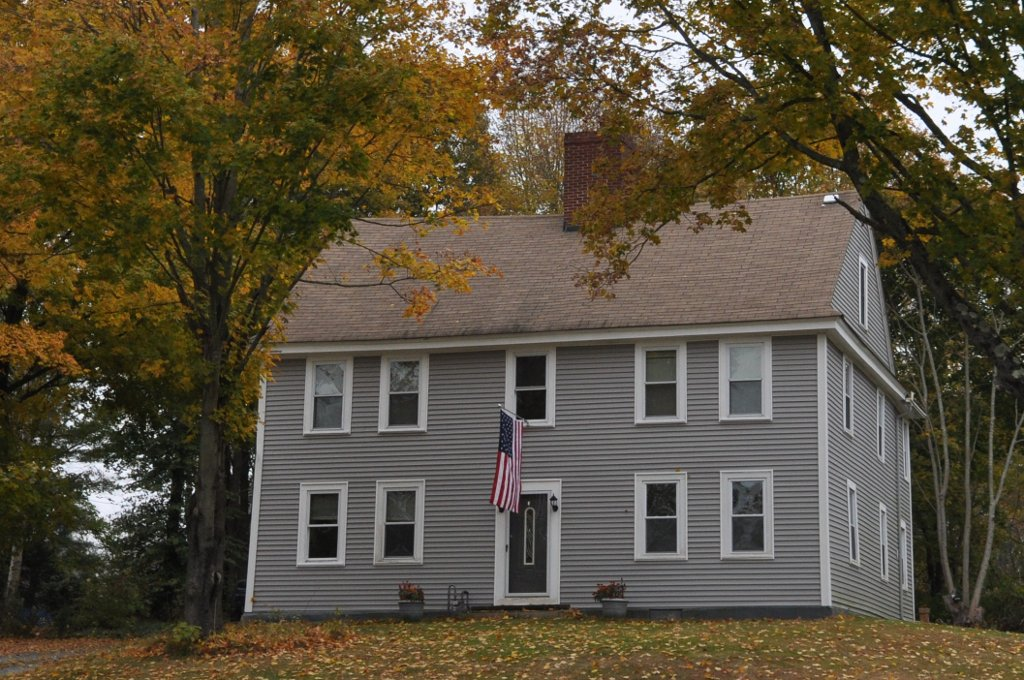

- Location within Massachusetts Location within the United States
- Location: Taunton, Massachusetts
- Coordinates: 41°54′51″N 71°6′28″W
- Built: c. 1752
- Architectural style: Colonial
- MPS: Taunton MRA
- NRHP reference No.: 84002152
- Added to NRHP: July 5, 1984

The James Leonard House is a historic house at 3 Warren Street in Taunton, Massachusetts. It is a 2 1/2-story wood-frame house, five bays wide, with a side-gable roof, large central chimney, and wood shingle siding. The doors and windows have simple trim, those on the second floor abutting the eave. The house was built circa 1752 for James Leonard, muster master for Bristol County. during the American Revolutionary War, and descendant of the James Leonard who established the Taunton Iron Works in 1652. The house is characteristic of large farmhouses built in the region during the 18th century, and is one of the oldest on Warren Street.

The house was added to the National Register of Historic Places in 1984.

== See also ==
- National Register of Historic Places listings in Taunton, Massachusetts
