= Capt. Charles Leonard House =

House in Agawam, Massachusetts, US

- U.S. National Register of Historic Places
- U.S. Historic district – Contributing property
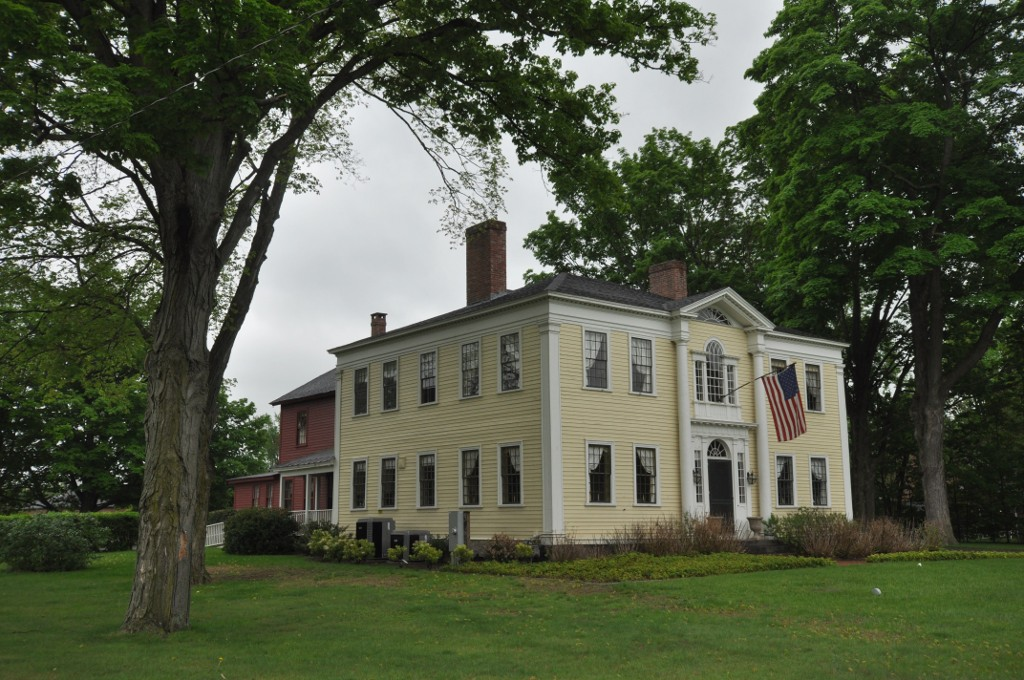

- Location within Massachusetts Location within the United States
- Location: Agawam, Massachusetts
- Coordinates: 42°4′14″N 72°36′53″W
- Area: less than one acre
- Built: 1805
- Architect: Asher Benjamin
- Part of: Agawam Center Historic District (ID01000670)
- NRHP reference No.: 75000273

Significant dates
- Added to NRHP: March 10, 1975
- Designated CP: June 21, 2001

The Capt. Charles Leonard House is a historic house at 663 Main Street in Agawam, Massachusetts. Built in 1805, it is described as Agawam's finest Federalist building, and is attributed to architect Asher Benjamin. It is now owned by a local nonprofit organization, which uses the house to stage community events. It is open for tours, and is available for rental. The house was listed on the National Register of Historic Places in 1975.

== Description and history ==
The Captain Charles Leonard House is located in the village center of Agawam, on the east side of Main Street (Massachusetts Route 159), between School and Albert Streets. It is a two-story wood-frame structure, with a hip roof, two interior brick chimneys, and a clapboarded exterior. Its corners have pilasters, which rise to an entablature and modillioned cornice. The main facade is five bays wide, with the center bay framed by two-story round columns, rising to a peaked gable. The main entrance is in the center bay, with flanking sidelight windows and a half-round transom window. On the second floor above there is a Palladian window. On the interior, it has a standard center hall with staircase, with public rooms in front and service rooms in back. A two-story wing extends to the north, and a single story wing extends further from that ell.

The house was built in 1805 for Captain Charles Leonard, a local militia leader who was known locally as "the farmer who went to Harvard." Leonard operated an inn on the premises until his death in 1814. By the early 20th century it had been converted into boarding house, and was in significantly deteriorated condition when it was purchased by a local preservationist in 1938. It has since been fully restored, and is now operated as a community center, local history museum, and event venue.

== See also ==
- National Register of Historic Places listings in Hampden County, Massachusetts
