= Clifford Milton Leonard Farm =

- U.S. National Register of Historic Places
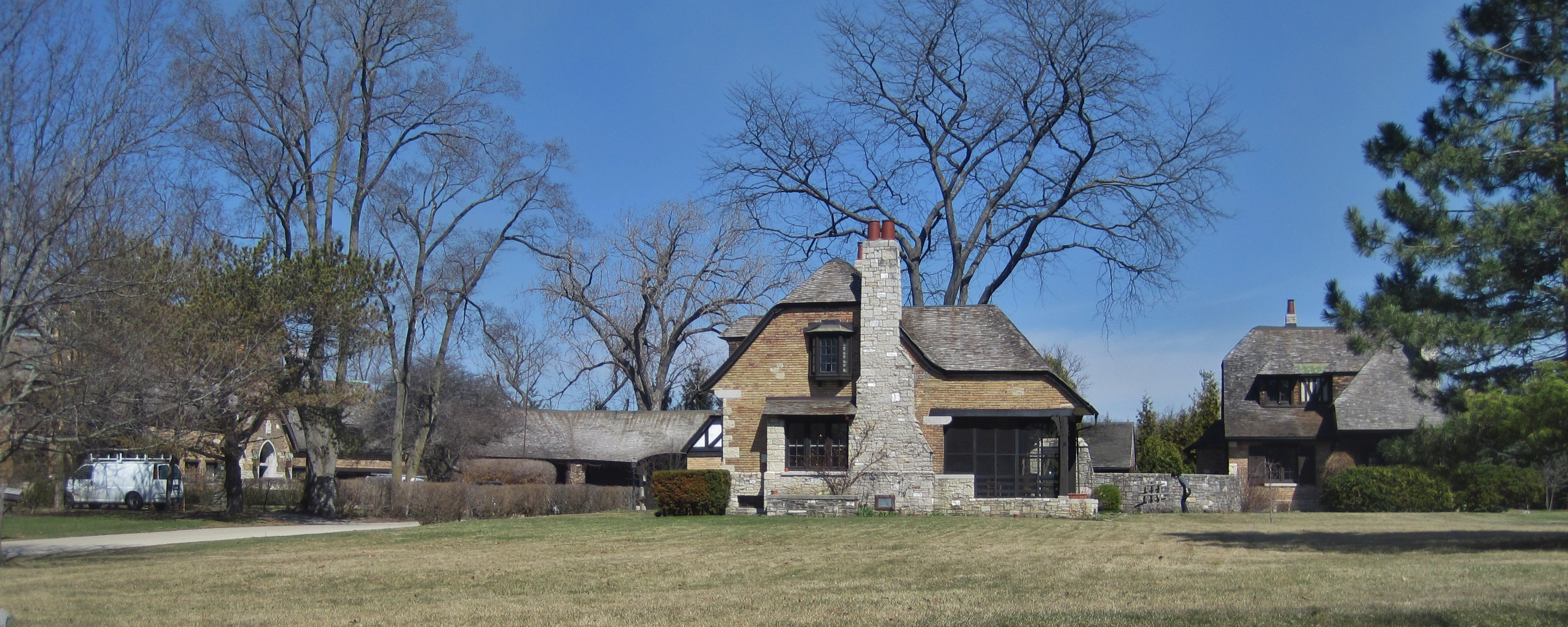

- Location within Chicago metropolitan area Location within Illinois Location within the United States
- Location: 550, 561, 565, 570, 575, 579 Hathaway Circle, Lake Forest, Illinois
- Coordinates: 42°14′59″N 87°52′29″W
- Area: 4.3 acres (1.7 ha)
- Built: 1923-26
- Architect: Ralph Varney, Jens Jensen
- Architectural style: French Renaissance Revival
- NRHP reference No.: 00000944
- Added to NRHP: August 10, 2000

The Clifford Milton Leonard Farm is a historic farm at 550-579 Hathaway Circle in Lake Forest, Illinois. The gentleman's farm was built in 1923-26 for Clifford Milton Leonard; at the time, gentleman's farms were a popular pastime for America's wealthiest citizens, and Leonard, the head of several oil and banking companies, was no exception to this rule. The property includes three cottages, a large round barn, a smaller carriage barn, and several outbuildings and smaller structures; while its original plans included a main house as well, it was never built. Architect Ralph Varney designed the buildings in the French Renaissance Revival style, using elements such as stone and brick exteriors, steep hip roofs, and flared eaves. Noted landscape architect Jens Jensen planned the farm's layout.

The farm was added to the National Register of Historic Places on August 10, 2000.
