= Lake Monona =

Lake in Dane County, Wisconsin

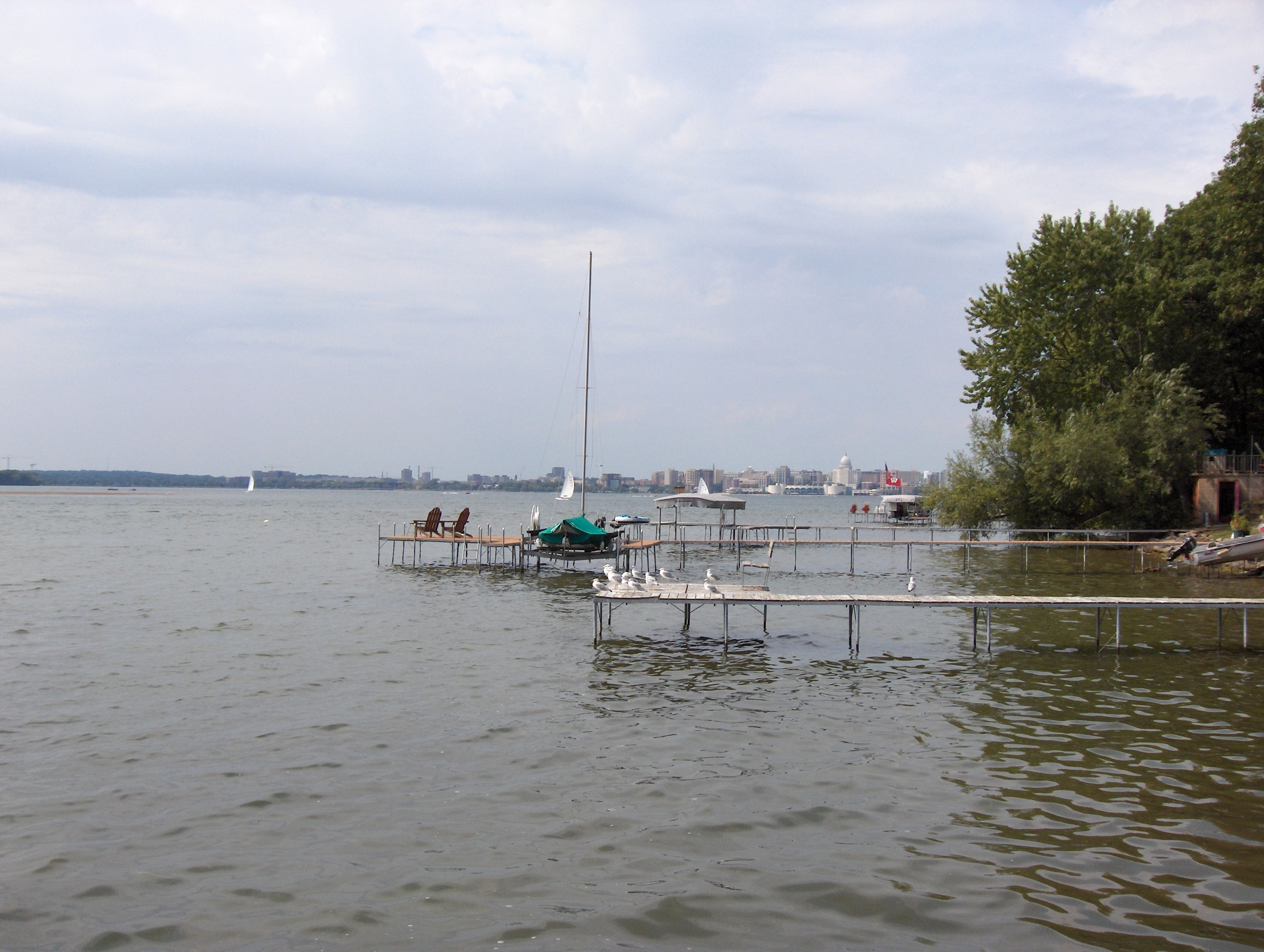
- Lake with Monona Terrace and Madison skyline in the distance

- Location within Wisconsin
- Location: Dane County, Wisconsin
- Coordinates: 43°4′9″N 89°21′34″W
- Primary inflows: Yahara River, Starkweather Creek, Murphy Creek
- Basin countries: United States
- Surface area: 3,274 acres (13 km^{2})
- Average depth: 27 ft (8.2 m)
- Max. depth: 74 ft (23 m)
- Residence time: 1.1 years
- Surface elevation: 845 ft (258 m)
- Frozen: About 107 days a year
- Settlements: Madison, Monona

Lake Monona (/mɪˈnoʊnə/ mih-NOH-nə) is a freshwater drainage lake in Dane County, Wisconsin, surrounded on three sides by the city of Madison, Wisconsin, and on the south east side by the city of Monona, Wisconsin. It is the second-largest of a chain of four lakes along the Yahara River (also including Mendota, Kegonsa, and Waubesa) in the area and forms the south shore of the isthmus that forms downtown Madison. The name 'Monona' is a word believed to mean 'beautiful', although the lake was originally named by the Ho-Chunk (Winnebago) 'Tchee-ho-bo-kee-xa-te-la' or 'Teepee Lake'.

== Description ==
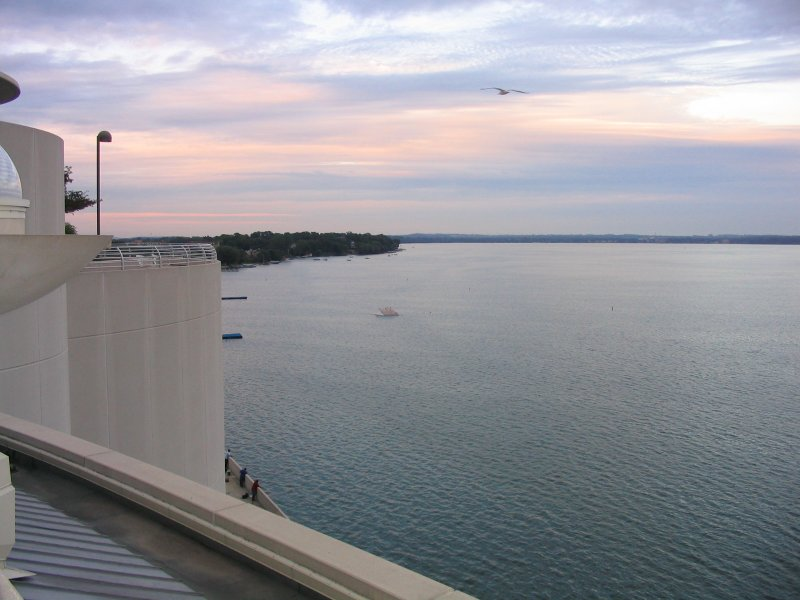
View of Lake Monona from Monona Terrace

Lake Monona rests at 43°4′9″N 89°21′34″W. It measures 3,274 acres (13.25 km^{2}), has a mean depth of 27 ft (8.2 m) and a maximum depth of 74 ft (23 m). Its volume is approximately 28 billion US gal (110 million m^{3}) and it has 13 miles (21 km) of shoreline, about 40% of which is publicly owned. The elevation of the lake is 845', regulated by locks at the mouth of the Yahara River at Lake Mendota. Monona is fed by three tributaries: the Yahara River (from Lake Mendota), Starkweather Creek, and Wingra Creek. Lake Monona is typically frozen for 107 days a year, give or take 10 days depending on the season. Access to the lake is by boat ramp.

Monona is home to many species of fish, including many panfish, and is a popular lake for fishing. Sport fish species include bluegill, lake sturgeon, largemouth bass, smallmouth bass, muskellunge (muskie), northern pike, and walleye.

Twenty-six-year-old soul singer Otis Redding died when his plane crashed in Lake Monona on December 10, 1967, during a storm en route to a concert in Madison. The pilot, who was Redding's manager, and four out of the five members of the Bar-Kays (then Otis's backup band) who were on the plane, also died, with the sole survivor being trumpeter Ben Cauley.

== See also ==
- Lake Mendota
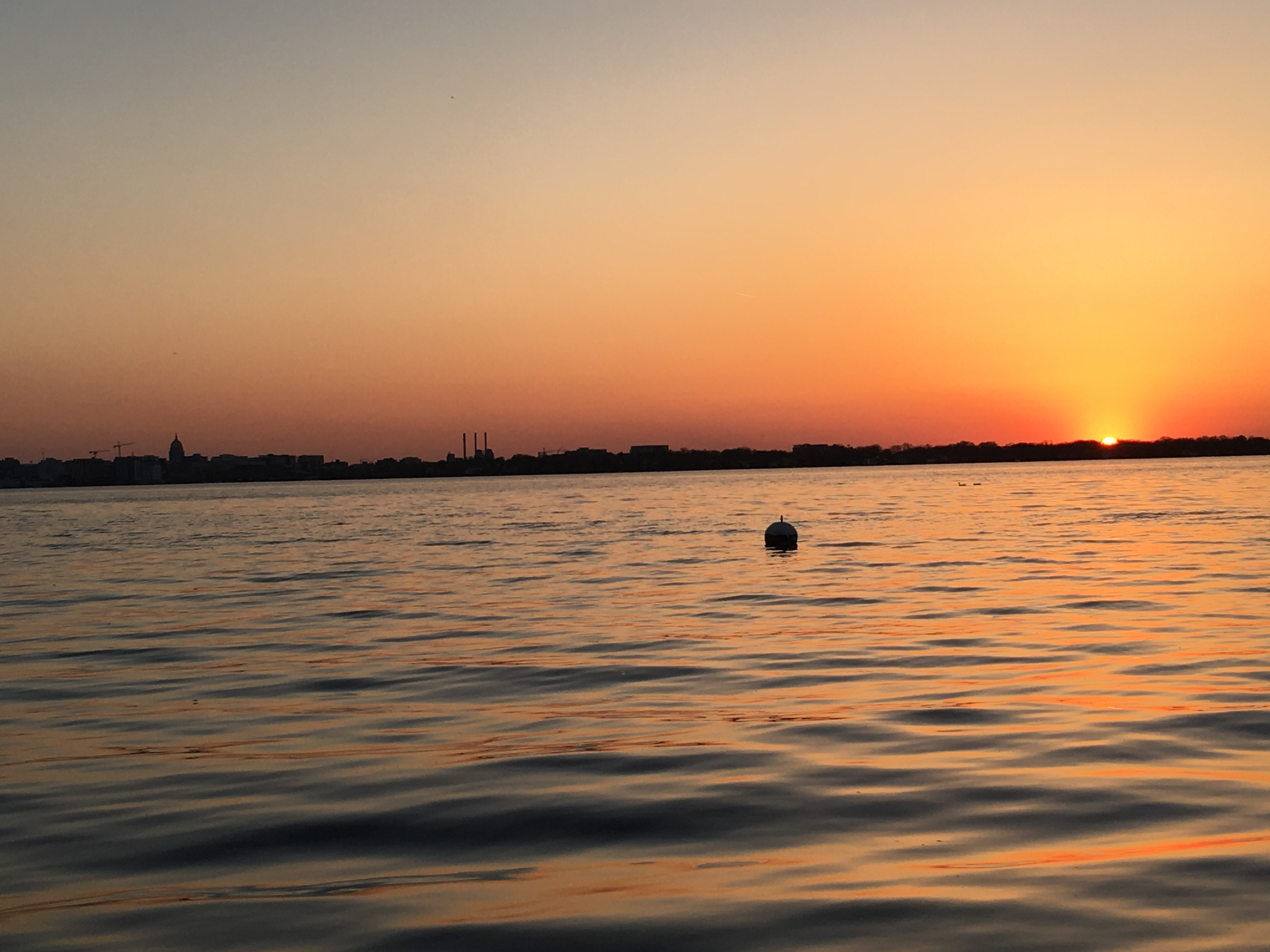
  Sunset over Lake Monona as viewed from Stone Bridge Park in Monona, WI. The City of Madison's skyline can be seen across the waters of Lake Monona.
- Lake Wingra
- Lake Waubesa
- Lake Kegonsa
