= Lake Kegonsa State Park =

State park in Dane County, Wisconsin

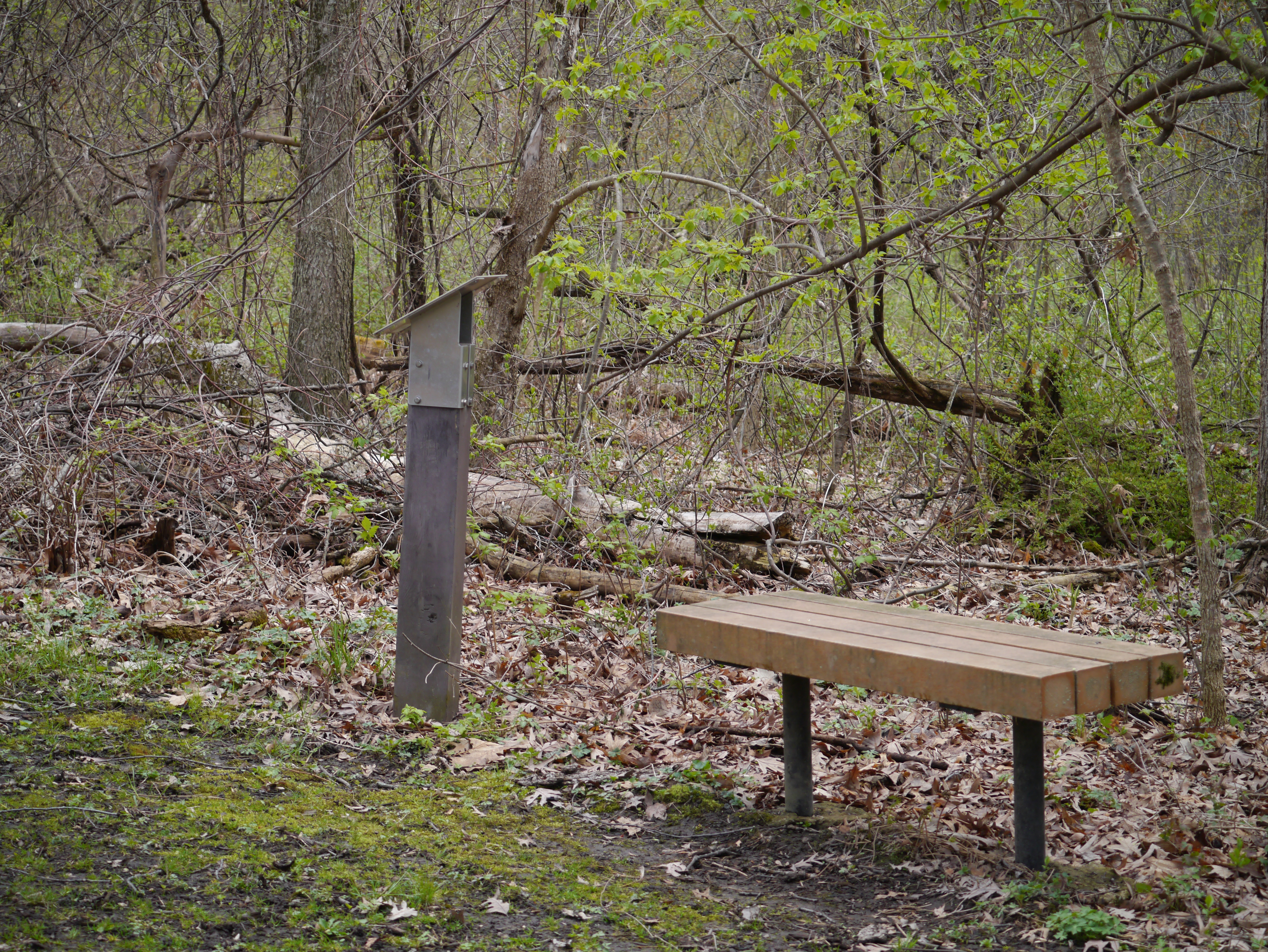
- Interactive map of Lake Kegonsa State Park
- Location: Dane County, Wisconsin, United States
- Coordinates: 42°58′35″N 89°13′55″W
- Area: 343 acres (139 ha)
- Elevation: 843 ft (257 m)
- Established: 1962
- Administrator: Wisconsin Department of Natural Resources
- Website: Official website
Lake Kegonsa
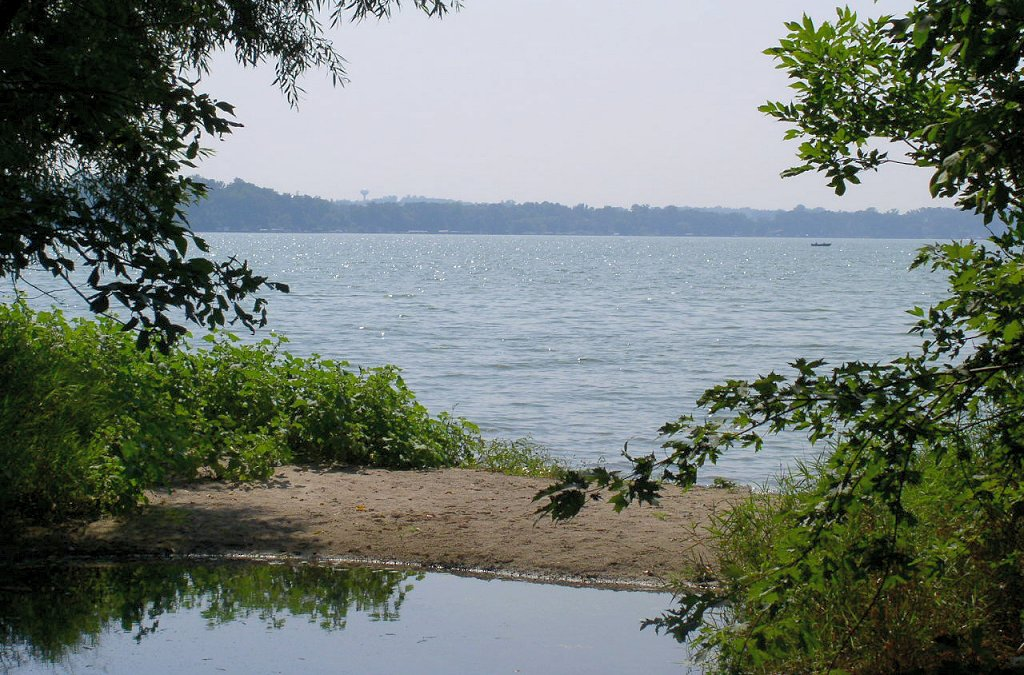

- Location within Wisconsin Location within the United States
- Coordinates: 42°58′N 89°15′W
- Basin countries: United States
- Surface area: 3,200 acres (1,300 ha)
- Max. depth: 32 ft (9.8 m)
- Surface elevation: 843 ft (257 m)

Lake Kegonsa State Park is a state park in Wisconsin, United States, on the northeast shore of Lake Kegonsa. It is located in Dane County southeast of Madison, Wisconsin. The park consists of a mix of oak woodland, prairie, and wetlands. Known for its campground, beach, and approximately 5 miles (8.0 km) of hiking trails, the park offers swimming, fishing, water-skiing, sailing, and a boat landing.

Lake Kegonsa, a glacial lake, was created during the Wisconsin glaciation of the last ice age approximately 12,000 years ago. It covers 3,209 acres (12.99 km^{2}) and has a maximum depth of over 30 feet (9 m).

== History ==
Lake Kegonsa (Nąsąkučitera, "Hard Maple Grove Lake" in Hocąk) has been occupied by the Ho-Chunk people for fishing, hunting, recreation, and as a campsite for thousands of years prior to European settlement. A fishing camp was located on Sugar Bush Point, where Lake Kegonsa State Park is today. A camp at the lake's Yahara River outlet that sheltered 106 people in 11 lodges was reported in 1829.

European settlers, many of whom were Norwegian immigrants, began using the area around the 1860s, calling it Sugarbush. Recreational uses included hunting parties, trapping, boating and fishing, picnics, and camp meetings.

In 1961, the implementation of Wisconsin's Outdoor Recreation Action Program (ORAP) called for three state parks located along the Interstate system: Willow River State Park, Mirror Lake State Park, and Lake Kegonsa State Park. Lake Kegonsa State Park was established as a state park by the State Conservation Commission in October of 1962, with land acquisition taking place from 1962 to 1965 and initial development from 1965 to 1966. The park officially opened on August 12th, 1966.

== Recreation ==
Lake Kegonsa State Park offers multiple recreational activities and amenities to visitors, including fishing, boat launch access, a swimming beach, hiking, camping, and picnic areas. The family campground has 96 campsites (29 with electric hookups) and 6 group camping sites.

Archery-only hunting and trapping are permitted in open areas of the park during the spring and fall/winter Wisconsin state park hunting seasons. Gun hunting is not permitted in the park.

Lake Kegonsa is fished year-round and most notable for walleye and panfish. The Wisconsin Department of Natural Resources stocks walleye and northern pike, which can be caught seasonally. Smallmouth bass and crappies are common. Ice fishing is popular, yielding mostly panfish with some perch, northern pikes, and walleyes. Muskellunge are occasionally present.

There is a boat launch which can be used by kayaks, canoes, paddleboards, sailboats, and motorboats. The park has a designated swimming beach with bathhouse facilities , although the beach is sometimes closed due to blue-green algae blooms.

The park has 6 named trails spanning over 5 mi (8.0 km). The 1.2 mi (1.9 km) White Oak Nature Trail is a loop through the park's 80-acre white oak woodlands, passing by two effigy mounds and a former pine plantation. The 1.3 mi (2.1 km) Prairie Trail consists of a joined north & south loop, and passes through restored prairie areas which are maintained with controlled burns. The .3 mi (0.48 km) Bluebird Trail loop leads through prairie and woodlands to the upper picnic shelter. The .8 mi (1.3 km) Oak Knoll Trail goes through the woods and a fen. The .5 mi (0.80 km) Lakeshore Trail follows the shore from the beach to the boat landing. The .1 mi (0.16 km) Wetland Boardwalk Trail is a short boardwalk ending in a wildlife viewing platform.

There are 1.2 mi (1.9 km) of designated snowshoe and winter hiking trails, with about 5 mi (8.0 km) groomed for cross-country skiing.

As of September 2024, Lake Kegonsa State Park is connected to Phase 2 of the Lower Yahara River Trail, a 1.6 mi (2.6 km) asphalt trail beginning at Fish Camp County Park with 4,200 ft (1,300 m) of wetland boardwalk and a 90 ft (27 m) bridge over Door Creek. This trail segment is accessible through the parking lot for the White Oak Trail.

== Wildlife ==
White-tailed deer (Odocoileus virginianus), eastern gray squirrels (Sciurus carolinensis), and muskrats (Ondatra zibethicus), are among the mammals frequently seen in Lake Kegonsa State Park. The park is also a popular birdwatching spot. More than 60 species are found in the park in the summer, including breeding yellow-billed cuckoos (Coccyzus americanus), prothonotary warblers (Protonotaria citrea), and warbling vireos (Vireo gilvus). Ospreys (Pandion haliaetus) and great horned owls (Bubo virginianus) are often seen nesting on the powerline stands in the area.

== See also ==
- Lake Mendota
- Lake Monona
- Lake Waubesa
