= Yahara River =

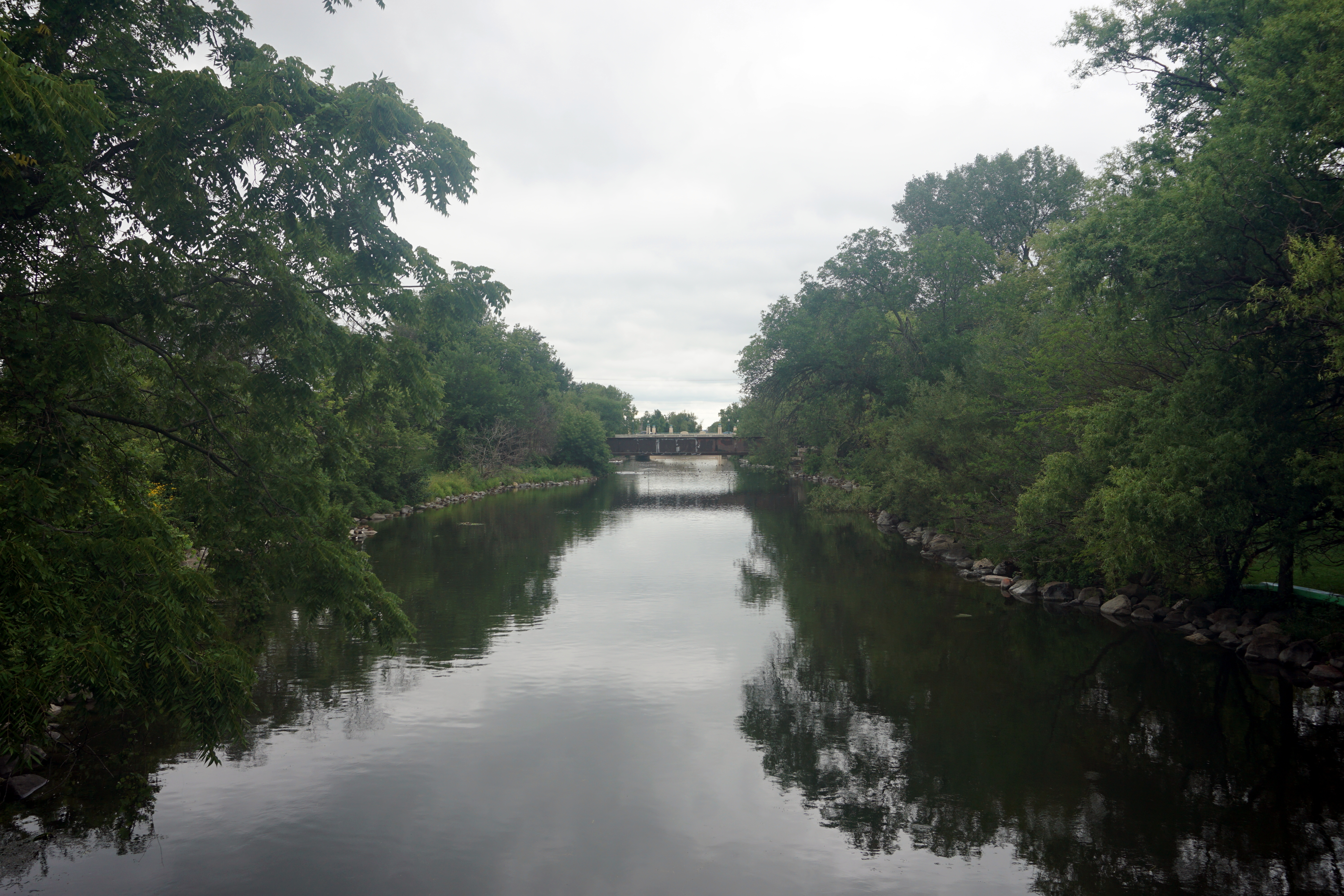
- The Yahara River in Madison

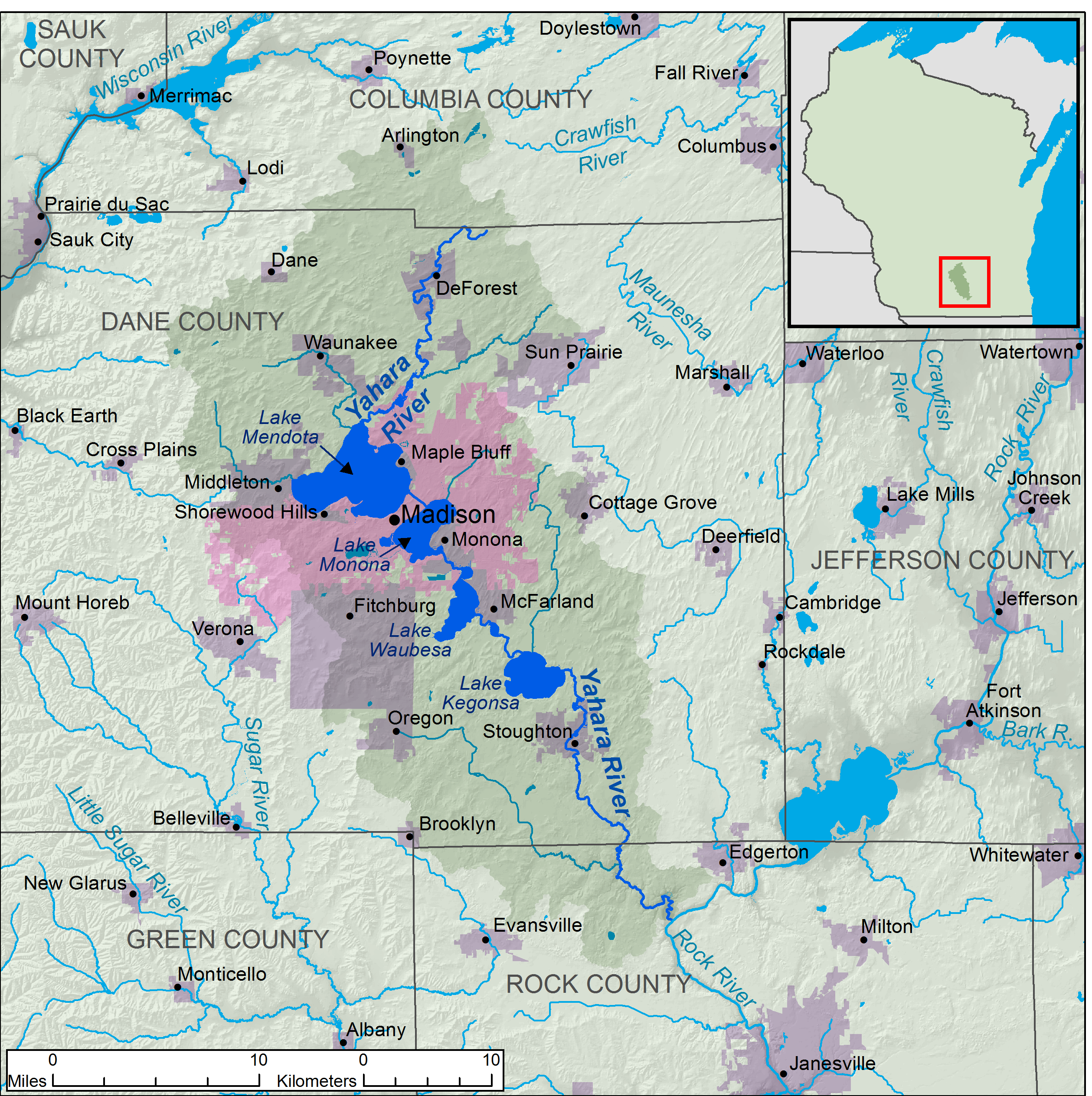
- A map of the Yahara River and its watershed

Location
- Country: United States
- State: Wisconsin
- Counties: Dane, Columbia, Rock

Physical characteristics
- Source
  - location: Windsor, Dane County
  - coordinates: 43.2808235°N 89.293449°W
  - elevation: 1,043 ft (318 m)
- Mouth: Rock River
  - location: Town of Fulton, Rock County
  - coordinates: 42.7930621°N 89.1228916°W
  - elevation: 774 ft (236 m)
- Length: 62 mi (100 km)
- Basin size: 536 sq mi (1,390 km^{2})

Basin features
- Hydrologic Unit Code: 0709000205, 0709000206, 0709000207, 0709000208, 0709000209 (USGS)

The Yahara River is a tributary of the Rock River in southern Wisconsin. It is about 62 miles (100 km) long (including the distance across intervening lakes), and drains an area of 536 square miles (1,390 km^{2}). Via the Rock River, it is part of the watershed of the Mississippi River. The Yahara River links the lakes around which the city of Madison was built.

== Description ==
The river begins in Windsor in northern Dane County and flows for a short distance in the town of Leeds in Columbia County, then returns to Dane County and flows southward through the villages of DeForest and Windsor, and the towns of Burke and Westport into Lake Mendota in the city of Madison.

Downstream from Lake Mendota, the river is channelized through the Madison Isthmus southeastward, and flows through Lake Monona, Lake Waubesa and Lake Kegonsa, passing through the city of Monona, the village of McFarland, the towns of Dunn and Pleasant Springs, the city of Stoughton and the town of Dunkirk (including the unincorporated community of Dunkirk) in Dane County; and the towns of Porter (including the unincorporated community of Stebbinsville) and Fulton (including the unincorporated community of Fulton) in northern Rock County. It joins the Rock River in the town of Fulton, approximately 9 miles (14 km) northwest of Janesville.

The U.S. Board on Geographic Names (USBGN) issued a decision clarifying "Yahara River" as the stream's name in 1903. According to the Geographic Names Information System, it has also been known historically as "Catfish River" (Sauk "Myan-mek", Potawatomi "Gooskehawn" [Gishkzhigwen], and Ho-Chunk "Gahara" [howį́ǧera]). The USBGN's 1903 investigation noted that the name "Catfish River" was in widespread use in Rock County at that time, and that "Yahara River" was more commonly used in Dane County.

During World War II, a U.S. Navy gasoline tanker, the USS Yahara (AOG-37), was named after the river.

== See also ==
- List of rivers of Wisconsin
