= Lake Waubesa =

Lake in Dane County, Wisconsin

- Location within Wisconsin Location within the United States
- Location: Dane County, near McFarland and Madison, Wisconsin, United States
- Coordinates: 43°0′47″N 89°19′28″W
- Primary inflows: Yahara River
- Primary outflows: Yahara River
- Basin countries: United States
- Surface area: 2,000 acres (810 ha)
- Max. depth: 38 ft (12 m)
- Shore length^{1}: 15 miles (24 km)
- Frozen: Average freeze date December 10
- ^{1} Shore length is not a well-defined measure.

Lake Waubesa is one of the four major lakes in Dane County, Wisconsin that surround the city of Madison. The lake has a surface area of 2,074 acres (8.39 km^{2}) and a max depth of 38 ft (12 m). The lake was historically known as Sahu Xetera (Tall Reed Lake) by the Ho-Chunk people.

This lake is fed via the Yahara River Watershed and 9 Springs Wastewater Effluent.

In 2013, the Wisconsin state record Yellow bass was caught in Lake Waubesa. It was 16.1 inches (41 cm) long and weighed 2 pounds 12 ounces (1.2 kg).

== See also ==
- Lake Mendota
- Lake Monona
- Lake Wingra
- Lake Kegonsa
