= List of shipwrecks in 2002 =

The list of shipwrecks in 2002 includes ships sunk, foundered, grounded, or otherwise lost during 2002.

table of contents
2002
| Jan | Feb | Mar | Apr |
| May | Jun | Jul | Aug |
| Sep | Oct | Nov | Dec |
Unknown date

== January ==
=== 2 January ===
List of shipwrecks: 2 January 2002
| Ship | State | Description |
|---|---|---|
| Willy | Cyprus | The tanker ran aground at Kingsand, Cornwall, England. |

=== 15 January ===
List of shipwrecks: 15 January 2002
| Ship | State | Description |
|---|---|---|
| Unnamed barge | United States | The retired 109-foot (33.2 m) barge was scuttled as an artificial reef in the North Atlantic Ocean 3.6 nautical miles (6.7 km; 4.1 mi) off Sea Girt, New Jersey, at 40°07.370′N 073°56.765′W. Her wreck is nicknamed the "Wedding Barge." |

=== 18 January ===
List of shipwrecks: 18 January 2002
| Ship | State | Description |
|---|---|---|
| Meridian | United States | The 52-foot (15.8 m) fishing vessel sank in Marmot Bay (58°00′N 152°06′W) in the Kodiak Archipelago approximately 14 nautical miles (26 km; 16 mi) north of Kodiak, Alaska. The fishing vessel Carlsen Point (United States) rescued her entire crew of three. |

== February ==
=== 1 February ===
List of shipwrecks: 1 February 2002
| Ship | State | Description |
|---|---|---|
| Le Perrain | France | The fishing vessel was abandoned 250 nautical miles (460 km; 290 mi) north of the Outer Hebrides and eighteen men were airlifted by a RAF Lossiemouth, 202 squadron, Sea King helicopter. One man, the skipper, was swept overboard and was missing. |

=== 2 February ===
List of shipwrecks: 2 February 2002
| Ship | State | Description |
|---|---|---|
| Kodima | Norway | The cargo ship ran aground in Whitsand Bay, Cornwall, England. She was refloated on 16 February and towed to Falmouth. |

=== 9 February ===
List of shipwrecks: 9 February 2002
| Ship | State | Description |
|---|---|---|
| Vehar | United States | The 39-foot (12 m) crab fishing vessel sank after striking a rock near Cape Chiniak (57°37′N 152°10′W), 13 nautical miles (24 km; 15 mi) south of Kodiak, Alaska. Her crew of three abandoned ship in survival suits and a United States Coast Guard helicopter rescued them. |

=== 18 February ===
List of shipwrecks: 18 February 2002
| Ship | State | Description |
|---|---|---|
| Contentment | United States | The 35-foot (10.7 m) cod- and crab-fishing vessel struck a rock and sank in the North Pacific Ocean approximately 40 nautical miles (74 km; 46 mi) south of King Cove, Alaska. Her crew of two was rescued by the fishing vessel Coastal Pilot (United States). |
| Tradewind | United States | The 51-foot (16 m) cod-fishing vessel sank in the North Pacific Ocean 35 nautical miles (65 km; 40 mi) south of King Cove, Alaska. Her crew of three escaped in a life raft and were rescued by the fishing vessel Temptation (United States). |

== March ==
=== 12 March ===
List of shipwrecks: 12 March 2002
| Ship | State | Description |
|---|---|---|
| Camadan | Turkey | The cargo ship sunk in bad weather in the Mediterranean Sea off Malta (35.51°N 14.53°E). All the crew were rescued. |

=== 15 March ===
List of shipwrecks: 15 March 2002
| Ship | State | Description |
|---|---|---|
| Gilbert Sea | Honduras | Cargo ship seized for carrying cocaine and sunk as an artificial reef 1.5 miles (2.4 km) from the Lake Worth Inlet, Florida. |

=== 19 March ===
List of shipwrecks: 19 March 2002
| Ship | State | Description |
|---|---|---|
| Belmonte | Brazilian Navy | The decommissioned landing ship was sunk as a target. |

=== 23 March ===
List of shipwrecks: 23 March 2002
| Ship | State | Description |
|---|---|---|
| Northern Dawn | United States | The 33-foot (10.1 m) longline halibut-fishing vessel sank off Cape Ommaney (56°10′00″N 134°40′20″W) on the coast of Southeast Alaska approximately 54 nautical miles (100 km; 62 mi) southwest of Sitka, Alaska. Her two crew members put on survival suits and abandoned ship in a life raft, from a which a United States Coast Guard helicopter rescued them. |

== April ==
=== 4 April ===
List of shipwrecks: 4 April 2002
| Ship | State | Description |
|---|---|---|
| Jawgal | Libya | The cargo ship sank in the Mediterranean Sea off the coast of Algeria. Fifteen of her 24 crew members lost their lives. |

=== 17 April ===
List of shipwrecks: 17 April 2002
| Ship | State | Description |
|---|---|---|
| Bob′s Big Boat | United States | The retired 150-or-167-foot (45.7 or 50.9 m) (source gives both lengths) fishing trawler and former floating restaurant was scuttled as an artificial reef in the North Atlantic Ocean south of Long Island 2.5 nautical miles (4.6 km; 2.9 mi) off Moriches Inlet, New York. |

== May ==
=== 8 May ===
List of shipwrecks: 8 May 2002
| Ship | State | Description |
|---|---|---|
| Sea Spray | United States | The 32-foot (9.8 m) bowpicker was destroyed by fire in Nushagak Bay off of Bristol Bay on the Bering Sea coast of Alaska. The only person aboard ran her aground and escaped onto the shore. |

=== 17 May ===
List of shipwrecks: 17 May 2002
| Ship | State | Description |
|---|---|---|
| USS Spiegel Grove | United States Navy | The decommissioned Thomaston-class dock landing ship was sunk as an artificial reef off Key Largo, Florida, at 25°04′00.2″N 80°18′00.7″W. |

=== 19 May ===
List of shipwrecks: 19 May 2002
| Ship | State | Description |
|---|---|---|
| Libby No. 12 | United States | The 43-foot (13.1 m) dive boat sank in Southeast Alaska 5 nautical miles (9.3 km; 5.8 mi) west of Craig, Alaska. The Craig harbormaster rescued the only person aboard. |

=== 21 May ===
List of shipwrecks: 21 May 2002
| Ship | State | Description |
|---|---|---|
| Unidentified barge | United States | The retired 42-foot (12.8 m) tow boat was scuttled as an artificial reef in the North Atlantic Ocean 3.1 nautical miles (5.7 km; 3.6 mi) off Barnegat, New Jersey, at 39°45.973′N 074°01.459′W. |

=== 27 May ===
List of shipwrecks: 27 May 2002
| Ship | State | Description |
|---|---|---|
| Genei Maru No. 7 | Japan | The 97-foot (29.6 m) squid-fishing catcher processor was abandoned in the North Pacific Ocean after she caught fire. She floated as a derelict until she washed ashore on 10 November in Kazakof Bay (58°06′N 152°35′W) on the coast of Afognak Island in Alaska′s Kodiak Archipelago. |

== June ==
=== 3 June ===
List of shipwrecks: 3 June 2002
| Ship | State | Description |
|---|---|---|
| Clipper Cheyenne | Bahamas | The semi-submersible dock ship sank at Foynes, County Limerick, Ireland. She was later salvaged and towed to a French port. |

=== 4 June ===
List of shipwrecks: 4 June 2002
| Ship | State | Description |
|---|---|---|
| USS Hepburn | United States Navy | The decommissioned Knox-class frigate was sunk as a target. |

=== 12 June ===
List of shipwrecks: 4 June 2002
| Ship | State | Description |
|---|---|---|
| USS Wainwright | United States Navy | The decommissioned Belknap-class guided-missile cruiser was sunk by explosive charges off Puerto Rico after being used as a missile, torpedo, and aircraft target on 11 and 12 June. |

=== 13 June ===
List of shipwrecks: 13 June 2002
| Ship | State | Description |
|---|---|---|
| Carrie of Camaret | United Kingdom | The schooner ran aground off Tory Island, County Donegal, Ireland. All eleven people on board were rescued but the vessel was a total loss. |
| Dark Star | United States | The 43-foot (13.1 m) longline halibut-fishing vessel was abandoned in the Bering Sea after she struck a submerged object northwest of Unalaska, Alaska, 8 nautical miles (15 km; 9.2 mi) west of Spray Cape (53°36′50″N 167°09′20″W) on Unalaska Island in the Aleutian Islands. |

=== 15 June ===
List of shipwrecks: 15 June 2002
| Ship | State | Description |
|---|---|---|
| Gotland | Germany | The 24.3-metre (79 ft 9 in) sailing vessel, a converted former KFK-class naval trawler, sank after a gust of wind put her on her side (54°34′N 10°10′E). The four people on board were rescued by Orban (The Netherlands). The wreck was raised on 6 July 2002. |

=== 29 June ===
List of shipwrecks: 29 June 2002
| Ship | State | Description |
|---|---|---|
| PKM-357 | Republic of Korea Navy | Second Battle of Yeonpyeong: The Chamsuri-class patrol ship was shelled and sunk by No. 684 (Korean People's Navy). The vessel was later raised. |

== July ==
=== 5 July ===
List of shipwrecks: 5 July 2002
| Ship | State | Description |
|---|---|---|
| Barbara Jean | United States | The 42-foot (12.8 m) seiner burned to the waterline and sank in 30 feet (9.1 m) of water near Point Baker, Alaska, in Frederick Sound in the Alexander Archipelago in Southeast Alaska. The fishing vessel Ruffies One (United States) rescued the only person aboard. |
| USS Rathburne | United States Navy | The decommissioned Knox-class frigate was sunk as a target in the Pacific Ocean during the RIMPAC 02 exercise. |

=== 7 July ===
List of shipwrecks: 7 July 2002
| Ship | State | Description |
|---|---|---|
| HMS Nottingham | Royal Navy | The Type 42 destroyer ran aground on Wolf Rock, Lord Howe Island, Australia and was severely damaged. Subsequently repaired and returned to service in July 2004. |

=== 8 July ===
List of shipwrecks: 8 July 2002
| Ship | State | Description |
|---|---|---|
| USS White Plains | United States Navy | The decommissioned Mars-class combat stores ship was sunk as a target in the Pacific Ocean at 22°55′00.9″N 160°10′00.3″W, during the RIMPAC 02 exercise. |

=== 10 July ===
List of shipwrecks: 10 July 2002
| Ship | State | Description |
|---|---|---|
| USS Harold E. Holt | United States Navy | The decommissioned Knox-class frigate was sunk as a target in the Pacific Ocean during the RIMPAC 02 exercise. |

=== 12 July ===
List of shipwrecks: 12 July 2002
| Ship | State | Description |
|---|---|---|
| Ana Palmira | United States | The retired 80-foot (24.4 m) fishing trawler was scuttled as an artificial reef in the North Atlantic Ocean south of Long Island 2.5 nautical miles (4.6 km; 2.9 mi) off Moriches Inlet, New York. |

=== 23 July ===
List of shipwrecks: 23 July 2002
| Ship | State | Description |
|---|---|---|
| Victor | United States | During a voyage from Bristol Bay to Prince William Sound, the 99-foot (30 m) wooden fish tender was destroyed by a fire ignited by an engine room explosion in Shelikof Strait 18 nautical miles (33 km) east of Cape Kuliuk, Alaska. Her four-member crew abandoned ship in a life raft and was rescued by a United States Coast Guard helicopter. |

=== 24 July ===
List of shipwrecks: 24 July 2002
| Ship | State | Description |
|---|---|---|
| Riptide | United States | The 30-foot (9.1 m) gillnet fishing vessel sank without loss of life in Lynn Canal in Southeast Alaska 20 nautical miles (37 km; 23 mi) north of Juneau, Alaska, after colliding with the 51-foot (15.5 m) fish tender Ola Jean (United States). Ola Jeean rescued her crew. |

=== 26 July ===
List of shipwrecks: 26 July 2002
| Ship | State | Description |
|---|---|---|
| A R 5 | United States | The 100-foot (30.5 m) fish tender struck a rock and sank in 1,080 feet (330 m) of water in Clarence Strait in the Alexander Archipelago in Southeast Alaska near Ratz Harbor (55°53′15″N 132°35′45″W), 20 nautical miles (37 km; 23 mi) south of Thorne Bay, Alaska. Her crew of three abandoned ship in a 16-foot (4.9 m) skiff and was rescued by the cruise ship Norwegian Sky (Bahamas). |
| Reaper | United States | During a voyage from Kodiak on Kodiak Island to Ketchikan in Southeast Alaska, the 32-foot (9.8 m) gillnetter sank in the Gulf of Alaska 90 nautical miles (170 km; 100 mi) southeast of Cordova, Alaska, after striking an unidentified object. A United States Coast Guard helicopter rescued the two people on board and a dog from a life raft. |

== August ==
=== 24 August ===
List of shipwrecks: 24 August 2002
| Ship | State | Description |
|---|---|---|
| Kalitan | United States | The 38-foot (11.6 m) troller burned to the waterline at Hidden Falls Hatchery in Kasnyku Bay (57°13′00″N 134°52′30″W) on the coast of Baranof Island in the Alexander Archipelago in Southeast Alaska. Her crew of three survived. |

=== 30 August ===
List of shipwrecks: 30 August 2002
| Ship | State | Description |
|---|---|---|
| Bismihita'la | Liberia | The cargo ship developed a severe list 500 nautical miles (930 km) off Cape Town, South Africa due to No. 2 hold flooding. Crew rescued by Mineral York (Liberia). Ship taken in tow by tug Suhaili. She was scuttled on 17 September at 25°12′S 9°23′E |

== September ==
=== 5 September ===
List of shipwrecks: 5 September 2002
| Ship | State | Description |
|---|---|---|
| Mantank | United States | The retired 224-foot (68.3 m) water barge was scuttled as an artificial reef in the North Atlantic Ocean east of Cape May, New Jersey, in 120 feet (36.6 m) of water at 38°58.688′N 074°11.410′W. |
| Vincent Tibbetts | United States | The retired 244-foot (74.4 m) Mettawee-class T1-M-A2 tanker was scuttled as an artificial reef in the North Atlantic Ocean east of Cape May, New Jersey, in 135 feet (41.1 m) of water at 38°58.358′N 074°11.429′W. |

=== 13 September ===
List of shipwrecks: 13 September 2002
| Ship | State | Description |
|---|---|---|
| Bligh Reef | United States | The two-member crew of the 52-foot (15.8 m) seiner abandoned ship in a life raft near the Copper River Delta (60°25′N 145°00′W) on the south-central coast of Alaska 31 nautical miles (57 km; 36 mi) southwest of Cordova, Alaska, after her steering failed in heavy seas and several attempts by the fishing vessel Snug Harbor (United States) to tow her failed when towlines parted. A United States Coast Guard helicopter rescued them from the raft. |
| Southwicks | United States | The retired 62-foot (18.9 m) barge was scuttled as an artificial reef in the North Atlantic Ocean 4 nautical miles (7.4 km; 4.6 mi) off Holgate, New Jersey, at 39°28.560′N 074°11.300′W. |

=== 24 September ===
List of shipwrecks: 24 September 2002
| Ship | State | Description |
|---|---|---|
| Sparrowcastle | United States | The 58-foot (18 m) seiner began flooding and sank in 20 minutes in the North Pacific Ocean approximately 2 nautical miles (3.7 km; 2.3 mi) south of Akutan Island in the Aleutian Islands. The only person aboard escaped in a life raft. |

=== 25 September ===
List of shipwrecks: 25 September 2002
| Ship | State | Description |
|---|---|---|
| Dakota | United States | The 50-foot (15.2 m) seine fishing vessel was destroyed by fire in Izhut Bay (58°11′N 152°15′W) on the coast of Afognak Island in Alaska′s Kodiak Archipelago. The two people aboard abandoned ship in a skiff and reached the beach, where a United States Coast Guard helicopter rescued them. |

=== 26 September ===
List of shipwrecks: 26 September 2002
| Ship | State | Description |
|---|---|---|
| Le Joola | Senegal | The passenger ferry capsized and sank in the Atlantic Ocean off the coast of Gambia with the loss of at least 1,863 of the over 2,000 people on board. |

== October ==
=== 6 October ===
List of shipwrecks: 6 October 2002
| Ship | State | Description |
|---|---|---|
| USS Okinawa | United States Navy | The decommissioned Iwo Jima-class amphibious assault ship was sunk as a target in the Pacific Ocean off the coast of Southern California at 031°27′N 119°42′W, absorbing several hits by bombs, Maverick missiles, and Harpoon missiles before being finished off by a Mark 48 torpedo fired by the submarine USS Portsmouth (United States Navy). |

=== 9 October ===
List of shipwrecks: 9 October 2002
| Ship | State | Description |
|---|---|---|
| USS Towers | United States Navy | USS Towers sinking. The decommissioned Charles F. Adams-class guided-missile destroyer was sunk as a target in the Pacific Ocean off the coast of California by the guided-missile frigate USS Sides (United States Navy). |

=== 10 October ===
List of shipwrecks: 10 October 2002
| Ship | State | Description |
|---|---|---|
| Stadt Arnis | Germany | The 15.68-metre (51 ft 5 in) tug sank in rough weather (54°12′N 11°08′E). The two crew were rescued by rescue cruiser Bremen (Germany). The ship was raised on 31 October 2002. |

=== 11 October ===
List of shipwrecks: 11 October 2002
| Ship | State | Description |
|---|---|---|
| Shenandoah | United States | While towing the 65-foot (20 m) vessel Mary J (United States) from Homer to Seward, Alaska, the 48-foot (15 m) fishing vessel disappeared with the loss of both people aboard after sending an automated distress signal from the vicinity of Chugach Bay (59°11′N 151°34′W) off the south-central coast of Alaska, probably while foundering in a storm. Mary J drifted ashore at the entrance to Windy Bay (59°13′21″N 151°29′20″W), and wreckage from Shenandoah later was found in and around Chugach Bay. |

=== 20 October ===
List of shipwrecks: 20 October 2002
| Ship | State | Description |
|---|---|---|
| Galaxy | United States | The 171-foot (52.1 m) cod-fishing catcher processor caught fire, suffered a number of explosions, and sank in the Bering Sea approximately 30 nautical miles (56 km; 35 mi) southwest of Saint Paul Island with the loss of two lives. The United States Coast Guard and the vessels Blue Pacific, Clipper Express, and Glacier Bay (all United States) rescued her 24 survivors, but Clipper Express lost one of her own crewmen when a rogue wave washed him overboard subsequent to the rescue. |
| Paper Chase | United Kingdom | The yacht was abandoned off Eastbourne, East Sussex. Her crew were rescued by the Eastbourne Lifeboat. |

=== 21 October ===
List of shipwrecks: 21 October 2002
| Ship | State | Description |
|---|---|---|
| Rockett II | United States | The 44-foot (13.4 m) longline halibut-fishing vessel was wrecked on rocks off Cape Cheerful (54°00′50″N 166°40′20″W) on Unalaska Island in the Aleutian Islands approximately 10 nautical miles (19 km; 12 mi) northwest of Dutch Harbor, Alaska. The 151-foot (46.0 m) crab-fishing vessel Stormy Sea (United States) rescued her entire crew of three. |

=== 23 October ===
List of shipwrecks: 23 October 2002
| Ship | State | Description |
|---|---|---|
| Mercury II | Azerbaijan | The cargo ship sank in the Caspian Sea with the loss of 42 of the 51 people on board. |

=== Unknown date ===
List of shipwrecks: Unknown date 2002
| Ship | State | Description |
|---|---|---|
| Elisabeth Smit | Netherlands | Elisabeth Smit in 2018 The barquentine-rigged charter ship and former minesweeper was badly damaged at her mooring at Muiden, Netherlands by a storm and abandoned. The wreck was finally broken up in situ in December 2020. |

== November ==
=== 5 November ===
List of shipwrecks: 5 November 2002
| Ship | State | Description |
|---|---|---|
| HMAS Hobart | Royal Australian Navy | The wreck of HMAS Hobart in 2010. The Perth-class guided-missile destroyer was sunk as an artificial reef and dive wreck in Yankalilla Bay, South Australia, at 35°28′51.6″S 138°09′26.0″E, 4.8 nautical miles (5.5 mi; 8.9 km) west-northwest of Marina St. Vincent. |

=== 6 November ===
List of shipwrecks: 6 November 2002
| Ship | State | Description |
|---|---|---|
| HMS Trafalgar | Royal Navy | The Trafalgar-class submarine ran aground underwater at Fladda-chuain, Scotland. She surfaced and proceeded to Faslane. Subsequently repaired and returned to service. |

=== 10 November ===
List of shipwrecks: 10 November 2002
| Ship | State | Description |
|---|---|---|
| Genei Maru No. 7 | Japan | The 97-foot (29.6 m) squid-fishing catcher processor, floating as a derelict since she was abandoned in the North Pacific Ocean on 27 May 2002 after she caught fire, washed ashore in Kazakof Bay (58°06′N 152°35′W) on the coast of Afognak Island in Alaska′s Kodiak Archipelago. |

=== 19 November ===
List of shipwrecks: 19 November 2002
| Ship | State | Description |
|---|---|---|
| HNoMS Orkla | Royal Norwegian Navy | The Alta-class minesweeper suffered an engine room explosion, caught fire and capsized the next the day in Harøyfjorden north-west of Flemsøya in Møre og Romsdal, Norway. Eleven of the thirty-three crew suffered light smoke inhalation injuries. |
| Prestige | Greece | The oil tanker broke in two and sank off Galicia, Spain, creating the Prestige oil spill, a massive oil spill polluting thousands of kilometers of coastline. |

=== Unknown date ===
List of shipwrecks: Unknown date 2002
| Ship | State | Description |
|---|---|---|
| Nge Zin Thein | Myanmar | The ferry sank on a Burmese river with the loss of an unknown number of passengers. |

== December ==
=== 4 December ===
List of shipwrecks: 4 December 2002
| Ship | State | Description |
|---|---|---|
| USS Caron | United States Navy | USS Caron sinking. The decommissioned Spruance-class destroyer was sunk 75 nautical miles (139 km; 86 mi) south of Roosevelt Roads, Puerto Rico, during explosives testing. |

=== 11 December ===
List of shipwrecks: 11 December 2002
| Ship | State | Description |
|---|---|---|
| Princess Pia | Panama | The cargo ship ran aground at Klaipėda, Lithuania and was holed. She was refloated 16 December and subsequently scrapped in October 2003. |

=== 14 December ===
List of shipwrecks: 14 December 2002
| Ship | State | Description |
|---|---|---|
| Tricolor | Norway | The vehicle carrier collided with Kariba (Bahamas) in the English Channel and sank off Dunkirk, Nord, France. The wreck was removed in 2004. |

=== 16 December ===
List of shipwrecks: 16 December 2002
| Ship | State | Description |
|---|---|---|
| Nicola | Netherlands | The cargo ship ran aground on the wreck of Tricolor (Norway). She was later refloated. |

== Unknown date ==
List of shipwrecks: Unknown date
| Ship | State | Description |
|---|---|---|
| Regina Maris | United States | The schooner sank at her moorings at Glen Cove, New York, due to the poor condition of her hull. Efforts to refloat her in 2003 damaged her beyond repair, and she subsequently was scrapped. |
