= USS Narraguagas =

History

United States
- Name: USS Narraguagas
- Namesake: Narraguagus River in Maine
- Ordered: as T1-M-A2 tanker hull, MC hull 1529
- Laid down: 30 August 1944
- Launched: 15 October 1944
- Acquired: 20 November 1944
- Commissioned: 2 December 1944
- Decommissioned: 5 March 1946
- Stricken: 16 April 1947
- Fate: Scrapped in June 1985

General characteristics
- Tonnage: 1,228 long tons deadweight (DWT)
- Displacement: 846 tons(lt) 2,270 tons(fl)
- Length: 220 ft 6 in
- Beam: 37 ft
- Draught: 17 ft
- Propulsion: Diesel direct drive, single screw, 720 hp
- Speed: 10 knots (19 km/h)
- Complement: 62
- Armament: one single 3 in (76 mm) dual purpose gun mount, two 40 mm guns, three single 20 mm gun mounts

USS Narraguagas (AOG-32) was a Mettawee-class gasoline tanker acquired by the U.S. Navy for the dangerous task of transporting gasoline to warships in the fleet, and to remote Navy stations.

Narraguagas (ex MC hull 1529) was laid down 30 August 1944 by East Coast Ship Yard, Inc., Bayonne, New Jersey; launched 15 October 1944; acquired by the Navy from the Maritime Commission 20 November 1944; and commissioned 2 December 1944.

== World War II service ==
Following shakedown, the U.S. Coast Guard-manned tanker Narraguagas reported to ComServLant, 15 January 1945, for routing through the Panama Canal to California. Attached to ServRon 8, Pacific Fleet 13 February, she moored at San Pedro, California, until departing for Pearl Harbor on the 20th. Arriving 2 March, she got underway two weeks later on a shuttle run to Johnston Island. On 6 April she sailed for Eniwetok, where she joined ServRon 10 on the 20th. By the 25th she was en route to Ulithi, whence she proceeded to Leyte and thence Kerama Retto.

=== Under attack by Japanese planes ===
Arriving in the Ryukyus 13 June, she commenced refueling operations immediately. On 21 June, at 18:42, a surprise attack on the anchorage was staged by two Japanese planes. During the action one of the planes collided with Curtiss (AV-4), while the second splashed by the Coast Guard cutter Bibb (WPG-31).

=== End-of-war activity ===
Narraguagas resumed her vital refueling operations shortly thereafter, continuing them at Kerama Retto until 7 July. She then shifted to Buckner Bay, and operated in the Ryukyus until getting underway for the United States at the end of the year.

=== Post-war decommissioning and commercial service ===
Arriving at San Pedro 10 January 1946, she commenced inactivation. Decommissioned 5 March, she was struck from the Navy List 12 April 1947 and was transferred to the Maritime Commission in June 1947 for disposal. Later that year, she was sold to Creole Petroleum Corporation, in Maracaibo, Venezuela and renamed Esso Maracaibo. In 1956, she was renamed again, to Yurtia, and in 1961 to Sarita. The tanker was scrapped in 1970.
