= USS Tetonkaha =

History

United States
- Name: USS Tetonkaha
- Namesake: Tetonkaha River in South Dakota
- Ordered: as T1-M-A2) tanker hull; MC hull 2067
- Laid down: 27 September 1944
- Launched: 29 October 1944
- Commissioned: 8 December 1944
- Decommissioned: 22 January 1946
- Stricken: 12 March 1946
- Fate: Sold; scrapped after collision in 1965

General characteristics
- Tonnage: 1,228 long tons deadweight (DWT)
- Displacement: 846 tons(lt) 2,270 tons(fl)
- Length: 220 ft 6 in
- Beam: 37 ft
- Draught: 17 ft
- Propulsion: Diesel direct drive, single screw, 720 hp
- Speed: 10 knots (19 km/h)
- Complement: 62
- Armament: one single 3 in (76 mm) dual purpose gun mount, two 40 mm guns, three single 20 mm guns gun mounts

USS Tetonkaha (AOG-41) was a Mettawee-class gasoline tanker acquired by the United States Navy for the dangerous task of transporting gasoline to warships in the fleet, and to remote Navy stations.

Tetonkaha was laid down under United States Maritime Commission contract (MC hull 2067) on 27 September 1944 at Bayonne, New Jersey, by the East Coast Shipyard, Inc.; launched on 29 October 1944; sponsored by Mrs. J. Scatorwa; and commissioned on 8 December 1944.

== World War II service ==
Tetonkaha departed New York Harbor on 30 December 1944 for Hampton Roads, Virginia; arrived at Norfolk, Virginia, on New Year's Day, 1945; and began her nine-day shakedown the next day. The gasoline tanker stood out to sea on 2 February and headed for the Netherlands West Indies. Tetonkaha arrived at Aruba on the 10th; loaded a cargo of aviation gasoline and diesel oil; headed for the California coast; and arrived at San Diego, California, on 1 March. Two days later, the ship proceeded westward to Hawaii and reported to Service Squadron 8 for duty on 14 March.

=== Pacific Ocean operations ===
Tetonkaha supplied aviation gas to outlying islands in the Hawaiian group until August when she began making shuttle runs to Johnston Island.

== Post-war activity ==
After Service Squadron 8 was dissolved on 1 September, the tanker continued on the Johnston Island shuttle for the 14th Naval District.

== Post-war decommissioning ==
Tetonkaha was relieved of duty on 6 November and returned to San Francisco, California, in December 1945. She was decommissioned at Mare Island, California, on 22 January 1946; stripped; struck from the Navy list on 12 March; and transferred to the United States Maritime Commission on 1 July 1946. In 1949, the ship was sold to the Sun Oil Co., Philadelphia, Pennsylvania, and renamed Maumee Sun. Damaged in a collision with the MV American Pilot in November 1965.The USCGC Escanaba (WHEC-64) came to her aid after the collision. The Maumee Sun was subsequently scrapped.

== Military awards and honors ==
Her crew was eligible for the following medals:

- American Campaign Medal
- Asiatic–Pacific Campaign Medal
- World War II Victory Medal
