= Ochlockonee =

Ochlockonee may refer to several things all having to do with a river in the United States:

- The Ochlockonee River in Florida
- Ochlockonee River State Park
- Ochlockonee, Florida, an unincorporated area along the river
- USS Ochlockonee (AOG-33), a U.S. Navy gasoline tanker
