= USS Waupaca =

History

United States
- Name: USS Waupaca
- Namesake: Waupaca River in Wisconsin
- Ordered: as T1-M-A2 tanker hull
- Laid down: 23 November 1944
- Launched: 4 January 1945
- Commissioned: 9 February 1945
- Decommissioned: 26 March 1946
- Stricken: 1 May 1946
- Identification: IMO number: 5238341
- Fate: Sold for commercial service 14 November 1946

General characteristics
- Tonnage: 1,228 long tons deadweight (DWT)
- Displacement: 846 tons(lt) 2,270 tons(fl)
- Length: 220 ft 6 in
- Beam: 37 ft
- Draught: 17 ft
- Propulsion: Diesel direct drive, single screw, 720 hp
- Speed: 10 knots (19 km/h).
- Complement: 62
- Armament: one single 3 in (76 mm) dual purpose gun mount, two 40 mm guns, three single 20 mm guns gun mounts

USS Waupaca (AOG-46) was a Mettawee-class gasoline tanker acquired by the United States Navy for the dangerous task of transporting gasoline to warships in the fleet, and to remote Navy stations.

Waupaca was laid down under a Maritime Commission contract (MC hull 2072) on 23 November 1944, at Bayonne, New Jersey, by the East Coast Shipyard, Inc.; launched on 4 January 1945; sponsored by Miss Muriel A. Porter; and commissioned at Marine Basin, Brooklyn, New York, on 9 February 1945.

== World War II service ==
Waupaca got underway on 7 March for Norfolk, Virginia. After conducting shakedown in Chesapeake Bay, the tanker proceeded to the Netherlands West Indies. She arrived at Aruba on 16 April and completed loading a cargo of diesel oil and aviation gasoline the following day. Underway on the 17th, she transited the Panama Canal on the 22nd, en route to southern California.

=== Pacific Ocean operations ===
After discharging her cargo upon arrival at San Diego, California, she underwent repairs in dry dock before she proceeded to Los Angeles, California. Soon after her arrival there, she loaded a cargo of diesel and lubricating oil, got underway for Hawaii on 22 May, and arrived at Pearl Harbor on 7 June.

Assigned to Service Squadron 8 upon arrival, Waupaca got underway for the Marshalls on 26 June. She arrived at Eniwetok Atoll on 8 July and reported for duty with Service Division (ServDiv) 102. Based at Eniwetok, the tanker fueled many types of ships—mainly amphibious craft, PC's, and minecraft—from 8 July through the end of hostilities in the Pacific Ocean.

=== Sighting a floating mine ===
After the surrender of Japan, ServDiv 102 received orders to Tokyo Bay to fuel smaller units of the occupation forces. With a full cargo of diesel and lubricating oils, Waupaca got underway on 7 September, as part of Task Unit (TU) 30.9.21, and proceeded for Tokyo Bay. En route, lookouts sighted a floating, drifting, horn-type mine and notified the Officer in Tactical Command (OTC) of TU 30.9.21, who dispatched a patrol craft to investigate -- PC-825 soon sank the navigational hazard with gunfire.

=== End-of-war activity ===
Waupaca anchored off Yokosuka, Japan, on the 21st, and shifted alongside the damaged Japanese battleship Nagato on the 30th to serve as a fueling station. The tanker remained in the Tokyo Bay area into the winter and returned to San Francisco, California, on 18 January 1946.

== Post-war decommissioning ==
Decommissioned on 26 March, Waupaca was struck from the Navy List on 1 May, and she was delivered to the Maritime Commission on 1 July 1946. Purchased by the Standard-Vacuum Oil Co., of New York City, New York, on 14 November 1946 and renamed Mei Shan, the tanker sailed under the Stars and Stripes until acquired by the Canadian-based firm of Oriental Trade and Transport Co., Ltd., in 1948. Successively renamed Stanvac 312 and Stanvac Mei Foo, she served under the British flag until 1954, when the Philippine subsidiary of Standard-Vacuum Oil Co., based at Manila, purchased the ship and renamed her Stanvac Visayas II. In 1963, she was acquired by Mobil Oil, Philippines, Inc., and renamed Mobil Visayas; and, in 1970, she was sold and again renamed, this time Lapu-Lapu Carrier, by Del Mar Carriers, Inc., under which name she served, under Philippine registry. Renamed Vira and finally Leap Dal in 1975, she served until 20 November 1977 when she was sold for scrapping.
