= USS Wautauga =

History

United States
- Name: USS Wautauga (AOG-22)
- Namesake: Wautauga River
- Ordered: as SS Conroe, T1-M-A2 tanker hull, MC hull 791
- Builder: Todd Galveston, Galveston, Texas
- Yard number: 111
- Laid down: 14 June 1943
- Launched: 10 January 1944
- Commissioned: 28 September 1944
- Decommissioned: 26 April 1947
- Stricken: 13 July 1948
- Fate: Transferred to the Republic of China Navy, 1947

Taiwan
- Name: ROCS Yu Chuan (AO-303)
- Fate: Wrecked, 1959; scrapped, 1964

General characteristics
- Class & type: Mettawee-class gasoline tanker
- Tonnage: 1,228 long tons deadweight (DWT)
- Displacement: 846 tons(lt) 2,270 tons(fl)
- Length: 220 ft 6 in (67.21 m)
- Beam: 37 ft (11 m)
- Draft: 17 ft (5.2 m)
- Propulsion: Diesel direct drive, single screw, 720 hp
- Speed: 10 knots (19 km/h)
- Complement: 62
- Armament: one single 3 in (76 mm) dual purpose gun mount, two 40 mm guns, three single 20 mm guns gun mounts

USS Wautauga (AOG-22) was a Mettawee-class gasoline tanker of the United States Navy during World War II.

Wautauga, formerly Conroe, was laid down on 14 June 1943 under a Maritime Commission contract (MC hull 791) at Galveston, Texas, by the Todd-Galveston Dry Dock Co.; launched on 10 January 1944; sponsored by Mrs. E. R. Cox; converted for naval use by the Todd-Houston Shipbuilding Corp., and commissioned on 28 September 1944 at Galveston.

== World War II service ==
Following shakedown, Wautauga got underway on 20 October for the U.S. West Coast and remained in the Panama Canal Zone for a week before resuming her voyage on the 29th and proceeding via San Diego, California, to the Hawaiian Islands. She eventually arrived at Pearl Harbor on 2 December and joined Service Squadron 8.

=== Western Pacific operations ===
Wautauga remained at Pearl Harbor through the end of the year 1944 and got underway on 13 January 1945 for the western Pacific Ocean, arriving at Eniwetok 12 days later. She sailed from the Marshalls on 7 February and reached Saipan on the 11th—where she remained, performing fueling and fuel carrier services until 22 May. Underway with Convoy SIW (Saipan to Iwo Jima) 28, she transported a cargo of fuel to Iwo Jima, arriving there on 25 May for a six-day stay, before returning to Saipan with Convoy IWS (Iwo Jima to Saipan ) 22.

Continuing to work out of Saipan between June 1945 and March 1946, Wautauga made two more fuel-carrying voyages to Iwo Jima; two to Marcus, and one to Guam. She returned to Pearl Harbor on 23 April and remained there, performing local oiler duties, until departing on 26 October to transport a cargo of aviation gasoline and lubricants to Canton Island. Returning to Pearl Harbor from Canton on 26 November the gasoline tanker carried cargoes of gasoline and oil to Palmyra Atoll and Guam en route to the Philippines.

== Post-war decommissioning ==
Arriving at Manila on 25 March 1947, Wautauga departed on 1 April for Subic Bay, where she arrived on the 2d to commence inactivation proceedings. Decommissioned on 26 April 1947, Wautauga was turned over to the Republic of China Navy on 15 June 1948 and struck from the Navy List on 13 July 1948. She served as Yu Chuan (AO-303) until scrapped by the Taiwanese Navy, 1959.
