= Ammonoosuc =

Ammonoosuc or Ammonusuc may refer to:

- Ammonoosuc River, in New Hampshire
- USS Ammonusuc (AOG-23), naval ship

== Other rivers in New Hampshire ==
- Upper Ammonoosuc River, distinct from the Ammonoosuc
- Wild Ammonoosuc River, a tributary of the Ammonoosuc
