= USS Yahara =

History

United States
- Name: USS Yahara
- Namesake: Yahara River in Wisconsin
- Builder: East Coast Shipyard, Inc. Bayonne, New Jersey
- Laid down: 6 June 1944
- Launched: 30 July 1944
- Commissioned: 29 September 1944
- Decommissioned: 21 May 1946
- Stricken: 19 July 1946
- Identification: IMO number: 5276288
- Honours and awards: 1 battle star
- Fate: Transferred to Maritime Commission, 5 November 1946

General characteristics
- Class & type: Mettawee-class gasoline tanker
- Type: T1-M-A2 tanker
- Tonnage: 1,228 long tons deadweight (DWT)
- Displacement: 846 long tons (860 t) light; 2,700 long tons (2,743 t) full load
- Length: 220 ft 6 in (67.21 m)
- Beam: 37 ft (11 m)
- Draft: 13 ft 1 in (3.99 m)
- Propulsion: Diesel direct drive, single screw, 720 hp (537 kW)
- Speed: 10 knots (19 km/h; 12 mph)
- Complement: 62
- Armament: 1 × 3"/50 caliber gun; 2 × single 40 mm guns; 3 × single 20 mm guns

USS Yahara (AOG-37) was a Mettawee-class gasoline tanker acquired by the U.S. Navy for the dangerous task of transporting gasoline to warships in the fleet, and to remote Navy stations.

Yahara was named by the U.S. Navy after the Yahara River, a river which rises at a small lake in Dane County, Wisconsin, and flows south and southeast through Madison, Wisconsin, to empty into the Rock River about nine miles northwest of Janesville, Wisconsin.

Yahara was laid down under a Maritime Commission contract (MC hull 1800) on 6 June 1944 at Bayonne, New Jersey, by the East Coast Shipyard, Inc.; launched on 30 July 1944; sponsored by Miss Cynthia Tenety; converted for naval service at Brooklyn, New York, by the Marine Basin Co.; and commissioned at the New York Navy Yard on 29 September 1944.

== Pacific Ocean operations ==
The new gasoline tanker got underway for Norfolk, Virginia, on 30 October. Following shakedown in Chesapeake Bay, Yahara sailed for the Netherlands West Indies on 22 November to take on a cargo of aviation gasoline and diesel oil at Aruba. Loaded to capacity, she sailed on 1 December for the west coast; transited the Panama Canal on the 6th; and proceeded via San Diego, California, to Hawaii.

Upon her arrival at Pearl Harbor on 2 January 1945, the ship joined Service Squadron (ServRon) 8. Departing Pearl Harbor on 5 January for the Phoenix group, she delivered her cargo of aviation gas and oil to Canton Island on the 13th and returned to Pearl Harbor two days later.

She continued her fuel shuttle operations in the Hawaiian chain through most of February, making runs to Johnston Island and Maui. The tanker sailed for the Marshalls on the 25th as part of Task Unit 16.8.13. En route, she delivered a cargo of aviation gasoline to the naval air station at Johnston Island for use by planes engaged in the search for Lt. Gen. Millard F. Harmon, whose plane had been lost at sea. The ship arrived at Eniwetok on 13 March and, after waiting four days for a convoy bound for the Western Carolines, got underway on St. Patrick's Day and proceeded independently to Ulithi.

Joining ServRon 10 a week later, she took on a cargo of gasoline, diesel oil, and lubricating oil. However, she stood by at Ulithi, awaiting instructions through all of April and the first half of May before the long-awaited orders arrived and directed her to join Task Force 51.

== Okinawa operations ==
On 19 May, Yahara got underway for Kerama Retto, in company with Convoy UOK 16. Rerouted en route, to the beachhead at Hagushi, the tanker arrived off Okinawa on 28 May. She remained in the Okinawa area through the cessation of hostilities in August, at Naha, le Shima, Chimu Wan, and Buckner Bay. During this period, she provided shuttle tanker services, transporting fuel from large tankers offshore to shore installations, and served as a small craft fueling center.

== Typhoon damage ==
In the course of her operations, she weathered three typhoons (19 July to 21 July; 1 August to 3 August; 16 September to 18 September) and, after the September "blow", was forced to assume emergency harbor duty, as all of the smaller yard oilers had been driven aground by the fury of the storm. A fourth typhoon struck on 9 October; and Yahara, while riding it out, lost her starboard anchor when its chain parted. The ship dragged her port anchor some three miles while winds in excess of 125 knots (232 km/h) lashed Buckner Bay.

== World War II ends ==
Her duty completed and the war over, Yahara sailed for home on 14 December, in company with sister ship Ponchatoula (AOG-38). Arriving at Pearl Harbor on 5 January 1946, Yahara resumed her voyage to the U.S. West Coast on the 9th and arrived at San Francisco, California on the 20th. She spent the remainder of the month on the California seaboard before heading for the Panama Canal and the U.S. East Coast.

== East Coast assignment ==
From 4 March to 25 April, Yahara served the 16th Fleet (the Atlantic Fleet Reserve), providing diesel oil to ships on reserve duty at Lake Charles, Louisiana, and Jacksonville, Florida.

== Decommissioning ==
Decommissioned at New Orleans, Louisiana on 21 May, Yahara was struck from the Navy list on 19 July 1946 and transferred to the War Shipping Administration, Maritime Commission, on 5 November 1946.

== Post-Decommissioning activity ==
Late in 1947, Yahara was acquired by the Texas Oil Company and renamed El Caribe. She subsequently operated under a succession of flags — Norwegian, British, and French — into the 1950s before her documentary trail becomes cloudy. Homeported at Oslo, Norway, from 1947 to 1952, she served the Texas Oil Company's Norwegian subsidiary and then sailed under the British flag with first the Verbomilia Steamship Co. and later with the Cousotanker Co., Ltd. (both of London) in 1953 and 1954. Her last recorded registry was French; and, still as El Caribe, she homeported at Marseilles, France, from 1954 to 1958, with the Societe Meridionale d'Armement. Renamed Crysanthi P, she is carried on the American Bureau of Shipping's Record from 1958 to 1960 under this name but without any clue as to her nationality or ownership. Thereafter, all trace of the ship seems to have disappeared.

== Awards ==
USS Yahara received one battle star for World War II.
