= Sacandaga =

Sacandaga may refer to:

In New York:

- Sacandaga River, a tributary of the Hudson River
- Great Sacandaga Lake, formerly the Sacandaga Reservoir, in the Adirondack State Park
- Sacandaga Lake, a small lake in Hamilton County

Ships:

- USS Sacandaga
- SS Empire Barracuda, previously called Sacandaga
