= Wakulla =

Wakulla may refer to:

Places

- Wakulla Beach, Florida
- Wakulla County, Florida
- Wakulla, North Carolina
- The Wakulla River in Florida
- Wakulla Springs

Ships

- USS Wakulla (ID-3147), a United States Navy cargo ship in commission from 1918 to 1919
- USS Wakulla (AOG-44), a United States Navy gasoline tanker in commission from 1945 to 1946

Other

- Wakulla Correctional Institution, a prison southwest of Tallahassee, Florida
- Wakulla County Airport in Wakulla County, Florida
- Wakulla High School in Crawfordville, Florida
- Wakulla (moth), a moth in the family Pyralidae
