= Yahara =

Yahara may refer to:

- Hiromichi Yahara (1902-1981), an Imperial Japanese Army officer
- Mikio Yahara (b. 1947), a Japanese karate expert and instructor
- The Yahara River in Wisconsin in the United States
- The USS Yahara, a gasoline tanker that served in the United States Navy from 1944 to 1946
