= USS Ontonagon =

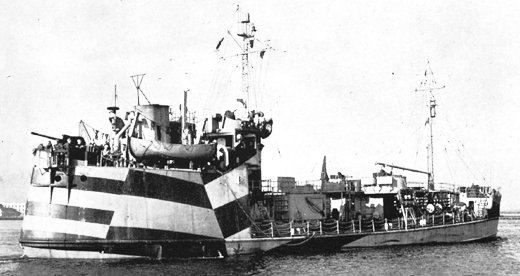

History

United States
- Name: USS Ontonagon
- Namesake: Ontonagon River in Michigan
- Ordered: as T1-M-A2) tanker hull; MC-1799
- Laid down: 10 May 1944
- Launched: 14 June 1944
- Commissioned: 21 September 1944
- Decommissioned: 27 February 1946
- In service: as USAT Ontonagon; 27 February 1946
- Out of service: 1 July 1950
- Stricken: 13 November 1957
- Reinstated: as USNS Ontonagon (T-AOG-36), 1952-1957
- Fate: fate unknown

General characteristics
- Tonnage: 1,228 long tons deadweight (DWT)
- Displacement: 846 tons(lt) 2,270 tons(fl)
- Length: 220 ft 6 in
- Beam: 37 ft
- Draught: 17 ft
- Propulsion: Diesel direct drive, single screw, 720 hp
- Speed: 10 knots (19 km/h)
- Complement: 62
- Armament: one single 3 in (76 mm) dual purpose gun mount, two 40 mm guns, three single 20 mm gun mounts

USS Ontonagon (AOG-36) was a Mettawee-class gasoline tanker acquired by the U.S. Navy for the dangerous task of transporting gasoline to warships in the fleet, and to remote Navy stations.

Ontonagon, ex MC hull 1799, was laid down 10 May 1944 by the East Coast Ship Yard Inc., Bayonne, New Jersey; launched 30 June 1944; sponsored by Mrs. Riva Halpern; and commissioned 21 September 1944.

== World War II service ==
Following shakedown in Chesapeake Bay, Ontonagon cleared Norfolk, Virginia, for the Caribbean, whence, after taking on a petroleum cargo, she continued on to the Pacific Ocean.

=== Pacific Ocean operations ===
Assigned to ServRon 8 until the spring of 1945, she assisted in the first stages of transporting and distributing gasolines to the fleet and to forward bases from the U.S. West Coast. From ServRon 8 control, supply vessels moving west passed into the operational control of ServRon 10 for dispatch to forward units. Ontonagon joined that squadron 2 April at Ulithi. Scheduled to continue on to Okinawa, she refueled ships in that anchorage as her departure date was postponed.

=== End-of-war activity ===
On 22 June she sailed for Okinawa. Arriving on the 29th, she remained in the Ryukyus, fueling ships at Kerama Retto, Hagushi, Naha and Buckner Bay through the end of the war and the end of the year. On 15 January 1946, she departed Buckner Bay for the Philippines.

== Assigned to the Army as USAT Ontonagon ==
Arriving 6 days later, she operated in Manila and Subic Bays until decommissioned, at Manila, 27 February, and transferred to the Army Transport Service as USAT Ontonagon.

== Assigned to the Navy as USNS Ontonagon (T-AOG-36) ==
Within a week of the outbreak of hostilities in Korea, Ontonagon was reacquired by the Navy for use in MSTS. Placed in service as USNS Ontonagon (T-AOG-36) and crewed by the civil service, she once again plied the waters of the Pacific to keep the oil life line to a combat area open. In January 1952 she began direct support to fleet units and bases in the combat zone, maintaining that support as a shuttle ship between Japan and Korea until June 1954.

== Stateside and decommissioning ==
Returned to the west coast in September, she was placed out of service and transferred to the Maritime Administration, at Olympia, Washington, 14 December 1954. Struck from the Navy List 22 June 1955, she remained a unit of the National Defense Reserve Fleet.

== Returned to service with MSTS ==
Ontonagon returned to Military Sea Transportation Service (MSTS) and was placed in service once again on 26 April 1956. Assigned to the North Pacific Ocean, she served with MSTS until inactivated for a third time at San Francisco, California, and placed in “ready status” in the National Defense Reserve Fleet at Suisun Bay, California, 25 September 1956.

== Final decommissioning and scrapping ==
On 13 November 1957, she was struck from the Navy List and transferred permanently to the Maritime Administration. She was scrapped in 1964.

== Military awards and honors ==
Ontonagon received one battle star for service in World War II.
