= USS Sequatchie =

History

United States
- Name: USS Sequatchie
- Namesake: Sequatchie River in Tennessee
- Ordered: as SS Royston; T1-M-A2 tanker hull,
- Laid down: 1 June 1943
- Launched: 21 December 1943
- Acquired: 5 August 1944
- Commissioned: 2 September 1944
- Decommissioned: 26 June 1946
- Stricken: 15 August 1946
- Fate: fate unknown

General characteristics
- Tonnage: 1,228 long tons deadweight (DWT)
- Displacement: 846 tons(lt) 2,270 tons(fl)
- Length: 220 ft 6 in
- Beam: 37 ft
- Draught: 17 ft
- Propulsion: Diesel direct drive, single screw, 720 hp
- Speed: 10 knots (19 km/h)
- Complement: 62
- Armament: one single 3 in (76 mm) dual purpose gun mount, two 40 mm guns, three single 20 mm gun mounts

USS Sequatchie (AOG-21) was a Mettawee-class gasoline tanker acquired by the U.S. Navy for the dangerous task of transporting gasoline to warships in the fleet, and to remote Navy stations.

Sequatchie (ex-Royston) was laid down on 1 June 1943 by Todd-Galveston Dry Dock Inc., Galveston, Texas, under Maritime Commission contract (MC hull 790); launched on 21 December 1943; sponsored by Mrs. Hazel Tometich; delivered on 5 August 1944, and commissioned on 2 September 1944.

== World War II service ==
Assigned to Service Force, Pacific, Sequatchie departed Galveston on 22 September; transited the Panama Canal at the end of the month, and joined Service Squadron (ServRon) 8 at Pearl Harbor in early November. During that month and in December, she shuttled fuel to Johnston Island and to bases in the Hawaiian Islands. On 31 December, she sailed southwestward to begin duty as a unit of ServRon 10. By mid-January she was in the Marshalls, and on 12 February, she arrived at Saipan, where she discharged cargo during March. At the end of that month, she commenced shuttling fuel to Iwo Jima and continued that duty, alternating it with station ship duty at Saipan, into August.

== End-of-war activity ==
At the end of the war, Sequatchie was at Saipan where she remained until 26 September, when she returned to Iwo Jima to assume station ship duties there. At the end of November, she returned to Saipan.

== Post-war decommissioning ==
The tanker remained in the Central Pacific until ordered back to the United States for inactivation in 1946. In March, she arrived on the U.S. West Coast. At the end of May, she got underway for the Gulf Coast; and, on 26 June, she was decommissioned at New Orleans, Louisiana. Her name was struck from the Navy List on 15 August; and, on 7 October, she was returned to the Maritime Commission and laid up in the National Defense Reserve Fleet at Mobile, Alabama. Final Disposition: fate unknown.
