= USS Calamus =

Mettawee-class gasoline tanker of the U.S. Navy

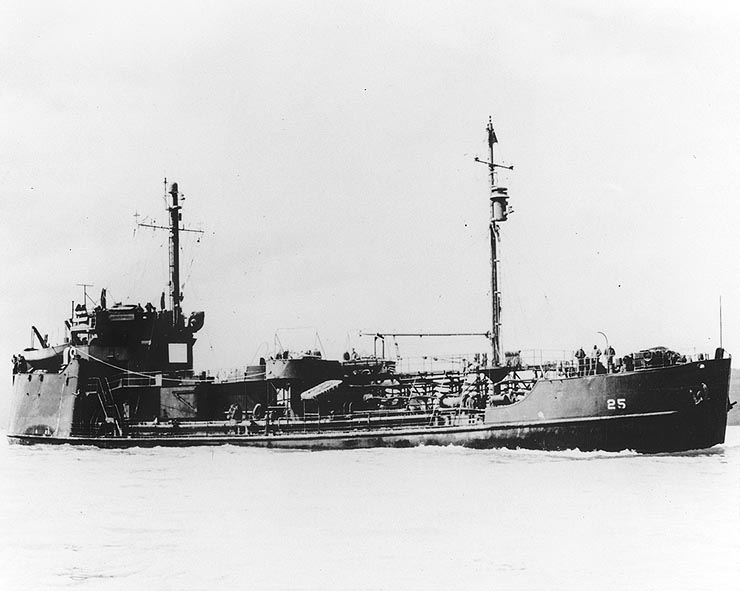
- USS Calamus (AOG-25) Underway off San Francisco, California, c. March 1946.

History

United States
- Name: USS Calamus
- Namesake: Calamus River in Nebraska, a tributary of the North Loup River
- Ordered: as T1-M-A2) tanker hull, MC hull 1522
- Laid down: date unknown
- Launched: 4 May 1944
- Acquired: 7 July 1944
- Commissioned: 7 July 1944
- Decommissioned: 15 May 1946
- Stricken: date unknown
- Fate: Scrapped in 1964

General characteristics
- Tonnage: 1,228 long tons deadweight (DWT)
- Displacement: 846 tons(lt) 2,270 tons(fl)
- Length: 220 ft 6 in
- Beam: 37 ft
- Draught: 17 ft
- Propulsion: Diesel direct drive, single screw, 720 hp
- Speed: 10 knots (19 km/h)
- Complement: 62
- Armament: one single 3 in (76 mm) dual purpose gun mount, two 40 mm guns, three single 20 mm gun mounts

USS Calamus (AOG-25) was a Mettawee-class gasoline tanker acquired by the U.S. Navy for the dangerous task of transporting gasoline to warships in the fleet, and to remote Navy stations.

Calamus was launched 4 May 1944 by East Coast Shipyard, Inc., Bayonne, New Jersey, under a Maritime Commission contract; sponsored by Mrs. A. H. Moore; transferred to the Navy 7 July 1944; and commissioned the same day.

== World War II service ==
Calamus sailed from Norfolk, Virginia, 13 September 1944, bound for Pearl Harbor and Ulithi, where she arrived in mid-December and began her work as station tanker, fueling ships of the fleet as they brought the war ever closer to the Japanese homeland.

=== Supporting the Central Pacific fleet ===
Calamus cleared for Eniwetok 20 January 1945, and until February, pumped her vital gasoline into the ships readying there for the assault on Iwo Jima. Following the fleet she served westward, Calamus did station duty at Saipan from 11 February until 26 April, when she anchored off Okinawa to support the 3-week-old assault. The tanker provided essential fueling service through the entire period of the island's assault and occupation, enduring the violent Japanese air attacks which marked the campaign as steadfastly as did the combatant ships.

=== Beached at Okinawa and refloated ===
While at Okinawa Calamus was beached as a result of Typhoon Louise, 9 October 1945, refloated 24 October 1945, repaired and returned to service.

== Post-war decommissioning ==
Following occupation service, Calamus returned to San Francisco, California, 20 March 1946 and was struck from the Navy list (date unknown). She was decommissioned 15 May 1946, and transferred to the Maritime Commission 4 September 1946. Final disposition: she was scrapped in 1964.

== Military awards and honors ==
Calamus received one battle star for service in World War II. Her crew was eligible for the following medals:

- American Campaign Medal
- Asiatic-Pacific Campaign Medal
- World War II Victory Medal
- Navy Occupation Service Medal (with Asia clasp)
