= USS Yacona (AOG-45) =

History

United States
- Name: USS Yacona
- Namesake: Yocona River in Mississippi
- Ordered: as T1-M-A2 tanker hull
- Laid down: 23 November 1944
- Launched: 14 January 1945
- Commissioned: 7 February 1945
- Decommissioned: 20 December 1945
- Stricken: 8 January 1946
- Identification: IMO number: 5394092
- Fate: Sold for commercial service; 11 March 1947

General characteristics
- Tonnage: 1,228 long tons deadweight (DWT)
- Displacement: 846 tons(lt) 2,270 tons(fl)
- Length: 220 ft 6 in
- Beam: 37 ft
- Draught: 17 ft
- Propulsion: Diesel direct drive, single screw, 720 hp
- Speed: 10 knots (19 km/h)
- Complement: 62
- Armament: one single 3 in (76 mm) dual purpose gun mount, two 40 mm guns, three single 20 mm guns gun mounts

USS Yacona (AOG-45) was a Mettawee-class gasoline tanker acquired by the U.S. Navy for the dangerous task of transporting gasoline to warships in the fleet, and to remote Navy stations.

The second ship to be named Yacona by the Navy, AOG-45 was laid down under a Maritime Commission contract (MC hull 2071) on 23 November 1944 at Bayonne, New Jersey, by the East Coast Shipyard, Inc.; launched on 14 January 1945; sponsored by Mrs. Amy Gilhardt; and commissioned on 7 February 1945.

== World War II service ==
Following shakedown in Chesapeake Bay, Yacona sailed for Miami, Florida, on 19 April. On the 25th, she departed for temporary duty at the Naval Training Station at Miami and operated out of there on training duties into the fall of 1945. A three-day port visit to Havana, Cuba, from 31 July to 3 August, punctuated her duty in Florida's coastal waters.

== Post-war activity ==
Yacona departed Miami on 4 November, bound for Hampton Roads, Virginia; and was decommissioned at Norfolk, Virginia, on 20 December 1945.

== Decommissioning ==
Struck from the Navy list on 8 January 1946, the gasoline tanker was delivered to the War Shipping Administration, Maritime Commission, on 25 July 1946. Acquired by the Gulf Oil Co., of Philadelphia, Pennsylvania, in 1947, Yacona served this petroleum concern until late in 1976, when she was purchased by the Sociedad Campania de Navegacion Dormar, Ltd. She served under the Colombian flag, homeported at Isla de San Andrés, Colombia, carrying oil to vessels in Colombia's lakes, bays, and sounds. Yacona disappeared from Lloyd's List in 1992 and was listed as presumed scrapped at that time.
