= USS Gualala =

History

United States
- Name: USS Gualala
- Namesake: Gualala River in California
- Ordered: as T1-M-A2 tanker hull; MC hull 1525
- Laid down: date unknown
- Launched: 3 June 1944
- Acquired: 19 August 1944
- Commissioned: 25 August 1944
- Decommissioned: 29 March 1946
- Stricken: 1 May 1946
- Fate: Scrapped in 1970

General characteristics
- Tonnage: 1,228 long tons deadweight (DWT)
- Displacement: 846 tons(lt) 2,270 tons(fl)
- Length: 220 ft 6 in
- Beam: 37 ft
- Draught: 17 ft
- Propulsion: Diesel direct drive, single screw, 720 hp
- Speed: 10 knots (19 km/h)
- Complement: 62
- Armament: one single 3 in (76 mm) dual purpose gun mount, two 40 mm guns, three single 20 mm gun mounts

USS Gualala (AOG-28) was a Mettawee-class gasoline tanker acquired by the U.S. Navy for the dangerous task of transporting gasoline to warships in the fleet, and to remote Navy stations.

Gualala was launched 3 June 1944, by the East Coast Ship Yard Inc., Bayonne, New Jersey, under a Maritime Commission contract; acquired by the Navy 19 August 1944; and commissioned 25 August 1944.

== World War II service ==
After completing trials, Gualala sailed from New York 23 October 1944; touching at Guantanamo, Cuba, and Christobal, she transited the Panama Canal 8 November, proceeding from there to Biak Island via Bora Bora and New Guinea.

Arriving 13 January 1945, Gualala sailed the seas between Biak, Morotai, and Mios Woendi serving as a fueling ship for fleet units. Departing Mios Woendi 4 June, she touched at Morotai before reaching Balikpapan, Borneo, the 16th. Gualala continued her fueling duties throughout the Philippines and at Saipan until 26 December 1945. when she sailed for San Francisco via Pearl Harbor.

== Post-war decommissioning ==
Arriving San Francisco, California, 31 January 1946, Gualala remained there until decommissioning 29 March 1946, at the Kaiser Shipyard No. 2, Richmond, California. Her name was struck from the Navy List 1 May 1946, and she was transferred to the Maritime Commission 10 September 1946. Gualala and her sister ship Klaskanine were subsequently overhauled at the General Engineering & Dry Dock Company in Alameda, California and sold to the Brazilian government for $500,000 each and renamed Rijo and Raza. Final disposition: scrapped in 1970.

== Military awards and honors ==
Gualala received one battle star for World War II service:

- Western New Guinea operation

Her crew was eligible for the following medals:

- American Campaign Medal
- Asiatic-Pacific Campaign Medal (1)
- World War II Victory Medal
