= USS Kanawha (AOG-31) =

History

United States
- Namesake: Kanawha River in southwest West Virginia
- Ordered: as T1-M-A2 tanker hull
- Laid down: 30 August 1944
- Launched: 18 October 1944
- Acquired: 13 November 1944
- Commissioned: 23 November 1944
- Decommissioned: 23 March 1946
- Stricken: date unknown
- Fate: Scrapped, 1964

General characteristics
- Tonnage: 1,228 long tons deadweight (DWT)
- Displacement: 846 tons(lt) 2,270 tons(fl)
- Length: 220 ft 6 in
- Beam: 37 ft
- Draft: 17 ft
- Propulsion: Diesel direct drive, single screw, 720 hp
- Speed: 10 knots (19 km/h)
- Complement: 62
- Armament: one single 3 in (76 mm) dual purpose gun mount, two 40 mm guns, three single 20 mm gun mounts

USS Kanawha (AOG-31) was a T1-M-A2 Mettawee-class gasoline tanker acquired by the United States Navy for the dangerous task of transporting gasoline to warships in the fleet, and to remote Navy stations.

The fourth ship to be named Kanawha by the Navy, AOG-31 was laid down 30 August 1944 by the East Coast Shipyard, Inc., Bayonne, New Jersey, under a United States Maritime Commission contract; launched 18 October 1944; sponsored by Mrs. May T. Norton; transferred to the Navy 13 November; and commissioned 23 November 1944.

== World War II service ==
Following shakedown in Chesapeake Bay, Kanawha cleared Norfolk, Virginia, 15 January 1945 to load oil at Aruba, Netherlands West Indies, and arrived San Pedro, Los Angeles, 13 February.

=== Pacific Fleet operations ===
She arrived Pearl Harbor 20 March and departed 6 April with a cargo of lube oil, arriving Eniwetok 2 weeks later. Kanawha continued fueling services in the Marshalls and Marianas until she departed Ulithi 7 June with a cargo of lube oil for the Philippines and arrived Leyte 11 June. The tanker operated in the Philippines for the rest of the war and began similar duties at Okinawa 6 October.

== Post-war decommissioning ==
Kanawha sailed for America 14 November and arrived Mare Island, California, 14 December via Pearl Harbor. She decommissioned 23 March 1946 and was transferred to the War Shipping Administration (WSA) August 1946. She entered the National Defense Reserve Fleet at Suisun Bay, California, 4 September. She was sold for scrapping 2 March 1964. Final disposition: scrapped, 1964.
