= USS Tularosa =

Mettawee-class gasoline tanker of the U.S. Navy

History

United States
- Name: USS Tularosa
- Namesake: Tularosa River in New Mexico
- Ordered: as T1-M-A2 tanker hull,
- Laid down: 31 October 1944
- Launched: 17 December 1944
- Commissioned: 10 January 1945
- Decommissioned: 23 April 1946
- Stricken: 21 May 1946
- Fate: Disposed of by scrapping; 7 January 1964

General characteristics
- Tonnage: 1,228 long tons deadweight (DWT)
- Displacement: 846 tons(lt) 2,270 tons(fl)
- Length: 220 ft 6 in
- Beam: 37 ft
- Draught: 17 ft
- Propulsion: Diesel direct drive, single screw, 720 hp
- Speed: 10 knots (19 km/h)
- Complement: 62
- Armament: one single 3 in (76 mm) dual purpose gun mount, two 40 mm guns, three single 20 mm gun mounts

USS Tularosa (AOG-43) was a Mettawee-class gasoline tanker acquired by the U.S. Navy for the dangerous task of transporting gasoline to warships in the fleet, and to remote Navy stations.

Tularosa was laid down under a Maritime Commission contract (MC hull 2069) on 31 October 1944 at Bayonne, New Jersey, by the East Coast Shipyards, Inc.; launched on 17 December 1944; sponsored by Miss Patricia Hefferman; acquired by the Navy on 4 January 1945; and commissioned at the New York Navy Yard on 10 January 1945.

== World War II service ==
On 4 February 1945, the new gasoline tanker steamed southward for shakedown training in the Chesapeake Bay. On 9 March, she and Dour (AM-223) got underway for Bermuda. On the 12th, she moored at St. George's Island to discharge barrels of kerosene which she had taken on at Norfolk, Virginia.

=== Pacific Ocean operations ===
A few days later, she called at Aruba to take on gasoline and diesel oil; then set her course, via the Panama Canal, for the west coast; and arrived at San Diego, California, on 8 April. She departed the U.S. West Coast on the 12th and reached Pearl Harbor on the 23d.

In May, she made a voyage to Canton Island Harbor, in the Phoenix Islands; and then returned to Pearl Harbor on the 21st, Throughout her time in the Pacific, Tularosa operated out of Oahu, carrying aviation fuel and gasoline to Johnston Island and Midway Island. She continued her duties into 1946, departed Pearl Harbor on 30 January, and returned to the west coast on 12 February.

== Post-war decommissioning ==
Assigned to the 12th Naval District for disposition, Tularosa was stripped and was decommissioned on 23 April 1946. Her name was struck from the Navy list on 21 May 1946, and she was transferred to the Maritime Commission on 28 August. The ship remained in the Suisun Bay Reserve Fleet until 7 January 1964 when she was sold to the National Metal & Steel Corp of Terminal Island, California, for $16,500. The ship was delivered to the purchaser on 23 January 1964 and was scrapped shortly afterwards.
