= USS Wakulla (AOG-44) =

History

United States
- Name: USS Wakulla
- Namesake: Wakulla River in Florida
- Ordered: as T1-M-A2 tanker hull
- Laid down: 31 October 1944
- Launched: 17 December 1944
- Commissioned: 3 February 1945
- Decommissioned: 13 June 1946
- Stricken: 19 July 1946
- Identification: IMO number: 5417612
- Fate: Sold for commercial service 14 November 1946, scrapped 1980

General characteristics
- Tonnage: 1,228 long tons deadweight (DWT)
- Displacement: 846 tons(lt) 2,270 tons(fl)
- Length: 220 ft 6 in
- Beam: 37 ft
- Draught: 17 ft
- Propulsion: Diesel direct drive, single screw, 720 hp
- Speed: 10 knots (19 km/h)
- Complement: 62
- Armament: one single 3 in (76 mm) dual purpose gun mount, two 40 mm guns, three single 20 mm guns gun mounts

USS Wakulla (AOG-44) was a Mettawee-class gasoline tanker acquired by the U.S. Navy for the dangerous task of transporting gasoline to warships in the fleet, and to remote Navy stations.

The second ship to be named Wakulla, AOG-44 was laid down on 31 October 1944 under a Maritime Commission contract (MC hull 2070) at Bayonne, New Jersey, by the East Coast Shipyards, Inc.; launched on 17 December 1944; sponsored by Mrs. J. I. McClain; accepted by the Navy on 15 January 1945; converted to naval use at the builder's yard; and commissioned at the New York Navy Yard on 3 February 1945. Named in honor of Wakulla County, FL.

== World War II service ==
Following trials in Long Island Sound and shakedown out of Norfolk, Virginia, Wakulla got underway on 23 March 1945 for the Netherlands West Indies. She loaded a full cargo of diesel oil and high-octane gasoline at Aruba and shaped course westward.

=== Pacific Ocean operations ===
She passed through the Panama Canal from 5 April to 7 April, arrived at San Diego, California, on the 22d, and got underway for the Hawaiian Islands on the 30th. Assigned to Service Squadron (ServRon) 8 soon after her 11 May arrival at Pearl Harbor, Wakulla subsequently made one voyage to Canton Island in the Phoenix group and two to Johnston Island—each time with full cargoes of high-octane gasoline. During one of her cruises to Johnston, she interrupted unloading operations to put to sea and tow LST-765 into port after a damaged screw and an inoperable rudder had left the tank landing ship adrift.

Wakulla served as yard oiler at Pearl Harbor through VJ-day.

== Post-war activity ==
After ServRon 8 was disestablished in September, the gasoline tanker operated under the dual control of the Commandant, 14th Naval District, and Commander, Service Force, Pacific Fleet, into late 1945.

== Decommissioning ==
She sailed for the U.S. West Coast in January 1946 and was decommissioned at San Francisco, California, on 13 June 1946. Wakulla was struck from the Navy list on 19 July 1946 and transferred to the Maritime Commission on 14 November 1946 where she was sold the same day for commercial service to the Oriental Trade & Transport Co where she was renamed Mei An. In 1948, she was sold to the Standard Vacuum Co and renamed Stanvac Ogan where she served until 1963 when she was sold to Petroleum Sg Service and renamed Sea Raven. Sold again in 1968 to Mobil Oil Malaya, she was renamed Mobil Service and served as such until 1980 when she was scrapped.
