= USS Sheepscot =

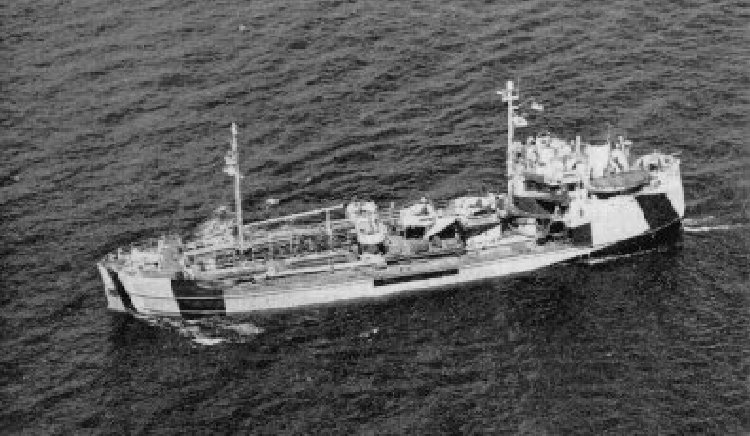

History

United States
- Name: USS Sheepscot
- Namesake: Sheepscot River in Maine
- Ordered: as Androscoggin, T1-M-A2 tanker hull, MC hull 2629
- Laid down: 15 December 1943
- Launched: 9 April 1944
- Acquired: 13 June 1944
- Commissioned: 27 June 1944
- Stricken: 1 November 1945
- Fate: capsized off Iwo Jima, 6 June 1945

General characteristics
- Tonnage: 1,228 long tons deadweight (DWT)
- Displacement: 846 tons(lt) 2,270 tons(fl)
- Length: 220 ft 6 in
- Beam: 37 ft
- Draught: 17 ft
- Propulsion: Diesel direct drive, single screw, 720 hp
- Speed: 10 knots (19 km/h)
- Complement: 62
- Armament: one single 3 in (76 mm) dual purpose gun mount, two 40 mm guns, three single 20 mm gun mounts

USS Sheepscot (AOG-24) was a Mettawee-class gasoline tanker acquired by the U.S. Navy for the dangerous task of transporting gasoline to warships in the fleet, and to remote Navy stations.

Sheepscot, as Androscoggin, was laid down under Maritime Commission contract on 15 December 1943 by the East Coast Shipyard, Inc., Bayonne, New Jersey; launched on 9 April 1944; sponsored by Mrs. John J. Gogan; (MC hull 2629) was acquired by the Navy on 13 June 1944; and commissioned on 27 June 1944.

== World War II service ==
After brief service in the Atlantic Ocean, the gasoline tanker was transferred to the Pacific Ocean.

=== Capsized near Iwo Jima ===
Sheepscot ran aground and capsized near Iwo Jima on 6 June 1945. She was damaged beyond repair and was destroyed. Her name was struck from the Navy list on 1 November 1945.

== Military awards and honors ==
Sheepscot’s crew was eligible for the following:

- American Campaign Medal
- Asiatic-Pacific Campaign Medal
- World War II Victory Medal
