= USS Escatawpa =

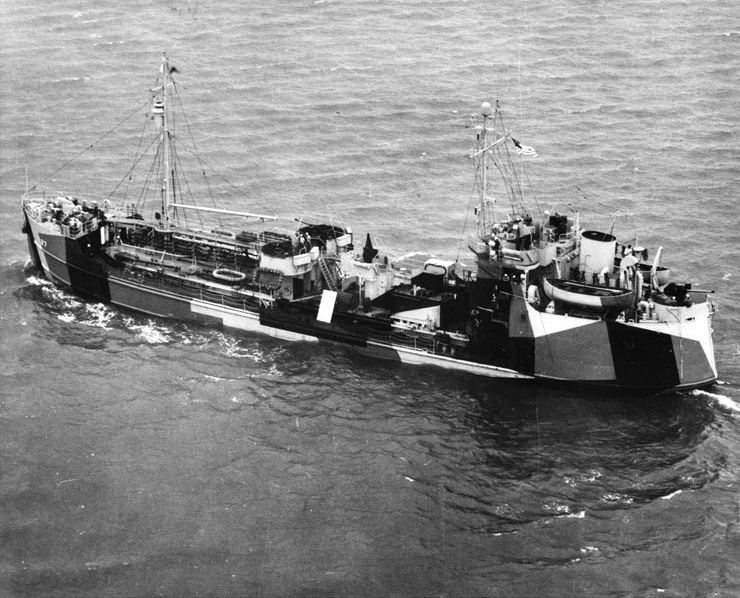
- USS Escatawpa (AOG-27) Underway in the vicinity of Hampton Roads, Virginia, 3 October 1944.

History

United States
- Name: USS Escatawpa
- Namesake: Escatawpa River in Alabama
- Ordered: as T1-M-A2 tanker hull; MC hull 1524
- Laid down: date unknown
- Launched: 3 June 1944
- Commissioned: 14 August 1944
- Decommissioned: 20 March 1946
- Stricken: date unknown
- Fate: Sunk in 1970

General characteristics
- Tonnage: 1,228 long tons deadweight (DWT)
- Displacement: 846 tons(lt) 2,270 tons(fl)
- Length: 220 ft 6 in
- Beam: 37 ft
- Draught: 17 ft
- Propulsion: Diesel direct drive, single screw, 720 hp
- Speed: 10 knots (19 km/h)
- Complement: 62
- Armament: one single 3 in (76 mm) dual purpose gun mount, two 40 mm guns, three single 20 mm gun mounts

USS Escatawpa (AOG-27) was a Mettawee-class gasoline tanker in service with the United States Navy from 1944 to 1946. In 1947, she was sold to Standard Oil tanker where she served as M/T Esso Porto Alegre until she sank in 1970.

== History ==
Escatawpa was launched by the East Coast Shipyard, Inc., Bayonne, New Jersey, on 3 June 1944 and commissioned on 18 August 1944.

=== 1944-1947 ===
She was assigned to the U.S. Pacific Fleet, operating thereafter in fueling ships and craft on an inter-island circuit in the central Pacific Ocean. A typhoon drove her aground at Kagoshima Kaiwan on 17 September 1945. She was refloated on 10 October and returned to San Francisco, California, where she was placed out of commission on 20 March 1946 and subsequently transferred to the Maritime Commission for lay up in the National Defense Reserve Fleet.

=== 1947-1970 ===
She was sold for commercial service in April 1947 to Standard Oil of Brazil where she served as M/T Esso Porto Alegre until she sank in 1970.

== Military awards and honors ==
Escatawpa’s crew was eligible for the following medals:

- American Campaign Medal
- Asiatic-Pacific Campaign Medal
- World War II Victory Medal
