= USS Ogeechee =

History

United States
- Name: USS Ogeechee
- Namesake: Ogeechee River in Georgia
- Ordered: as T1-M-A2) tanker hull
- Laid down: 7 May 1944
- Commissioned: 6 September 1944
- Decommissioned: 18 February 1946
- Stricken: 12 March 1946
- Fate: Scrapped in 1964

General characteristics
- Tonnage: 1,228 long tons deadweight (DWT)
- Displacement: 846 tons(lt) 2,270 tons(fl)
- Length: 220 ft 6 in
- Beam: 37 ft
- Draught: 17 ft
- Propulsion: Diesel direct drive, single screw, 720 hp
- Speed: 10 knots (19 km/h)
- Complement: 62
- Armament: one single 3 in (76 mm) dual purpose gun mount, two 40 mm guns, three single 20 mm gun mounts

USS Ogeechee (AOG-35) was a Mettawee-class gasoline tanker acquired by the U.S. Navy for the dangerous task of transporting gasoline to warships in the fleet, and to remote Navy stations.

Ogeechee was laid down 7 May 1944 by the East Coast Ship Yard, Inc., Bayonne, New Jersey. under a Maritime Commission contract; acquired by the Navy 31 August 1944; commissioned 6 September 1944.

== World War II service ==
Manned by U.S. Coast Guard personnel, Ogeechee conducted shakedown operations in Chesapeake Bay, then departed for Aruba, Netherlands West Indies, where she took on a full cargo of diesel oil 6 November.

=== Pacific Ocean Alaskan operations ===
Transiting the Panama Canal 13 November, she proceeded via San Diego, California, to Seattle, Washington, where she discharged her cargo and where she underwent alterations and repairs for operations in the turbulent weather of the Aleutian Chain. After taking on her first cargo of gasoline, she departed Seattle 17 January 1945 for Adak, Alaska via the inland passage, Kodiak Island, and Dutch Harbor. She delivered her cargo to Attu Island then for the next several months continued to shuttle gasoline from the major tank farm facilities at Sand Bay, Alaska to Army and Navy bases west of Dutch Harbor.

== End-of-war decommissioning ==
Ogeechee departed Kodiak 10 November for San Francisco, California, where she arrived 19 November to begin the procedure that resulted in decommissioning 18 February 1946. She was stricken from the Naval Register 12 March then transferred to the Maritime Commission and sold 1 July. She was scrapped in 1964.
