= USS Sakatonchee =

History

United States
- Name: USS Sakatonchee
- Namesake: Sakatonchee Creek in Mississippi, a tributary of the Tombigbee River
- Ordered: as T1-M-A2 tanker hull, MC hull 901
- Laid down: 13 August 1942
- Launched: 22 May 1943
- Acquired: 15 January 1944
- Commissioned: 17 January 1944
- Decommissioned: 29 March 1946
- Stricken: 1 May 1946
- Fate: Scrapped in 1964

General characteristics
- Tonnage: 1,228 long tons deadweight (DWT)
- Displacement: 846 tons(lt) 2,270 tons(fl)
- Length: 220 ft 6 in
- Beam: 37 ft
- Draught: 17 ft
- Propulsion: Diesel direct drive, single screw, 720 hp
- Speed: 10 knots (19 km/h)
- Complement: 62
- Armament: one single 3 in (76 mm) dual purpose gun mount, two 40 mm guns, three single 20 mm gun mounts

USS Sakatonchee (AOG-19) was a Mettawee-class gasoline tanker acquired by the U.S. Navy for the dangerous task of transporting gasoline to warships in the fleet, and to remote Navy stations.

Sakatonchee, MC hull 901, was laid down on 13 August 1942 by East Coast Shipyards, Inc., Bayonne, New Jersey; launched on 22 May 1943; sponsored by Miss Mary Abate; acquired by the Navy from the Maritime Commission on 15 January 1944; and commissioned on 17 January 1944.

== World War II service ==
Following shakedown off the U.S. East Coast, Sakatonchee steamed via Aruba and the Panama Canal to Milne Bay, New Guinea, arriving on 26 May 1944. She supplied petroleum products to forward bases in western New Guinea, such as those at Biak and Noemfoor islands. Her operations supported the campaign at Palawan, Philippine Islands, where the Allies landed on 28 February 1945, and at Balikpapan, Borneo, where the Allies landed on 1 July.

== Post-war decommissioning ==
In January 1946, she arrived in San Francisco, California. Decommissioned on 29 March, she was struck from the Navy list on 1 May, transferred to the Maritime Commission on 1 July, and scrapped in 1964.

== Military awards and honors ==
Sakatonchee received three battle stars for World War II service. Her crew was eligible for the following:

- American Campaign Medal
- Asiatic-Pacific Campaign Medal (3)
- World War II Victory Medal
