= USS Sacandaga =

History

United States
- Name: USS Sacandaga
- Namesake: Sacandaga River in New York
- Ordered: as T1M-A2) tanker hull; MC hull 1803
- Laid down: 4 August 1944
- Launched: 24 September 1944
- Commissioned: 9 November 1944
- Decommissioned: 23 November 1945
- Stricken: 5 December 1945
- Fate: destroyed by demolition charges

General characteristics
- Tonnage: 1,228 long tons deadweight (DWT)
- Displacement: 846 tons(lt) 2,270 tons(fl)
- Length: 220 ft 6 in
- Beam: 37 ft
- Draught: 17 ft
- Propulsion: Diesel direct drive, single screw, 720 hp
- Speed: 10 knots (19 km/h)
- Complement: 62
- Armament: one single 3 in (76 mm) dual purpose gun mount, two 40 mm guns, three single 20 mm gun mounts

USS Sacandaga (AOG-40) was a Mettawee-class gasoline tanker acquired by the U.S. Navy for the dangerous task of transporting gasoline to warships in the fleet, and to remote Navy stations.

Sacandaga was laid down on 4 August 1944 as MC hull 1803, by the East Coast Shipyard, Inc., Bayonne, New Jersey; launched on 24 September 1944; sponsored by Mrs. B. S. Chappelear; and commissioned on 9 November 1944.

== World War II service ==
After shakedown, Sacandaga departed the U.S. East Coast in January 1945 and proceeded, via the Panama Canal, to the U.S. West Coast. She arrived at San Diego, California, on 3 February and then moved on to Okinawa, stopping briefly at Pearl Harbor, Johnston Island, Eniwetok, and Ulithi.

Arriving at Okinawa on 16 May, she commenced operations under Commander, Service Squadron (ComServRon) 10 supplying aviation fuel to units afloat and ashore.

== Destroyed in a typhoon ==
Sacandaga operated in the Ryukyus, principally at Okinawa and Kerama Retto, until 9 October when, caught in a typhoon, she went aground at Baten Ko, Okinawa. Damaged beyond repair, Sacandaga was abandoned. She was decommissioned on 23 November and struck from the Navy list on 5 December. On 25 January 1946, she was declared a hazard to navigation and destroyed by demolition charges.

== Military awards and honors ==
Sacandaga earned 1 battle star during World War II.
