= USS Hiwassee =

History

United States
- Name: USS Hiwassee
- Namesake: Hiwassee River in North Carolina
- Ordered: as T1-M-A2 tanker hull
- Laid down: date unknown
- Launched: 30 August 1944
- Acquired: 17 October 1944
- Commissioned: 24 October 1944
- Decommissioned: 20 February 1946
- In service: to U.S. Army, 20 February 1946
- Out of service: 22 March 1947
- Stricken: date unknown
- Fate: fate unknown

General characteristics
- Tonnage: 1,228 long tons deadweight (DWT)
- Displacement: 846 long tons (860 t) (lt); 2,270 long tons (2,310 t) (fl)
- Length: 220 ft 6 in
- Beam: 37 ft
- Draught: 17 ft
- Propulsion: Diesel direct drive, single screw, 720 hp
- Speed: 10 knots (19 km/h)
- Complement: 62
- Armament: one single 3 in (76 mm) dual purpose gun mount, two 40 mm guns, three single 20 mm gun mounts

USS Hiwassee (AOG-29) was a Mettawee-class gasoline tanker acquired by the U.S. Navy for the dangerous task of transporting gasoline to warships in the fleet, and to remote Navy stations.

Hiwassee, a motor gasoline tanker, was launched 30 August 1944 under Maritime Commission contract by East Coast Shipyard, Inc., Bayonne, New Jersey; sponsored by Miss Harriet Savage; acquired 17 October 1944 and commissioned 24 October 1944.

== World War II service ==
Following shakedown training Hiwassee sailed through the Panama Canal to join the giant U.S. Pacific Fleet for the final phases of its island campaign, carrying her precious aviation gasoline and lubricating oil.

She arrived Ulithi 1 April 1945, the day of the landings on Okinawa, and departed 24 April for that important island. Arriving 1 May, the ship began shuttling gasoline ashore, protected from the numerous air attacks by smoke screen. She remained off Okinawa after it was secured and until decommissioning 20 February 1946.

== Assigned to the U.S. Army ==
Hiwassee was turned over to the Army at Okinawa for use there.

== Final decommissioning ==
Hiwassee was repossessed by the Navy at Subic Bay, Philippines, 25 March 1947. The tanker was subsequently sold (date unknown) to Luzon Stevedoring Co.

== Post WWII ==
TONG SHUI: (Philippine firm, Panamanian registry) 1947. Wrecked on Pratas Reef 2 Oct 53, refloated 9 Oct 53 and laid up, hulked at Manila 1956.

== Military awards and honors ==
Hiwassee received one battle star for World War II service.
