= Mettawee-class tanker =

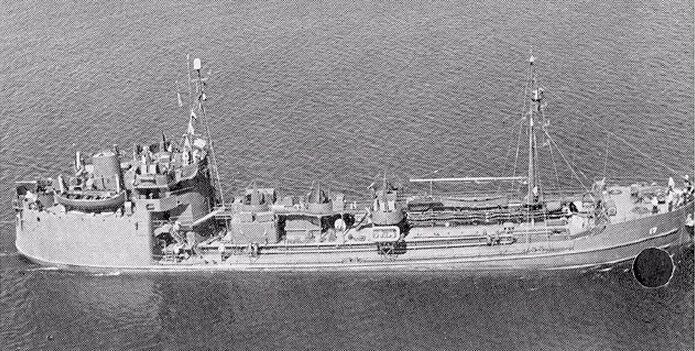
- USS Mettawee

Class overview
- Name: Mettawee class
- Completed: 34

General characteristics
- Type: Gasoline Tanker
- Tonnage: 1,228 long tons deadweight (DWT)
- Displacement: 2,280 tons (fully loaded)
- Length: 221 ft (67 m)
- Beam: 37 ft (11 m)
- Draft: 14 ft (4.3 m)
- Propulsion: One screw, diesel engines, 720 hp
- Speed: 9.5 knots (18 km/h)
- Complement: 58
- Armament: 1 × 3"/50 caliber gun; 2 × Bofors 40 mm L/60 gun; 3 × Oerlikon 20 mm cannon

The Mettawee-class gasoline tanker was a class of small gasoline tankers based on the Maritime Commission standard T1-M-A2 hull that served in World War II. The ships were completed between 1943 and 1945. Despite being charged with the dangerous task of carrying a highly volatile cargo into battle, none of the Mettawee-class tankers were destroyed, although the USS Sheepscot (AOG-24) capsized near Iwo Jima on 6 June 1945.

== Ships in class ==
- USS Mettawee (AOG-17)
- USS Pasquotank (AOG-18)
- USS Sakatonchee (AOG-19)
- USS Seekonk (AOG-20)
- USS Sequatchie (AOG-21)
- USS Wautauga (AOG-22)
- USS Ammonusuc (AOG-23)
- USS Sheepscot (AOG-24)
- USS Calamus (AOG-25)
- USS Chiwaukum (AOG-26)
- USS Escatawpa (AOG-27)
- USS Gualala (AOG-28)
- USS Hiwassee (AOG-29)
- USS Kalamazoo (AOG-30)
- USS Kanawha (AOG-31)
- USS Narraguagas (AOG-32)
- USS Ochlockonee (AOG-33)
- USS Oconee (AOG-34)
- USS Ogeechee (AOG-35)
- USS Ontonagon (AOG-36)
- USS Yahara (AOG-37)
- USS Ponchatoula (AOG-38)
- USS Quastinet (AOG-39)
- USS Sacandaga (AOG-40)
- USS Tetonkaha (AOG-41)
- USS Towaliga (AOG-42)
- USS Tularosa (AOG-43)
- USS Wakulla (AOG-44)
- USS Yacona (AOG-45)
- USS Waupaca (AOG-46)
- USS Manokin (AOG-60)
- USS Sakonnet (AOG-61)
- USS Conemaugh (AOG-62)
- USS Klaskanine (AOG-63)
