= USS Ammonusuc =

History

United States
- Namesake: A mis-spelling of the Ammonoosuc River in New Hampshire
- Ordered: as T1-M-A2 tanker hull, MC hull 1520
- Laid down: 23 November 1943
- Launched: 25 March 1944
- Acquired: 18 May 1944
- Commissioned: 19 May 1944
- Decommissioned: 4 June 1946
- Stricken: 23 April 1947
- Fate: Sold and refitted for merchant service

General characteristics
- Tonnage: 1,228 long tons deadweight (DWT)
- Displacement: 846 tons(lt) 2,270 tons(fl)
- Length: 220 ft 6 in (67.21 m)
- Beam: 37 ft (11 m)
- Draught: 17 ft (5.2 m)
- Propulsion: Diesel direct drive, single screw, 720 hp (540 kW)
- Speed: 10 knots (19 km/h)
- Complement: 62
- Armament: one single 3 in (76 mm) dual purpose gun mount, two 40 mm guns, three single 20 mm guns gun mounts

USS Ammonusuc (AOG-23) was a Mettawee-class gasoline tanker acquired by the U.S. Navy for the dangerous task of transporting gasoline to warships in the fleet, and to remote Navy stations.

Ammonusuc was laid down under a Maritime Commission contract (MC hull 1520) on 23 November 1943 at Bayonne, New Jersey, by the East Coast Shipyard, Inc.; launched on 25 March 1944; sponsored by Miss Helen T. Clark; acquired by the Navy on a loan charter basis on 18 May 1944; and commissioned on 19 May 1944.

== World War II service ==
The new gasoline tanker was fitted out at the New York Navy Yard, Brooklyn, New York, and sailed on 11 August for Norfolk, Virginia, where she underwent a period of availability. The vessel returned to New York City on 5 September to take on a cargo of aviation gasoline and diesel oil and got underway in a convoy bound for Guantánamo Bay, Cuba. The ships weathered a hurricane before reaching Cuban waters safely on 17 September. Four days later, the tanker headed for the Panama Canal Zone; and she reached Coco Solo on the 25th. After discharging her cargo, she transited the Panama Canal and reported for duty to Squadron 8, Service Force, Pacific Fleet. She sailed for San Diego, California, and arrived at that port on 12 October. After minor voyage repairs, the tanker shaped a course for Hawaii.

=== Pacific Ocean operations ===
Ammonusuc arrived at Pearl Harbor on 6 November and, shortly thereafter, made a voyage to Johnston Island to carry several thousand barrels of aviation gasoline to facilities ashore there. She unloaded the cargo at Johnston Island and then returned to Hawaii in December. On the last day of 1944, the tanker sailed in a convoy for the Mariana Islands. Following stops at Kwajalein and Eniwetok, the tanker reached Saipan on 11 February 1945. During the next seven months, she shuttled between Saipan and Iwo Jima delivering fuel oil and aviation gasoline in support of U.S. Army Air Force operations on that island.

== Post-war activity ==
Following the end of the fighting in mid-August, Ammonusuc carried medical supplies and other stores to working parties at Chichi Jima. She arrived back at Saipan on 8 January 1946. After repair work, she got underway for the west coast of the United States and reached San Francisco, California, on 8 March. The vessel then entered the shipyard at Colbert Boat Works, Stockton, California, for further repairs. Upon the completion of dock trials, she departed San Francisco Bay on 17 April in a convoy bound for the Panama Canal Zone.

Ammonusuc arrived at Balboa on 5 May, retransited the Panama Canal, and steamed independently toward New Orleans, Louisiana. She reached that port on 14 May and transferred her ammunition and stores ashore to the naval ammunition depot.

== Decommissioning ==
After a period of final preparations, Ammonusuc was decommissioned at New Orleans on 4 June 1946, and her name was struck from the Navy list on 23 April 1947. The ship was transferred to the Maritime Commission on 9 March 1948, was sold later that same year, and was refitted for service as a merchant vessel. Final disposition: fate unknown.
