= USS Ponchatoula (AOG-38) =

Tanker ship built in 1944

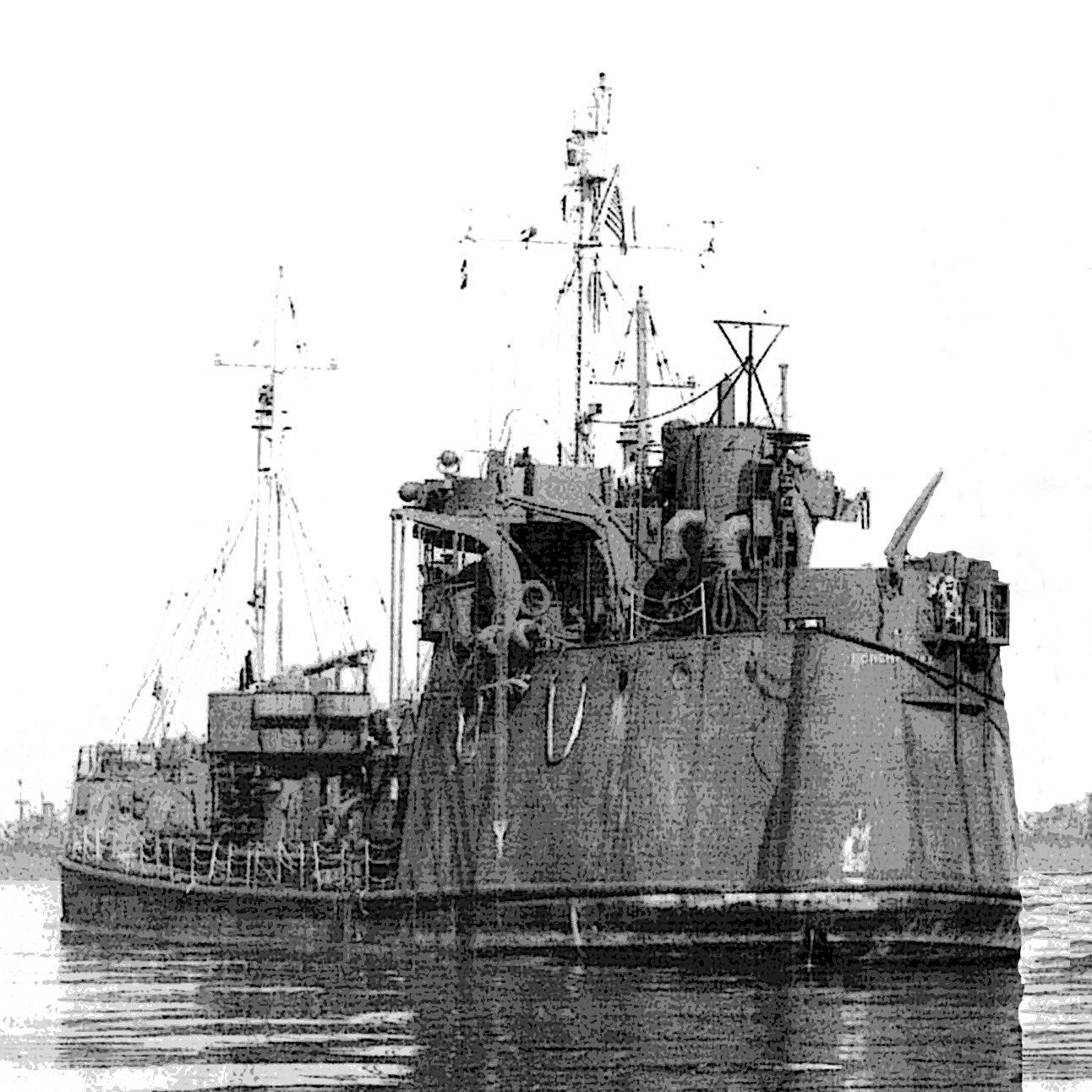

History

United States
- Name: USS Ponchatoula
- Namesake: Ponchatoula Creek
- Ordered: as T1-M-A2 tanker hull
- Laid down: 7 June 1944
- Launched: 30 July 1944
- Commissioned: 6 October 1944
- Decommissioned: 24 April 1946
- Stricken: 31 May 1946
- Identification: IMO number: 5244871
- Fate: Fate unknown, but see also USS Ponchatoula (AO 148)

General characteristics
- Tonnage: 1,228 long tons deadweight (DWT)
- Displacement: 846 tons(lt) 2,270 tons(fl)
- Length: 220 ft 6 in
- Beam: 37 ft
- Draught: 17 ft
- Propulsion: Diesel direct drive, single screw, 720 hp
- Speed: 10 knots (19 km/h)
- Complement: 62
- Armament: one single 3 in (76 mm) dual purpose gun mount, two 40 mm guns, three single 20 mm gun mounts

USS Ponchatoula (AOG-38) was a Mettawee-class gasoline tanker acquired by the United States Navy for the dangerous task of transporting gasoline to warships in the fleet, and to remote Navy stations.

Ponchatoula was laid down under United States Maritime Commission contract (MC hull 1801) by the East Coast Shipyards, Inc., Bayonne, New Jersey, 7 June 1944; launched 30 July 1944; sponsored by Miss Cynthia Tenety; delivered to the Navy 30 September 1944; and commissioned 6 October 1944.

== World War II service ==
Following shakedown, Ponchatoula departed the East Coast of the United States 13 December 1944, took on oil in the Netherlands West Indies and continued on to San Diego, California.

=== Pacific Ocean operations ===
On 19 January 1945 she headed for Pearl Harbor, whence she shuttled gasoline to Canton Island in February. In March, she sailed for Ulithi with a cargo of aviation gasoline and diesel fuel and in May crossed the remaining distance to Okinawa in convoy UOK–11, anchoring off the Hagushi beaches on the 16th. Assigned to shuttle oil and gasoline from larger tankers to the fleet's smaller ships, she shifted to Ie Shima, on the 19th and to Kerama Retto on the 29th. Remaining in the area through the end of World War II, Ponchatoula continued her shuttle service until 14 December 1945 when she got underway for the United States and inactivation.

== Post-war decommissioning ==
Decommissioned at Mare Island, California, 24 April 1946, Ponchatoula was struck from the Navy List 31 May 1946 and transferred to the United States Maritime Commission for further disposal 9 September 1946.

The ship was named "Ponchatoula" after the residents of Ponchatoula, Louisiana saw huge success in their war effort's scrap metal drive. Those who served on the ship have held reunions in their ship's namesake town. The ship's bell was donated to the town at a reunion 5 May 2010 and stands at the Ponchatoula City Hall on a makeshift mast.

== Military awards and honors ==
Ponchatoula earned one battle star during World War II.
