= USS Ochlockonee =

History

United States
- Name: USS Ocklockonee
- Namesake: Ocklockonee River in Georgia and Florida
- Ordered: as T1-M-A2 tanker hull, MC hull 1530
- Laid down: 18 October 1944
- Launched: 19 November 1944
- Acquired: 18 December 1944
- Commissioned: 29 December 1944
- Decommissioned: 14 January 1946
- Stricken: 7 February 1946
- Identification: IMO number: 5281221
- Fate: Sunk as a deep water artificial reef

General characteristics
- Tonnage: 1,228 long tons deadweight (DWT)
- Displacement: 846 tons(lt) 2,270 tons(fl)
- Length: 220 ft 6 in
- Beam: 37 ft
- Draught: 17 ft
- Propulsion: Diesel direct drive, single screw, 720 hp
- Speed: 10 knots (19 km/h)
- Complement: 62
- Armament: one single 3 in (76 mm) dual purpose gun mount, two 40 mm guns, three single 20 mm gun mounts

USS Ochlockonee (AOG-33) was a Mettawee-class gasoline tanker acquired by the U.S. Navy for the dangerous task of transporting gasoline to warships in the fleet, and to remote Navy stations.

Ochlockonee, formerly MC Hull 1530, was laid down under a Maritime Commission contract 18 October 1944 by East Coast Shipyard, Inc., Bayonne, New Jersey; launched 19 November 1944; sponsored by Mrs. Albert Robinette; acquired by the Navy 18 December 1944; and commissioned 29 December.

== World War II service ==
Following shakedown in the Chesapeake Bay, Ochlockonee departed Norfolk 15 February 1945 for Hawaii via Aruba, the Panama Canal, and San Diego, California, arriving 14 April. Operating out of Pearl Harbor for the remainder of the war, Ochlockonee made fueling runs among the Hawaiians and to Johnston and Canton Islands.

== Post-war decommissioning ==
She decommissioned at San Pedro, California, 14 January 1946, and was struck from the Navy List 7 February. Returned to the Maritime Administration on 21 June, she subsequently entered merchant service and was named Texaco No. 10, later renamed Vincent Tibbetts until laid up in 2001. Final disposition: sunk as a deep water artificial reef, 5 September 2002, off the New Jersey coast.

== Military awards and honors ==
Ochlockonee’s crew was eligible for the following medals:

- American Campaign Medal
- Asiatic-Pacific Campaign Medal
- World War II Victory Medal
