= Service Squadron =

Unit of the US Navy

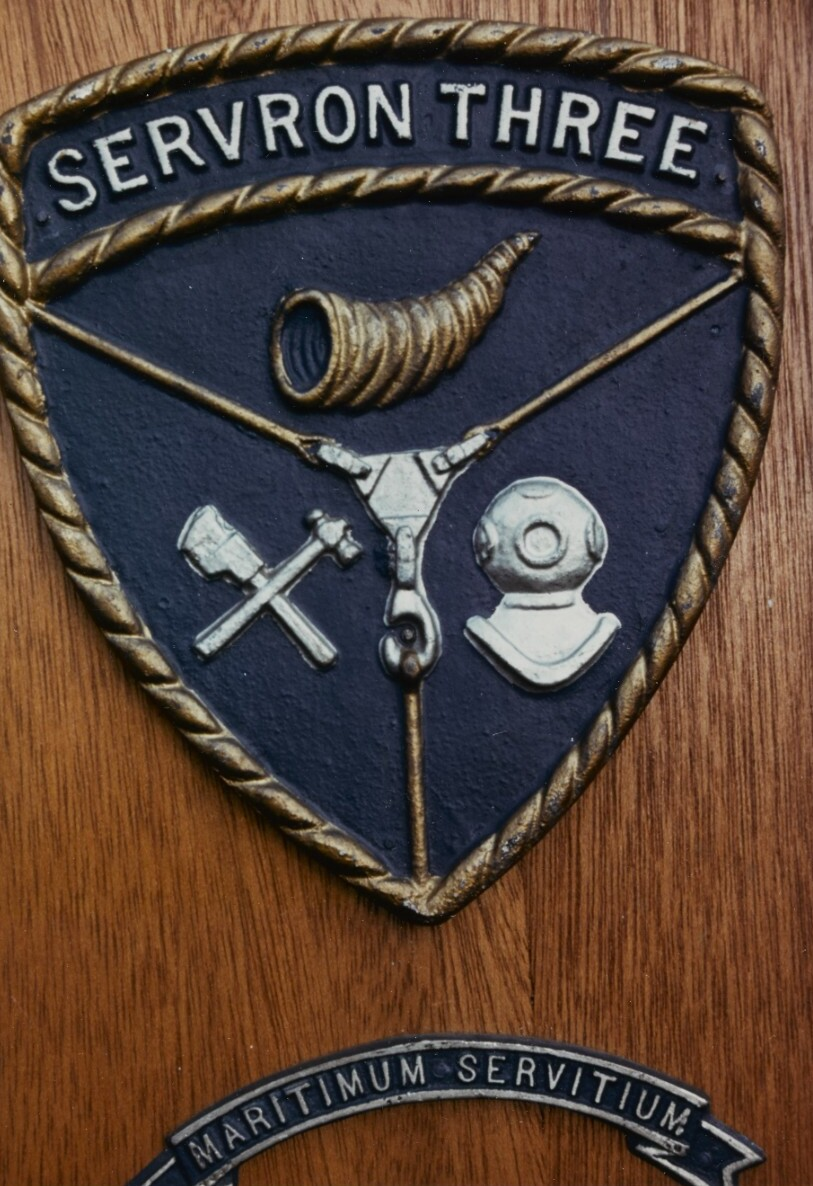
US Navy Service Squadron Three logo at Naval History and Heritage Command.

Service Squadrons (ServRons) were subdivisions of Service Force, the United States Navy command that gave logistical and other support to operations beyond the limits of American home territory during World War II and after. Some Service Squadrons were charged with creating forward bases, sending supply and maintenance ships to undeveloped harbors and atolls to dispense services to ships assigned to forward areas, while supporting the construction of more permanent facilities ashore which, when completed, would take over these functions, freeing up the ships to move ahead to the site chosen for the next base. Service Force also transported a large percentage of the supplies for the fleet to these forward bases, operated training facilities, and took charge of innumerable other functions (salvage operations, postal services, payroll distribution, aerial photography services, and housing and redistribution of newly arrived personnel, among others) which cropped up and had to be handled by someone. In short, Service Force became a "jack-of-all-trades" support force.

== Initial ServRons ==
Service Force was created as Fleet Base Force in 1921, its name being changed to Base Force in 1931, and then to Service Force in mid-1942. Initially organized to establish and then defend forward bases, on 1 April 1924 the fleet's train squadrons were absorbed into the force.Through the inter-war period this force was skeletal, consisting of only about 30 ships, divided into three units: Train Squadron 1, in the Pacific; Train Squadron 2, in the Atlantic; and Mine Squadron 2, based at Pearl Harbor. It was reorganized in mid-1941 into a force thar could be expanded on a massive scale, with five purpose-defined ServRons (with odd numbers) assigned to the Atlantic and four (with even numbers) to the Pacific.

Squadrons 1 and 2 were maintenance groups, controlling drydocks, repair vessels, hospital ships, tugs, and "splinter fleets" of small patrol vessels. Squadrons 3 and 4 were troop transport groups, and were short-lived; with the planned advance across the Pacific postponed after Pearl Harbor, these squadrons, which consisted entirely of troop transports, were removed from Service Force and the squadron designations temporarily retired. Squadrons 5 and 6 were mine warfare groups, which controlled minelayers, minesweepers, mine-assembly and disposal units, degaussing units, vessels associated with target towing and repair, and torpedo recovery units; the growth in scale of mine warfare operations in the Pacific led to the removal of these duties from the control of Service Force, Pacific, and the temporary retirement of the ServRon 6 designation. Squadrons 7 and 8 controlled cargo vessels, fuel vessels, specialized ammunition ships, and stores ships, and the disbursement of goods transported aboard them. Lastly, Squadron 9, which had no Pacific counterpart, was a sound school that dealt with sonar development and training.

== War in the Pacific ==
Service Squadrons played a vital role in the war in the Pacific during the Second World War. The Pacific Ocean, with its vast reaches, was a significant obstacle to overcome, something the Japanese had counted on as a major element in their defensive plan. For the US Navy to conduct operations against the Japanese its combat fleets would have to operate far from any established American supply or repair facilities. Japanese naval strategy ('Kantai Kessen'), consistent with the widely accepted theories put forth by the American naval instructor and historian Alfred Thayer Mahan in the 1890s, and their own experience during the Sino-Japanese and Russo-Japanese wars, was built around the idea that an enemy operating so far from home would be worn down by long, taxing sea voyages and inevitable limitations on logistical support, making them prone to defeat in a single decisive action. They sought such an opportunity throughout the war.

=== Service Squadrons and the Central Pacific Offensive ===
For nearly three decades before World War II the U. S. Navy had been planning for a war against Japan that would involve an advance into the western Pacific, the seizure of island bases along the way, and the eventual defeat of Japan through naval and aerial bombardment from the farthest forward of these bases, likely Okinawa (in what were called the "Loochoo Islands" in early planning documents). Admiral Chester Nimitz, the man in charge of executing this basic plan after the Attack on Pearl Harbor, knew that, even factoring in the extensive damage done to the U. S. Fleet during the attack, the manufacturing might of the United States would eventually supply him with a force large enough to overcome the forces of the Empire of Japan. He referred to this future force as the 'Big Blue Fleet.' Sustaining such a large naval force across the vast expanse of the Pacific--something no navy had ever attempted before--would require the creation of a supply train of unprecedented size, and bases capable of performing comprehensive maintenance relatively close to the expected combat zone.

When the Pacific Fleet, made up of the newest units of the overall U.S. Fleet, was created in 1919, the U.S. Navy did not yet have bases on the west coast adequate to fully meet their maintenance needs. As a partial solution they fell back on ship-based repair facilities, something which dovetailed well with the expectation that war would take place in the western Pacific, far from American shores. With the same thing in mind, in 1920 the Navy launched a program to develop floating drydocks of various sizes that could be towed to forward base locations during a future war, and the use of clandestine methods to scout out potential locations for such bases throughout the Pacific were at least discussed.

In accordance with long-standing plans, in mid-1941 the reorganization and expansion of what was then Base Force into a command that could accomplish these tasks began. Later, in early 1942, Base Force was renamed Service Force.

In the autumn of 1943 Admiral Nimitz, in order to refine the structure of Service Force to allow it to more efficiently handle support issues associated with the upcoming Central Pacific Offensive, ordered the creation of two additional service squadrons, designated as the second ServRon 4 (the original having been decommissioned in July 1942) and the first and only ServRon10. These squadrons were tasked with setting up and operating more-or-less fully functional bases afloat on territory newly seized as part of the new offensive. These bases would themselves be supplied largely by ships operated by ServRon 8, although by this time numerous other entities were also handling shipping across rear areas.

The new ServRon 4 was commissioned on 1 November 1943, with its mission being to set up, and then provide logistic support to fleet operations, from floating mobile bases. The squadron initially was made up of 24 vessels and had its base in the South Pacific at Funafuti Atoll, 300 miles (480 km) north of Apia (in Samoa) and 800 miles (1,300 km) south of Howland Island. The destroyer tender Cascade, under the command of Captain Samuel Ogden, was the flagship for the squadron. The command included repair ships (including an internal combustion engine repair ship), ammunition ships, general stores (food, etc.) ships, refrigerator ships, oilers, a hospital ship, and troopships, many of these being used for housing and storage until purpose-built ships or shore facilities could be established. The Cascade arrived at Funafuti on 21 November 1943 and remained there until February 1944. Meanwhile, during this period Captain Worrall Reed Carter was organizing the parallel Service Squadron 10, which was commissioned on 15 January 1944 at Pearl Harbor.

The first operation in which one of the new squadrons was used was Operation Galvanic, the November 1943 seizure of the Gilbert Islands. Following the actual seizure, vessels of ServRon 4, following closely behind, anchored within the atoll, and began to distribute food, fuel, and ammunition to ships of the combat fleet; to provide medical services to personnel injured during the seizure, from aboard hospital ships; to undertake repairs to vessels damaged during the operation, using facilities on assorted specialized repair vessels; and, slightly later, to provide living facilities (eventually aboard "barracks barges") to unassigned personnel brought in to serve as replacements during ongoing operations. These were supplemented by support vessels--tugboats, netlayers, minelayers, minesweepers, small patrol vessels, seaplane tenders, and an assortment of lighters and small boats, among others--which helped facilitate the operations of the ships offering direct suport. They also offered support to crews building shore facilities--airfields, fuel tank farms, warehouses, fixed hospitals, recreation facilities, wharves, and pipelines (to carry fuel from anchored vessels to storage facilities), among other things, on and adjacent to the tiny "islands" (actually, for the most part, simply broad, sediment-covered portions of the perimeter coral reef of the atoll, the only bits of dry land large enough to build on) scattered about the atoll. These shore facilities, once completed, would be turned over to assorted other commands for ongoing operations. Meanwhile, as this development was taking place, the next amphibious operation, the invasion of the Marshall Islands (Operation Flintlock), was under way, and once the first atoll targeted by that operation, Majuro, was secured, the newly commissioned ServRon 10 was sent along to perform the tasks that ServRon 4 had taken care of in the Gilberts. Captain Worrall R. Carter, commanding officer of ServRon 10, who devised the original operational plan for the two squadrons, had intended for ServRons 4 and 10 to leapfrog past each other, taking turns setting up bases as the offensive progressed, but this did not last: in March 1944, as ServRon 4 advanced toward its next atoll target, in the western Marshalls, it was decided that there was no reason to have these as two separate squadrons, and ServRon 4 was absorbed into ServRon 10.

Admiral Nimitz referred to Service Squadron 4 and Service Squadron 10 as his "secret weapons," but these squadrons were not alone in delivering supplies to the fleet. From late 1944 onward, as operations in Japanese home waters were undertaken, a new element was added to the forward-supply system: with the Fast Carrier Force (Task Force 38/58) the principal U. S. Navy unit engaged in maintaining pressure on the Japanese through ongoing air strikes, being called on to remain constantly on station, a new ServRon, the second to be called ServRon 6, was created and tasked with supplying this task force with fuel and avgas at sea, rotating tankers back to ServRon 10 bases for replenishment rather than requiring combat vessels to go back themselves. By early 1945 this squadron could also deliver anmunition, including heavy shells, and a wide variety of other supplies (in somewhat limited quantities) to ships at sea; early on most of these supplies were carried aboard the oilers that comprised (along with a few escort carriers and destroyer-escorts) virtually the entire squadron, but specialized transports were eventually taken along as well.

One additional squadron that was added to the force near the end of the war was ServRon 12. This unit's assignment was the repair and development of harbor facilities in forward areas, notably at Apra Harbor on Guam. The emphasis on Guam was a consequence of the fact that this was the only forward-area base that was to revert to being U.S. territory--indeed to being a major U.S. base--after the war. A distinguishing feature of this squadron was the inclusion of a large number of dredges asmongbits equipment.

== Service Force in the South and Southwest Pacific ==
In the spring of 1942, with the immediate advance across the Pacific called for in inter-war plans placed on hold after the Pearl Harbor attack, the focus of the Pacific fleet became centered on the south-central Pacific. Undamaged elements of the Pacific Fleet, operating out of Hawaii and supported by Service Force units based there, initially carried out most activities in the region, but by the summer of 1942 a separate command designated as the South Pacific Force, had been set up, and a new subdivision of Service Force, designated Service Squadron, South Pacific, was added to supply this command. Meanwhile after the fall of the Philippines and the Netherlands East Indies, remnants of the U.S. Asiatic Fleet, mainly submarines, set up shop at bases in Western Australia, becoming known as the Southwest Pacific Force, and in November 1942 still another Service Force subdivision called Service Force, Southwest Pacific was established to meet theit needs. While Service Force, Pacific operated out of Pearl Harbor, and early on, most shipments of supplies destined for any place in the theater passed through Hawaii, Service Squadron, South Pacific and Service Force, Southwest Pacific served units that could be supplied more efficiently via supply chains that bypassed Hawaii and ran directly from the west coast to the South Pacific. To oversee the assembly of supplies and dispatch them via this alternate routing a shore-based, non-squadron division of Service Force, based in San Francisco and known as Subotdinate Command.

xx

== Bases established by ServRon 10 ==
=== Majuro ===
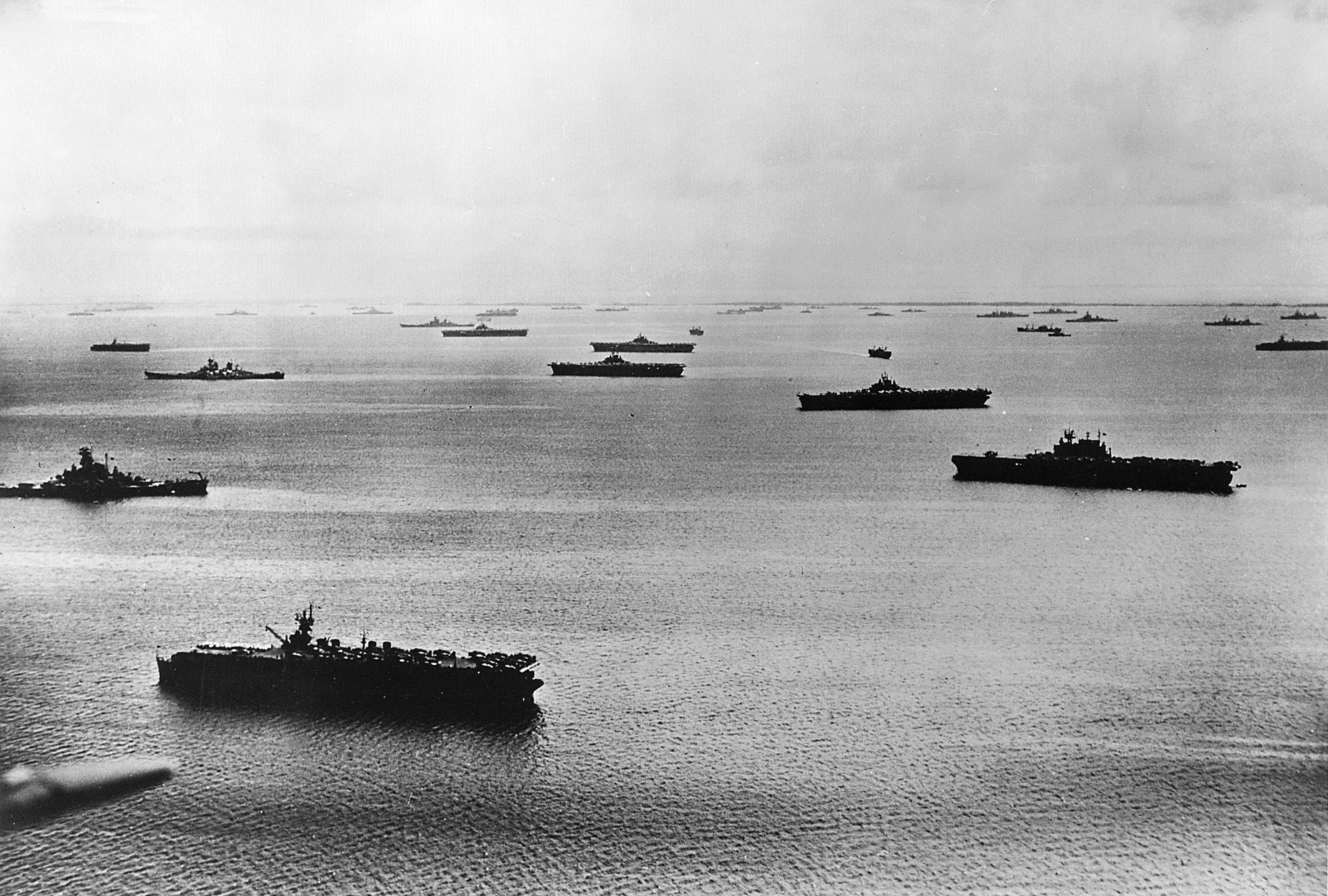
The Fifth Fleet at anchor at Majuro, 1944.

The Marshall Islands were considered the first major stepping stone for the battles across the Central Pacific to Japan. United States Marines were landed on 30 January 1944, but found that Japanese forces had previously evacuated their fortifications to Kwajalein and Enewetak about a year earlier. The islands that made up the Majuro atoll were secured without incident. Majuro had one of the largest natural anchorages in the Pacific. It became the first major forward base for the US Pacific fleet and was the largest and most active port in the world until the war moved westward and Majuro became supplanted by Ulithi.

=== Kwajalein ===
After the capture of Kwajalein in February 1944 Cascade moved from Funafuti to Kwajalein. On 17 March 1944 Squadron 4 was absorbed into Squadron 10. Captain Herbert Meyer Scull was reassigned as chief of staff for Rear Admiral Hoover, Commander Forward Area, Central Pacific. Captain Samuel Ogden in Cascade became representative "A" of Commander Service Squadron 10 in command of Kwajalein and Roi. Cascade remained at Kwajalein until May 1944 when she moved to Eniwetok.

=== Eniwetok ===
The United States captured Eniwetok in a five-day amphibious operation in February 1944. Major combat occurred on Engebi Islet, which was the most important Japanese installation on the atoll. Combat also occurred on the main islet of Eniwetok itself, and on Parry Island, the site of a Japanese seaplane base.

Following its capture, the anchorage at Eniwetok became a major forward naval base for the U.S. Navy. On 5 June Commodore Carter joined ServRon 10 at Eniwetok. His flagship was Prairie. The following ships were also present in July 1944: destroyer tenders Cascade, Piedmont, and Markab; repair ship Hector; repair ship landing craft Egeria; floating drydocks ARD-13, ARD-15; mobile floating drydock AFD-15; and floating workshop YR-30.

During July 1944 there were a large number of vessels present at Eniwetok. The daily average of ships present during the first half of July was 488; during the second half of July the daily average number of ships at Eniwetok was 283. By the end of July Commodore Worrall R. Carter flew to Pearl Harbor to participate in planning the move of Servron 10 facilities from Eniwetok to Ulithi. By this point in the conflict, Commander Service Squadron 10 (ComServRon 10) had several hundred ships and floating equipment under his operational control, and had the largest staff afloat in the Pacific to help administrate responsibilities.

=== Manus ===
On 30 July 1944, representatives of Central Pacific Forces, headed by Commodore A.G. Quynn, met at Naval Base Manus, Admiralty Islands, with representatives of Commander Seventh Fleet, Commander Southwest Pacific Forces, and Naval Base Manus to discuss logistic support of Third Fleet units using Manus as a base in the Western Carolines operation. As a result, Captain S.B. Ogden was ordered to Manus as Commander Service Squadron Ten representative, bringing with him units necessary to service Third Fleet vessels. He left Kwajalein in the Marshalls on Argonne, Commander T.H. Escott, on 21 August and reached Seeadler Harbor on the 27th to set up his mobile base, using Argonne as his flagship.

Commander Third Fleet's logistic plan for Operation STALEMATE II, covering the capture of Peleliu, Ngesebus, Angaur, and Ulithi required that there should be available in Seeadler Harbor one 90,000-ton floating drydock, one 1,000-ton floating drydock, one destroyer tender, one repair ship, two 3,000-ton floating drydocks, and four floating workshops—two for hulls, two for machinery repairs, Besides these, there were added from time to time two destroyer tenders, one repair ship for internal combustion engines, four station tankers, one repair ship, two covered lighters, one water and one fuel oil barge, and two pontoon cranes.

Captain Ogden's responsibility, as Representative "A" of Commander Service Squadron Ten in charge of his Seeadler detachment, was to administer its activities in rendering logistic support. An example was the requirement that 24 oilers be present there for the striking forces, and the further requirement that the Area Petroleum Office of ComServPac effect delivery of 4,150,000 barrels of fuel oil at Manus in equal amounts throughout September. On 20 August 12 oilers left Eniwetok for Seeadler, carrying approximately 1,200,000 barrels of naval special, 84,000 barrels of Diesel oil, and 4,500,000 gallons of aviation gasoline. Commander ServRon Ten at Eniwetok immediately began preparations to send the second contingent of oilers, which left on the 27th and reached Seeadler the 31st. Captain Ogden handled the assignment of the tankers and apportioned delivery of fuel and petroleum products. He similarly administered the supply of fresh and frozen foods, dry provisions, dry stores, ammunition, fresh water, medical items, fleet freight, aviation supplies, and last but not least, repair facilities.

Following Argonne to Seeadler on 27 August were the unclassified vessels Silver Cloud, Caribou, Arethusa, and Armadillo, the water barge YW-90, and the ocean tug Tern towing the concrete barge YO-186. Caribou brought 65,000 barrels of fuel oil, Silver Cloud 85,000 and Arethusa 65,000; Armadillo 24,000 barrels of diesel oil and 1,770,000 gallons of aviation gasoline. YW-90 held 280,000 gallons of water, and the concrete YO-186 55,000 barrels. The fleet tug Tawasa towed in the floating drydock ARD-19, while the auxiliary ocean tug ATA-122 arrived towing the barges YF-681, filled with boatswain's stores of manila and wire line, blocks, tackle, mooring gear, etc., and YF-787 with general stores. Bringing in the drydock also meant bringing her in full, for while being towed from port to port her docking space furnished a wealth of cargo room for all sorts of equipment. On her trip from Eniwetok ARD-19 carried the little harbor tug YTL-208, two pontoon crane barges, 20 LCMs, and 20 LCVPs. Except for the crane barges all these were self-propelled, but none could have made its way across the ocean under its own power. Most of Ogden's detachment was sent down from Kwajalein and Eniwetok. Crane barges, small tugs, and landing craft were vital necessities for supply services within a harbor, and had to go forward.

=== Kossol Roads ===
For resupply in the combat area, the ammunition ships Mauna Loa and Shasta left Seeadler on 15 September for Kossol Passage, Palau Islands, and upon arrival on the 18th immediately began rearming battleships and cruisers of the Naval Gunfire Support Group. On 22 September Lassen also left Seeadler for Kossol, where she issued replacement ammunition to the support group and to Task Force 38.3. Most fire-support ships for STALEMATE were supplied in the Solomons, with the exception of the battleships Mississippi, which had been overhauled and loaded on the west coast, and Maryland, loaded at Pearl Harbor after completion of battle-damage repairs. Naval Base Tulagi reported for August 1944 that the magazine issued 2,600 tons of ammunition to destroyers, cruisers, and battleships, and 500 tons to landing craft. Tennessee, which collided on 23 August with California, was able to join the fire-support group after repair, but California did not leave Espiritu until 18 September.

Rehearsal for Phase I of STALEMATE for fire-support ships was held in the Cape Esperance area, Guadalcanal, 27 to 29 August. Sangay, with 2,936 tons of ammunition, arrived there from the west coast on 6 September, accompanied the group to the objective, and during the early hours of D-day, 15 September, lay off Peleliu Island ready to make issues. She remained in the vicinity until afternoon of the 21st, when she went to Kossol Passage, joining Mauna Loa and Shasta. Next day the three were joined by Lassen, and all four issued replacement ammunition to retiring vessels. By the 27th, 66 ships of various types were in Kossol Passage. Because of the total lack of anchorages in the vicinity of Angaur and Peleliu, Kossol proved a roadstead where ships could await call to unload at Peleliu, and also where replenishment of fuel, stores, and ammunition was accomplished. It was used extensively through October and November 1944 as a staging area en route from New Morotai (Operation INTERLUDE); ammunition was supplied at a number of bases in the area, and from 5 ammunition ships which visited Hollandia and Woendi during August and September.

Captain C.C. Laws, commanding the repair ship Prometheus, on 3 October became the Kossol Passage Representative of Service Squadron Ten.

=== Ulithi ===
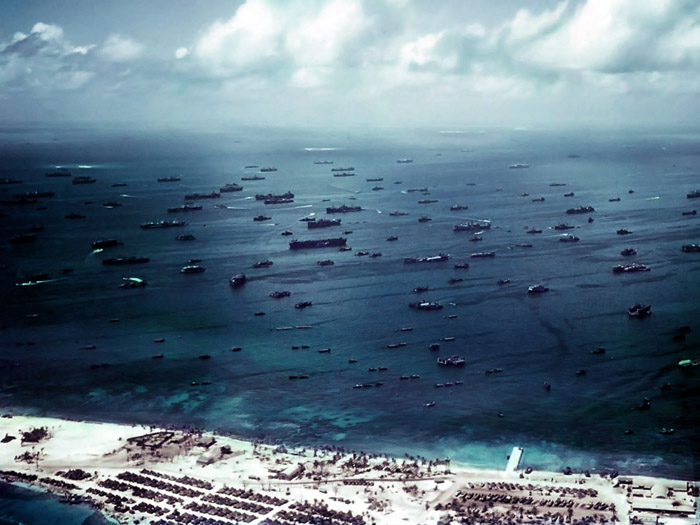
With Sorlen island in the foreground, Third Fleet vessels crowd the north anchorage at Ulitih in late 1944.

Ulithi was perfectly positioned to act as a staging area for the US Navy's western Pacific operations. The atoll is in the westernmost of the Caroline Islands, 360 miles (580 km) southwest of Guam, 850 miles (1,370 km) east of the Philippines and 1,300 miles (2,100 km) south of Tokyo. It is a typical volcanic atoll, with a coral reef, white sand beaches and palm trees. Ulithi's forty small islands barely rise above the sea, with the largest being only half a square mile in area. However, the reef runs roughly 20 miles (32 km) north and south by 10 miles (16 km) across, enclosing a vast anchorage with an average depth of 80 to 100 feet (24 to 30 m). The anchorage was well situated, but there were no port facilities to repair ships or re-supply the fleet.

The survey ship Sumner surveyed the lagoon and reported it capable of holding 700 vessels. Service Squadron 10 was called upon to convert the lagoon into a serviceable naval station. On 4 October 1944 the vessels of Service Squadron 10 began leaving Eniwetok for Ulithi.

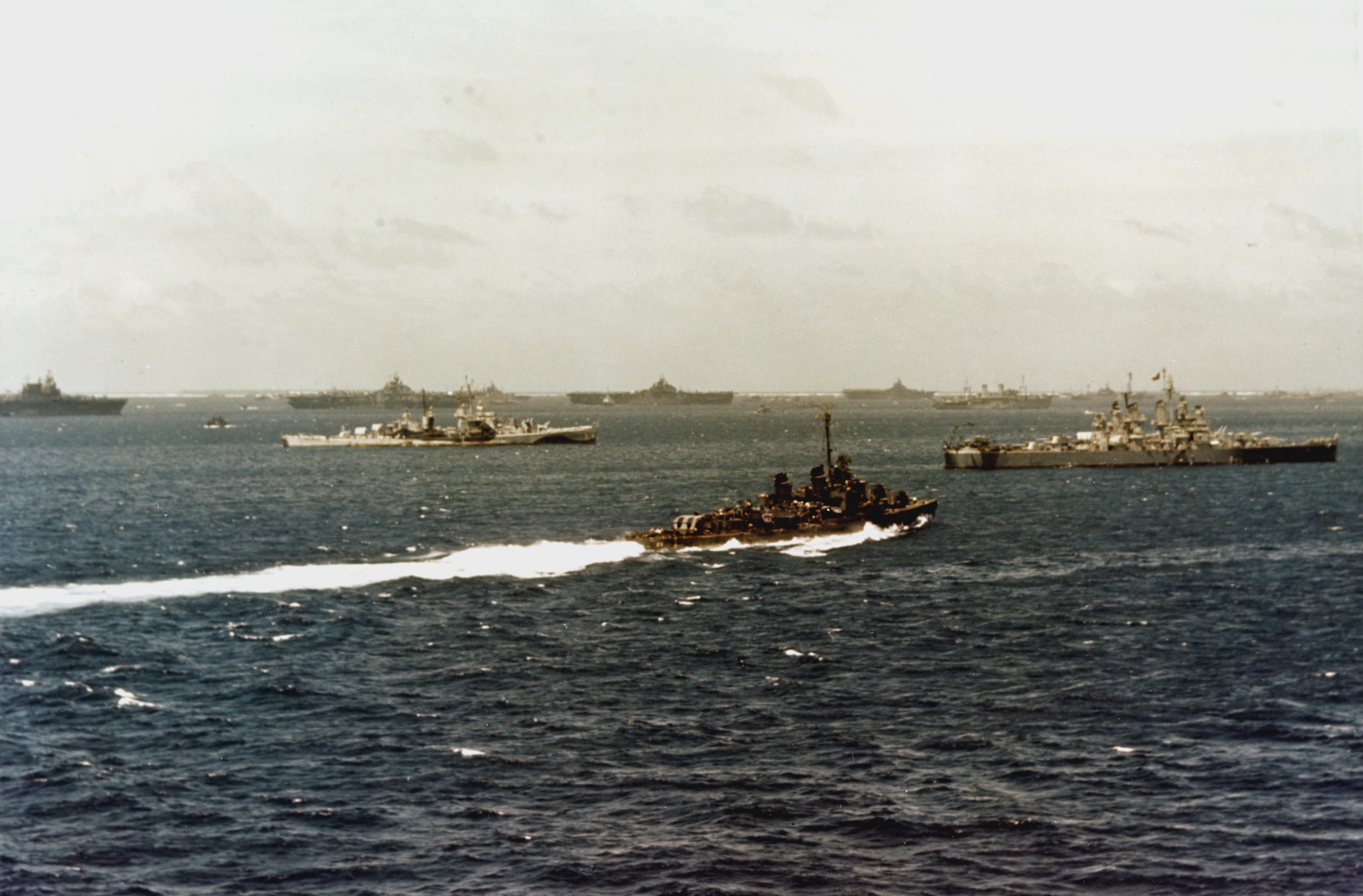
U.S. naval forces including several Essex class carriers at anchor in Ulithi March 1945.

At Ulithi pontoon piers of a new design were built, each consisting of the 4-by-12-pontoon sections, filled with sand and gravel, and then sunk. The pontoons were anchored in place by guy ropes to deadmen on shore, and by iron rods driven into the coral. Connecting tie pieces ran across the tops of the pontoons to hold them together into a pier. Despite extremely heavy weather on several occasions these pontoon piers stood up remarkably well. They gave extensive service, with little requirement for repairs. Piers of this type were also installed by the 51st Battalion to be used as aviation-gasoline mooring piers near the main airfield on Falalop.

On 8 October 1944 Commodore Worrall R. Carter's flagship Prairie, the merchant ammunition ship Plymouth Victory and Cascade sailed for Ulithi. Markab initially remained at Eniwetok, leaving for Ulithi on 18 October 1944 and arriving on 22 October.

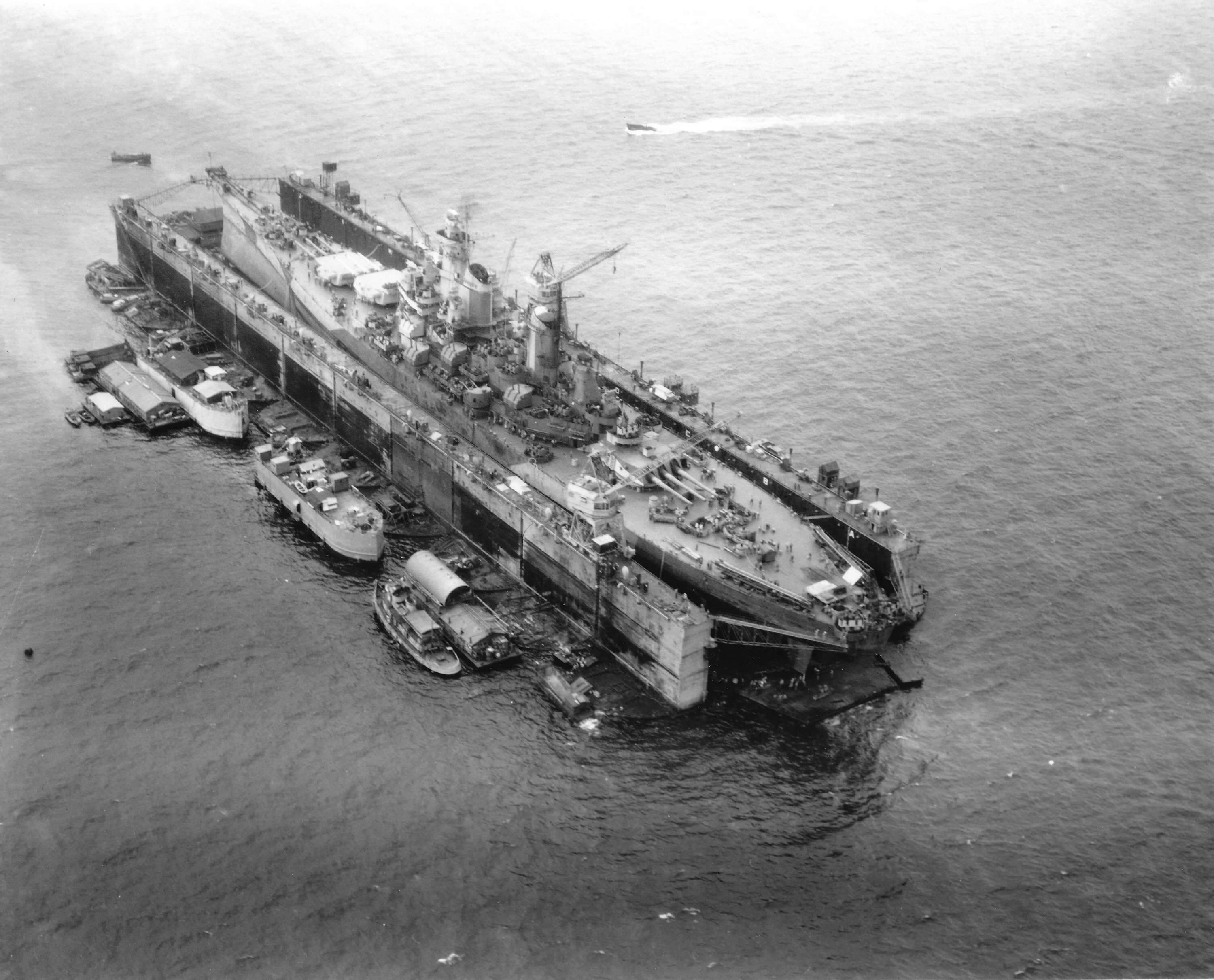
USS ABSD-2 repairing the Iowa at a floating drydock at Manus in December 1945.

Within a month of the occupation of Ulithi, a whole floating base was in operation. Six thousand ship fitters, artificers, welders, carpenters, and electricians arrived aboard repair ships, destroyer tenders, and floating dry docks. Ajax had an air-conditioned optical shop and a metal fabrication shop with a supply of base metals from which she could make any alloy to form any part needed. Abatan, which looked like a big tanker, distilled fresh water and baked bread and pies. The ice cream barge made 500 gallons a shift. The dry docks towed to Ulithi were large enough to lift dry a 45,000-ton battleship. Fleet oilers sortied to and from Ulithi to meet the task forces at sea, refueling the warships a short distance from their combat operational areas. The result was something never seen before: a vast floating service station enabling the entire Pacific fleet to operate indefinitely at unprecedented distances from its mainland bases. Service Squadron 10's conversion of the lagoon at Ulithi to a major naval resupply and staging area was one of the most remarkable feats of the war. In terms of the number of ships at one base, Naval Base Ulithi was the largest Naval Base in the world in 1944 and 1945, with over 617 ships at times.

Ulithi became the undisclosed Pacific base for the major operations late in the war, including Leyte Gulf and the Okinawa operation. The huge anchorage capacity was greater than either Majuro or Pearl Harbor, and over seven hundred ships anchored there at a time. After Leyte Gulf was secured, the Pacific Fleet moved its forward staging area to Leyte at Leyte-Samar Naval Base.

In September 1944 Ocelot arrived at Pearl Harbor to undergo conversion to flagship for Service Squadron 10. The ship was fitted with extensive radio and visual signaling equipment, with radio and coding rooms in the superstructure, and berths for the squadron commander, staff officers, and enlisted men below. The conversion was completed in October, and Ocelot sailed via Eniwetok for Ulithi where she spent the next six months providing an administrative post at the advanced base.

=== San Pedro Bay, Leyte ===
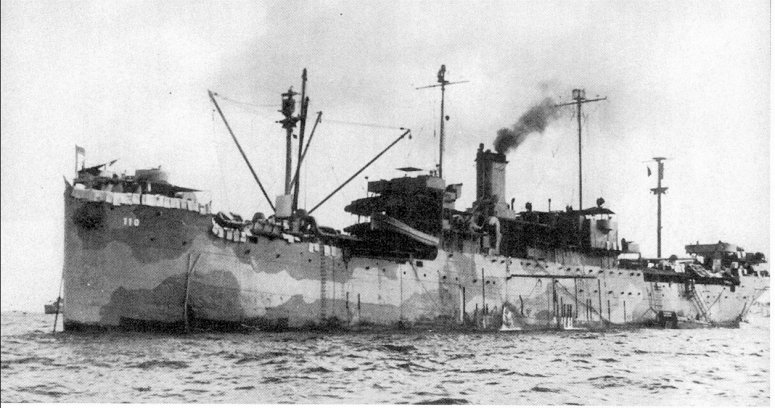
USS Ocelot, Service Squadron 10 flag.

The movement of American forces closer to victory necessitated advancing support elements as well, and on 24 May 1945 Ocelot shifted to San Pedro Bay, Leyte.

The logistic work of Service Squadron Ten at Leyte should perhaps be briefly explained. While that was an area under the cognizance of the Seventh Fleet, which at that time did not come under the direct command of Admiral Nimitz, it was nevertheless a matter of brothers-in-arms cooperation to give support wherever possible. Therefore, because of shortage of the necessary service vessels in the Service Force Seventh Fleet, a detachment of Service Squadron Ten was sent to Leyte to help out. In this detachment was a floating drydock of 3,500 tons and another smaller one, as the shore-base development planned for the area was not far enough advanced to meet the requirements. Later, when the Third and Fifth Fleets based there, Service Squadron Ten moved in with a large detachment to take care of the logistics without drawing upon the shore base for anything except the occasional use of the battleship drydock at Samar.

Nearly all ships of the Southern Attack Force and the Western Islands Attack Group for the Okinawa operation assembled and loaded at Leyte. Initial plans designated Commander Service Force Seventh Fleet as the responsible service agency, and Commander Amphibious Group Twelve as responsible logistically for servicing the ships of the Joint Expeditionary Force staging at Leyte. When it became apparent that Seventh Fleet could not supply the needs of this force, Commander Service Squadron Ten's Representative A, Captain Ogden, was ordered from Kossol Roads to provide services for Nimitz's ships in the area. ComServFor Seventh Fleet provided additional services as requested by Captain Ogden.

Arriving 15 February 1945 in Argonne, Captain Ogden reported to Rear Admiral J.L. Hall Jr., commanding Amphibious Group Twelve. Pending arrival of additional service-force units, conferences were held to obtain an overall grasp of the problems involved. It was determined that sufficient quantities of everything required were either available or could be made so at Leyte. All ships had to be provisioned before the training and rehearsal period, and topped off just before departure to the objective. Schedules were interrupted by foul weather and the late arrival of some of the ships from Iwo Jima. The distances from troop embarkation points to the logistic anchorage, 15 to 30 miles, added to the problem.

Maintenance facilities available to staging forces were the destroyer tenders Dixie and Markab; one limited repair ship, Argonne; two repair ships, the Hector and Prometheus; one internal-combustion-engine repair ship; and two floating drydocks. Two landing-craft repair ships, Egeria and Endymion, which were assigned to the amphibious group, were available after 1 March. Because of the limited time in which to accomplish essential repairs and the length of time required to load ships, it was decided to place one repair ship in each of the two loading areas so that a maximum of work could be accomplished prior to departure. Work on small craft was undertaken by three of the other repair ships.

The total number of ships to be serviced at Leyte was 432, some—ships newly reporting from the United States—needing little attention, others considerable, especially amphibious craft returning from Iwo Jima. Of the floating drydocks, both brought forward from Kossol, ARD-16 was unavailable for the staging work because it contained the battle-damaged destroyer Renshaw. Consequently, ARD-17 carried most of this type of work, with Seventh Fleet facilities used on several occasions. To complete what would normally be the necessary drydock work every available diver was used. Because of experience gained with many small ships in this staging, a definite need was indicated of having small drydocks of 1,000 tons and pontoon docks to reinforce the 3,500-ton ARDs.

=== Saipan ===
At Saipan in addition to the floating facilities of Squadron Ten there was a tank farm for 150,000 barrels of black oil, 30,000 of diesel, and 900,000 gallons of aviation gasoline, a supply depot of 64 steel warehouses 40 by 100 feet (12 m × 30 m) each, plus 11 refrigerator units of 640 cubic feet (18 m^{3}) each. The naval ammunition depot had 112 steel magazines, 4 torpedo magazines, and considerable open storage. An amphibious-vessel repair base comprised five shops 40 × 100 feet each in floor space, a 12-ton crane on a pontoon barge, a 6 × 18 pontoon drydock, and additional fuel storage of four 10,000-barrel diesel tanks and two 1,000 barrel tanks for aviation gasoline. A small-boat repair unit with 4 × 15 pontoon drydock had a mobile machine shop. There was also a special small-boat pool and an LVT repair facility run by the amphibious force, two 75-ton cranes on 6 × 18 pontoon lighters, and a pier for handling ammunition between ship and shore.

=== Buckner Bay, Okinawa ===
On 13 September Ocelot moved westward again, to Buckner Bay, Okinawa as the forward supply followed the course of the conflict finally to the home waters of Japan. Shortly after arrival there the facilities were struck by Typhoon Louise and a number of vessels were lost. Ocelot was forced aground and her back was broken. Command was shifted to another vessel and the job of keeping the navy supplied continued.

== War in Europe/the Atlantic ==
Although ServRons working in the Atlantic and Mediterranean were, at the start of the war, organized along the same lines as those in the Pacific, the nature of the war there was very different. There were few undeveloped areas in this theater, meaning that most advance base development involved repairing/ refurbishing existing ports.

== Marine Service Squadron ==
From early 1942 onward, the Marine Corps, whose air establishment was rapidly being expanded, began to organize its aviation squadrons into air groups, each organized along the same lines as a Navy carrier air group. Within each Marine Air Group a "Headquarters and Service Squadron" was initially established, to manage and support the combat squadrons; however, from roughly July 1942 onward these were divided into separate "Headquarters" and "Service" Squadrons, the latter (known, as with Navy Service Force units, as Servrons) serving as repair elements for the front-line squadrons, along the lines of the Navy's Carrier Aircraft Service Units (CASUs), which were starting to appear around the same time.

Marine Service Squadron (SMS), were operated by the United States Marine Corps. Marine Aircraft Group 93 (MAG-93). Marine Service Squadron was aviation group established during World War II and serviced in the Korean war also. In November 1942, Marine Service Squadron 25 (SMS-25) was activated to provide maintenance for the group. Marine Service Squadron 33, SMS-33, operated in the Korean war. Marine Aviation Logistics Squadron 11 became Service Squadron on 1 September 1924.

== Post-war ==
The wartime Service Squadrons were dissolved in mid-1945, their duties passed on to non-squadron commands within Service Force. By 1947, however, a new ServRon 1, responsible for the full range of forward-area support functions, was established in the Pacific, as well as a new ServRon 2 in the Atlantic. These only operated a handful of ships, and functioned much as the Train Squadrons of the inter-war period had. Later additional new Service Squadrons were organized--3, in the Pacific; 4, in the Atlantic; 6, in the Mediterranean; 9, as a submarine chaser division, based at Pearl Harbor; and 10, working with the United States Eighth Fleet in the Atlantic. Service Squadron 9 was formed on Pearl Harbor as a submarine chaser division. Service Squadron 6 operated in the Mediterranean Sea. These squadrons were slowly disbanded in the late 1970s as fleet combat support functions were shifted to civilian-operated Military Sealift Command.

== See also ==
- ComServPac
- List of unclassified miscellaneous vessels of the United States Navy - many vessels used by service squadrons held this hull classification
- Special Service Squadron
