= Longnecker =

Longnecker is a surname of Swiss German origin. It is an alternate spelling of Langenecker, a habitational name for a person from any of several places called Langeneck, a name derived from Old High German lang, which means "long", and egga, which means "corner".

There are many spelling variations, most commonly Longenecker, Longaker, Longenencker, Langnecker, Longacker and Langenecker, and Lonnecker.

As a surname, Longnecker may refer to:

== People ==
- Henry Clay Longnecker, member of the U.S. House of Representatives
- G. William Longenecker, Executive Director and co-creator of the Arboretum at the University of Wisconsin-Madison
- Richard Longenecker, American Biblical Scholar
- Bruce Longenecker

== Fictional characters ==
- Mervin Longnecker, chief petty officer in Let's Go Navy!
- Longnecker, character in Listen to Me
- Longnecker, character in No Deposit, No Return
- Miss Longnecker, character in O. Henry's The Skylight Room
