= Olbrich Botanical Gardens =

Botanical garden in Madison, Wisconsin, US

Coordinates: 43°5′33″N 89°20′6″W

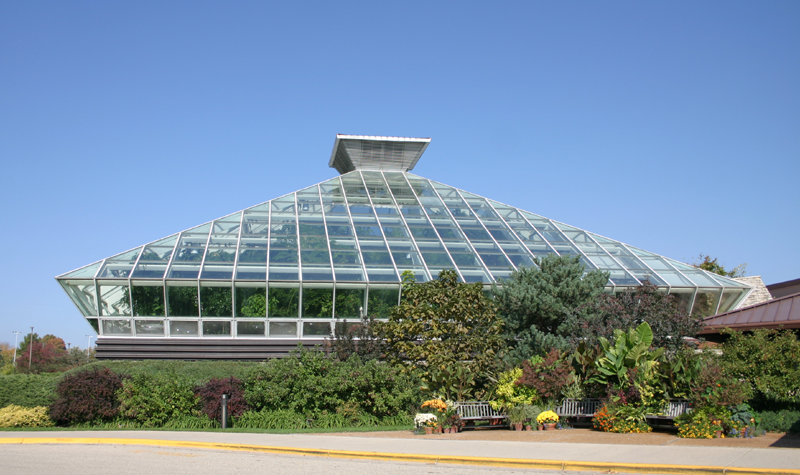
- Bolz Conservatory
- Interactive map of Olbrich Botanical Gardens
- Type: Botanical garden, Conservatory
- Location: Madison, Wisconsin
- Area: 16 acres (6.5 ha)
- Website: www.olbrich.org

Olbrich Botanical Gardens is a 16-acre outdoor botanical garden and 10,000-square-foot conservatory in Madison, Wisconsin. Founded in 1952 and named for its founder, Michael Olbrich, the gardens are owned and operated jointly by the City of Madison Parks and the non-profit Olbrich Botanical Society.

Noteworthy additions to the gardens were the Bolz Conservatory in 1991, and a Thai sala, a gift to the University of Wisconsin–Madison from the Thai Chapter of the Wisconsin Alumni Association and the government of Thailand through its king, Bhumibol Adulyadej. Opened in 2002, it is one of only six sala outside of Thailand and one of two in the United States (the other is located in Hawaii).

== Gardens and grounds ==
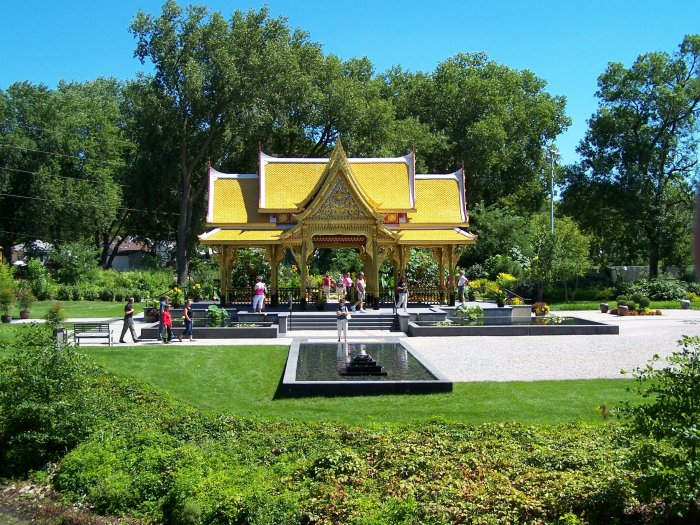
Thai sala

The gardens are made up of several separate areas. The Sunken Garden is in the form of a traditional English garden. Surrounded by limestone terraces and hedges, it contains an 80-foot (24 m) long reflecting pool – designed to connect the garden thematically with nearby Lake Monona.

The Thai Garden contains the sala, which is joined to the gardens by a 155-foot (47 m) arched footbridge crossing Starkweather Creek. This garden has a shallow reflecting pool near the pavilion and is filled with small examples of Thai sculpture. The plants in this garden were carefully selected to give a tropical appearance to the garden in the summer, while choosing plants capable of surviving Wisconsin winters.

A Rock Garden is constructed of a rocky hill, designed to simulate a mountain slope. Plants here are mostly conifers or alpine and two streams flow through it, forming a waterfall and small pond. Here again, a wooden footbridge crosses the stream.

A Meadow Garden combines perennial grasses, wildflowers, and plants grown from bulbs. The grass in the meadow garden is mowed only once or twice a year. The small Wildflower Garden contains wildflowers, ferns, berries, and native trees and shrubs. An Herb Garden is a collection of smaller gardens of herbs separated by use; they include medicinal, dye, and kitchen (spice) herbs, as well as 'touch' and 'smell' gardens. A perennial garden displays perennials and three ponds, with a waterfall. Aquatic plants are displayed in the ponds.

The Rose Garden is an ongoing project featuring more than 700 varieties and 125 rose cultivars, including hybrid teas, floribundas, grandifloras, and hardy shrub roses.

The Starkweather Creek and Atrium Shade Gardens features a semicircular atrium and plants such as astilbes, hostas, lungwort, bishops' caps, and ferns. The Eunice Fisher Hosta Garden features hostas hybridized by Wisconsin native Eunice Fisher.

== Bolz Conservatory ==
The Bolz Conservatory is a 10,000-square-foot greenhouse housing over 750 plants representing over 70 families and over 550 different species and cultivars. The plants are native to tropical and sub-tropical regions. The structure itself is a glass pyramid measuring 100 by 100 ft (30 by 30 m) and rising to 50 ft (12 m) at the apex. The temperature is maintained between 65 and 80 degrees Fahrenheit (between 18 and 26 °C), although the sun may warm it to 100 °F (35 °C) in the summer. The relative humidity is maintained at 70% or above.

In addition to the tropical plants, the conservatory is home to species of birds including canaries, waxbills and quail. There is also a koi pond, featuring koi and goldfish.

While admission to Olbrich Botanical Gardens is free, a small fee is charged for entry into the conservatory. Daily hours are 10am-6pm.

== Gallery ==
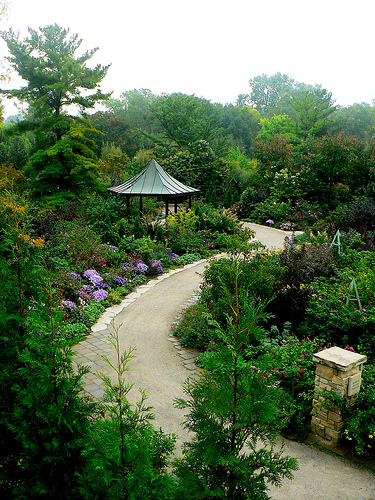
Rose Garden from the tower

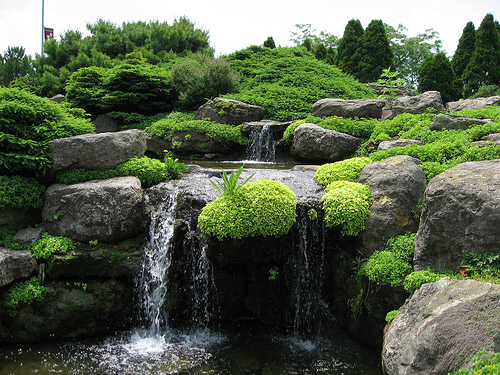
Rock Garden waterfall

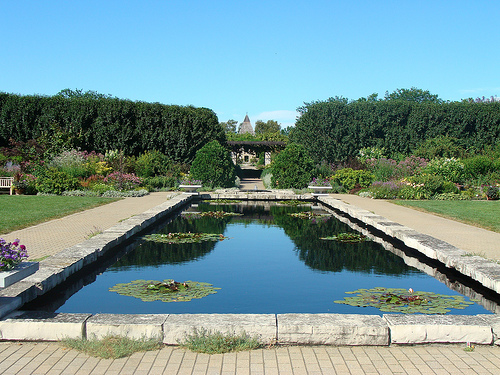
Sunken Garden with the top of the Rose Tower visible in the distance

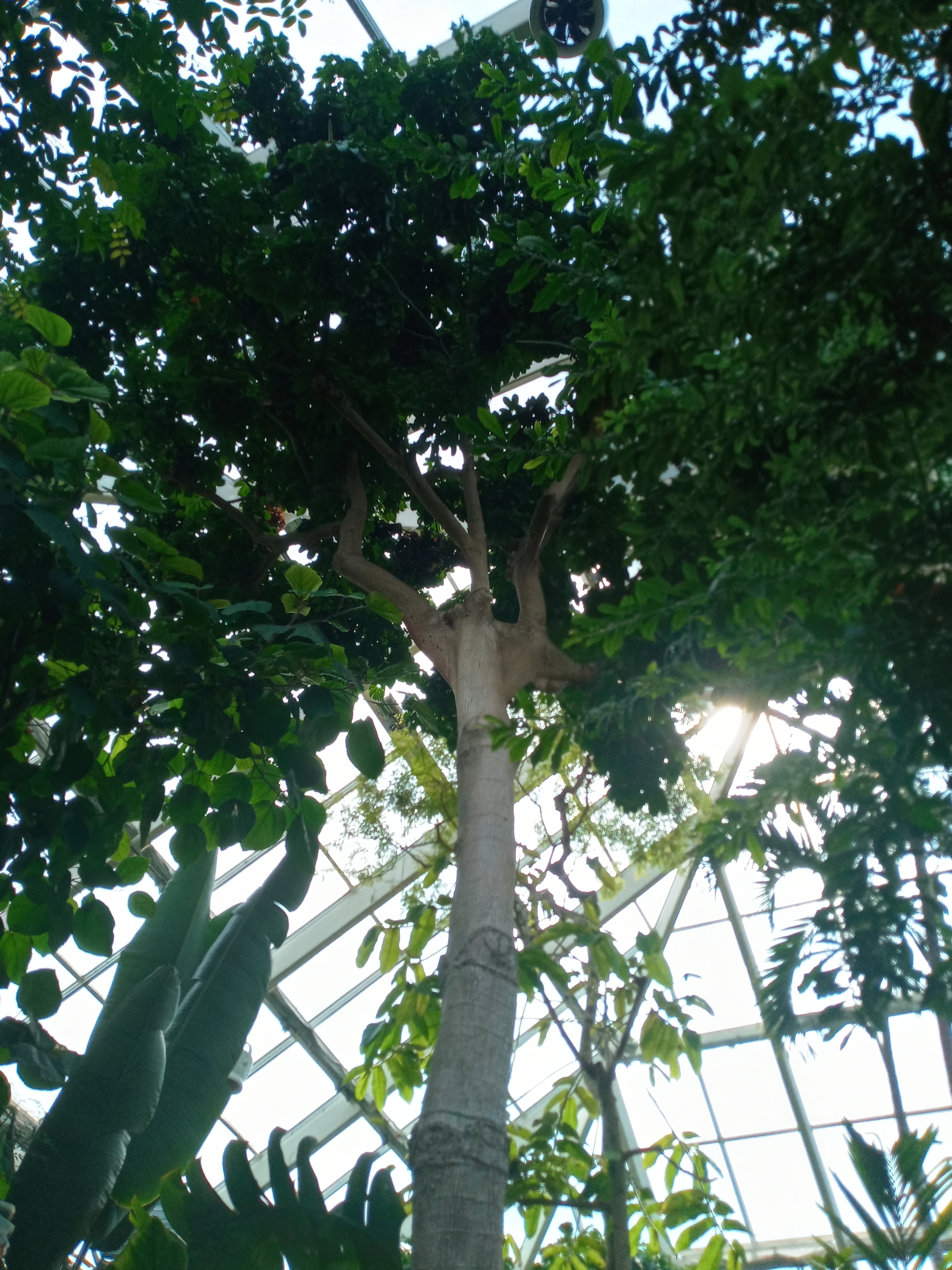
Pachira aquatica (Guyana chestnut) in the Bolz Conservatory

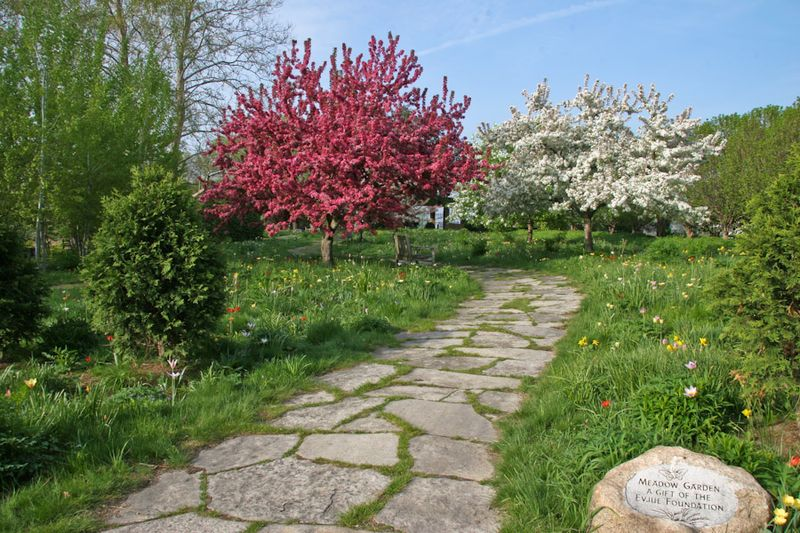
Meadow Garden

== See also ==
- List of botanical gardens and arboretums in Wisconsin
