= Longneck =

Longneck can refer to:

- "Longneck Bottle", a song written by Steve Wariner and Rick Carnes
- Longneck eel
- Long Neck, Delaware, United States
- A design of beer bottle
- a term for Apatosaurus or similarly structured dinosaurs
- Longneck, a Canada goose in the 2024 animated film The Wild Robot, voiced by Bill Nighy

== See also ==
- Long Neck Karen, or Kayan people of Myanmar
- Longnecker, a surname
