= Nest box =

Man-made enclosure for animals to nest in

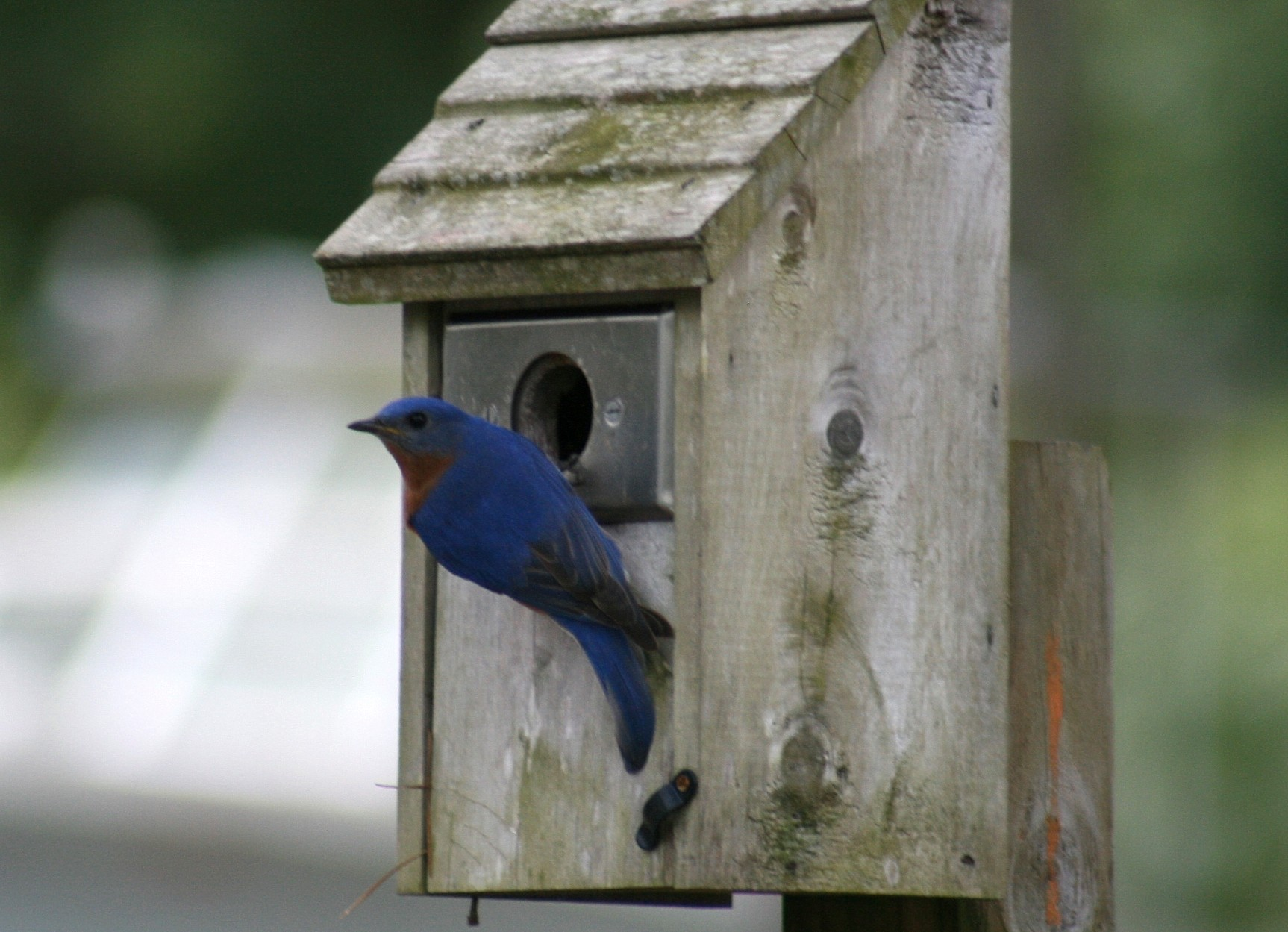
Eastern bluebird at the entrance of a nest box

A nest box, also spelled nestbox, is a man-made enclosure provided for animals to nest in. Nest boxes are most frequently utilized for birds, in which case they are also called birdhouses or a birdbox/bird box, but some mammals such as bats may also use them. Placing nestboxes or roosting boxes may also be used to help maintain populations of particular species in an area.

Nest boxes were used since Roman times to capture birds for meat. The use of nest boxes for other purposes began in the mid-18th century, and naturalist August von Berlepsch was the first to produce nest boxes on a commercial scale.

Nest boxes are getting more attention because increasing industrialization, urban growth, modern construction methods, deforestation and other human activities since the mid-20th century have caused severe declines in birds' natural habitats, introducing hurdles to breeding. Nest boxes can help prevent bird extinction, as it was shown in the case of scarlet macaws in the Peruvian Amazon.

== Construction ==
=== General construction ===
Nest boxes are usually wooden, although the purple martin will nest in metal. Some boxes are made from a mixture of wood and concrete, called woodcrete. Ceramic and plastic nestboxes are not suitable.

Nest boxes should be made from untreated wood with an overhanging, sloped roof, a recessed floor, drainage and ventilation holes, a way to access the interior for monitoring and cleaning, and have no outside perches which could assist predators. Boxes may either have an entrance hole or be open-fronted. Some nest boxes can be highly decorated and complex, sometimes mimicking human houses or other structures. They may also contain nest box cameras so that use of, and activity within, the box can be monitored.

=== Bird nest box construction ===
The diameter of the opening in a nest-box has a very strong influence on the species of birds that will use the box. Many small birds select boxes with a hole only just large enough for an adult bird to pass through. This may be an adaptation to prevent other birds from raiding it. In European countries, an opening of 2.5 cm in diameter will attract Poecile palustris, Poecile montanus; an opening of 2.8 cm in diameter will attract Ficedula hypoleuca, and an opening of 3 cm in diameter will attract Parus major, Passer montanus, an opening of 3.2 cm in diameter will attract Passer domesticus.

The size of the nest box also affects the bird species likely to use the box. Very small boxes attract wrens and treecreepers and very large ones may attract ducks and owls. Seasonally removing old nest material and parasites is important if they are to be successfully re-used.

The material used in the construction may also be significant. Sparrows have been shown to prefer woodcrete boxes rather than wooden ones. Birds nesting in woodcrete sites had earlier clutches, a shorter incubation period, and more reproductive success, perhaps because the synthetic nests were warmer than their wooden counterparts.

Placement of the nest box is also significant. Some birds (including birds of prey) prefer their nest box to be at a particular height, while others (such as ducks) may prefer them to be very low or even at ground level. Orientation relative to the sun is also important, with many birds preferring their boxes to be away from direct sun and sheltered from the prevailing rain.

=== Bat box construction ===
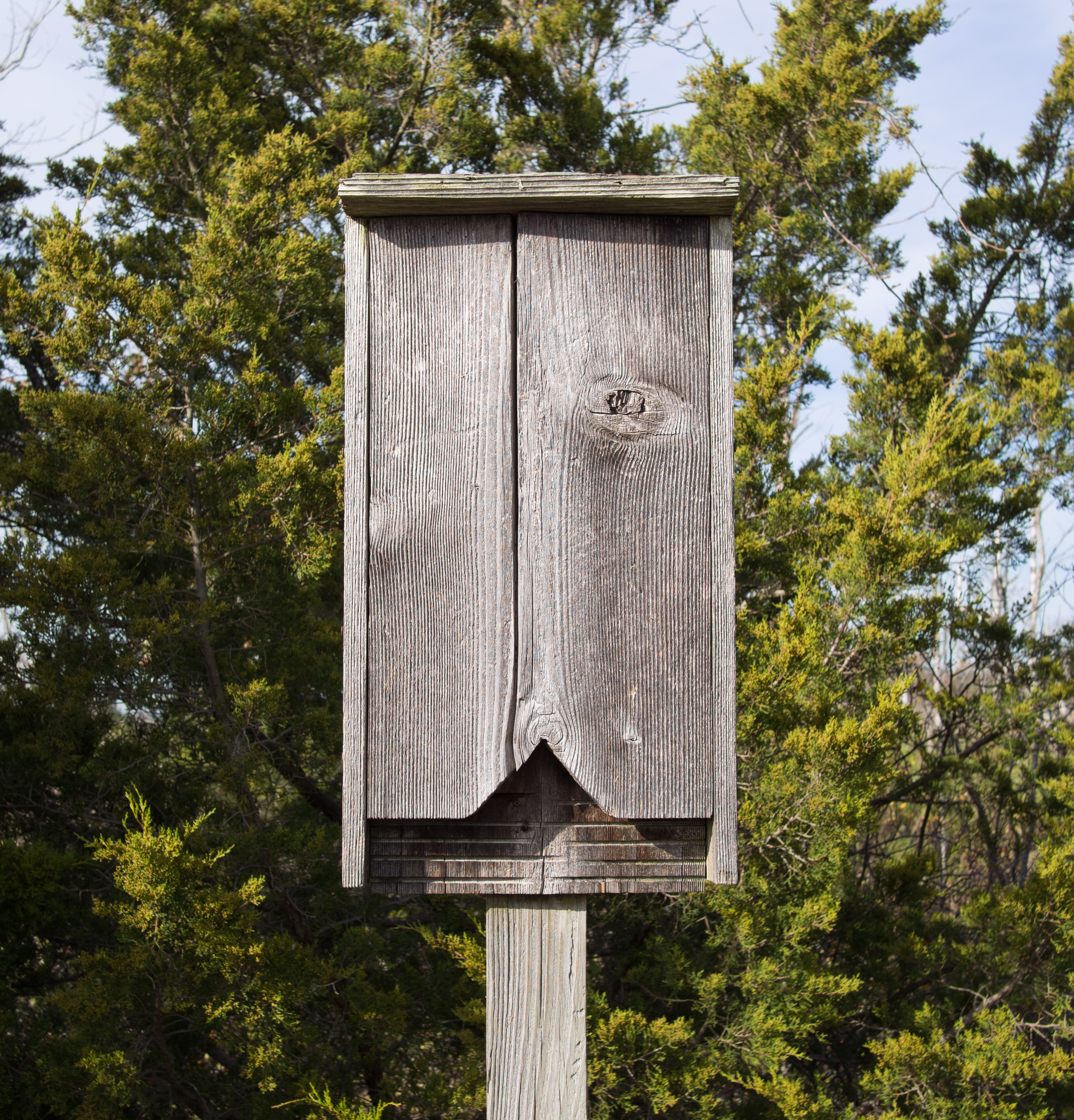
A typical bat box affixed to a post

Bat boxes differ from bird nest-boxes in typical design, with the larger opening on the underside of the box, and are more often referred to as bat boxes, although in regard to the rearing of young, they serve the same purpose. Some threatened bat species can be locally supported with the provision of appropriately placed bat-boxes; however, species that roost in foliage or large cavities will not use bat boxes. Bat boxes are typically made out of wood, and there are several designs for boxes with single or multiple chambers. Directions for making the open bottom bat houses for small and large colonies, as well as locations to purchase them are available on the internet. Colour and placement are important to ensuring that bat boxes are used; bat boxes that are too shaded will not heat up enough to attract a maternity colony of bats. Australian bat box projects have been running for over 12 years in particular at the Organ Pipes National Park. Currently there are 42 roost boxes using the "Stebbings Design" which have peaked at 280 bats roosting in them. The biggest problem with roosting boxes of any kind is the ongoing maintenance; problems include boxes falling down, wood deteriorating, and pests such as ants, the occasional rat, possums, and spiders.

== Other animals ==
Nest boxes are marketed not only for birds, but also for butterflies and mammals, especially arboreal ones such as squirrels and opossums. Depending on the animal, these boxes may be used for roosting, breeding, or both, or, as in the case with butterflies, hibernation.

Wasps, bumble-bees, or other insects may build their nests inside a nest box intended for other animals, and may exclude the intended species.

== Gallery ==
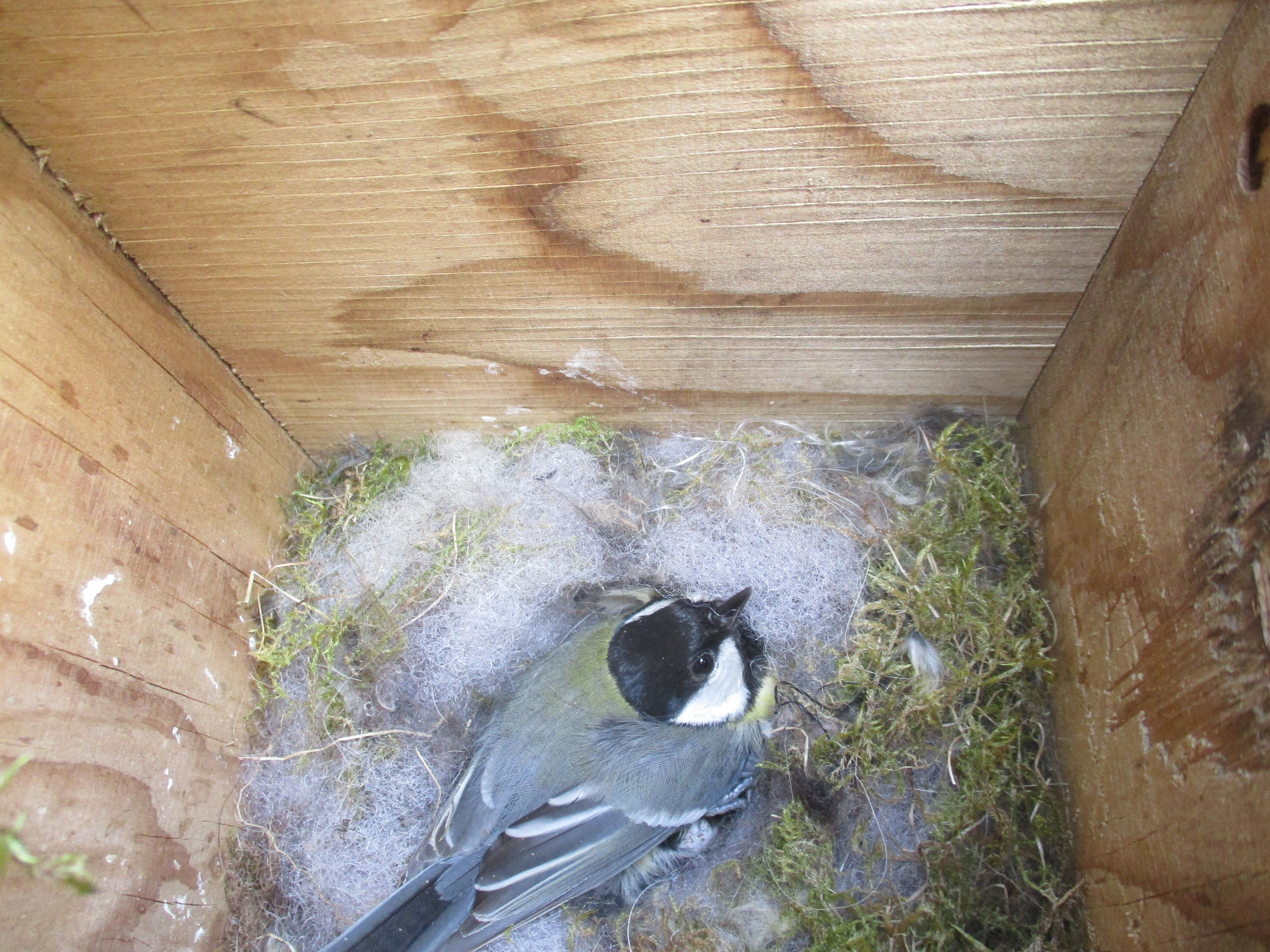
Great tit nesting in a nest box

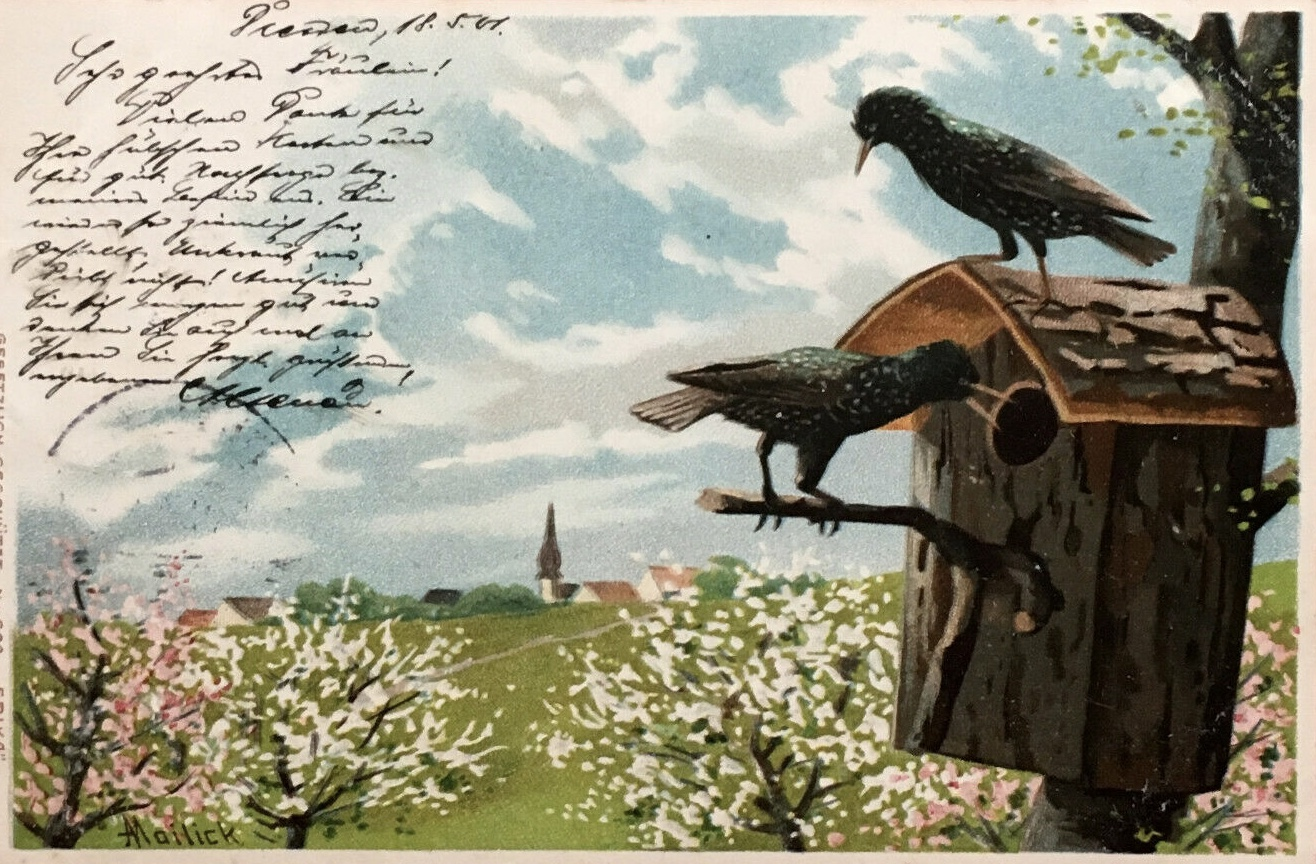
Bird box by Alfred Mailick, 1901

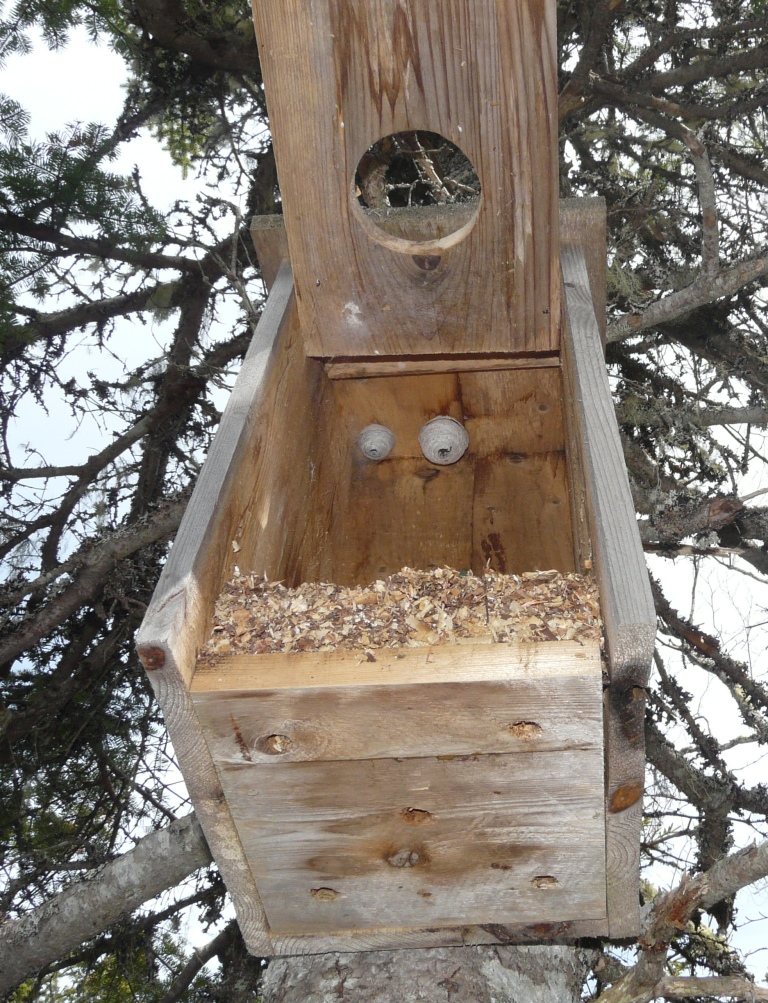
Two wasp nests inside a nest box set for boreal owls

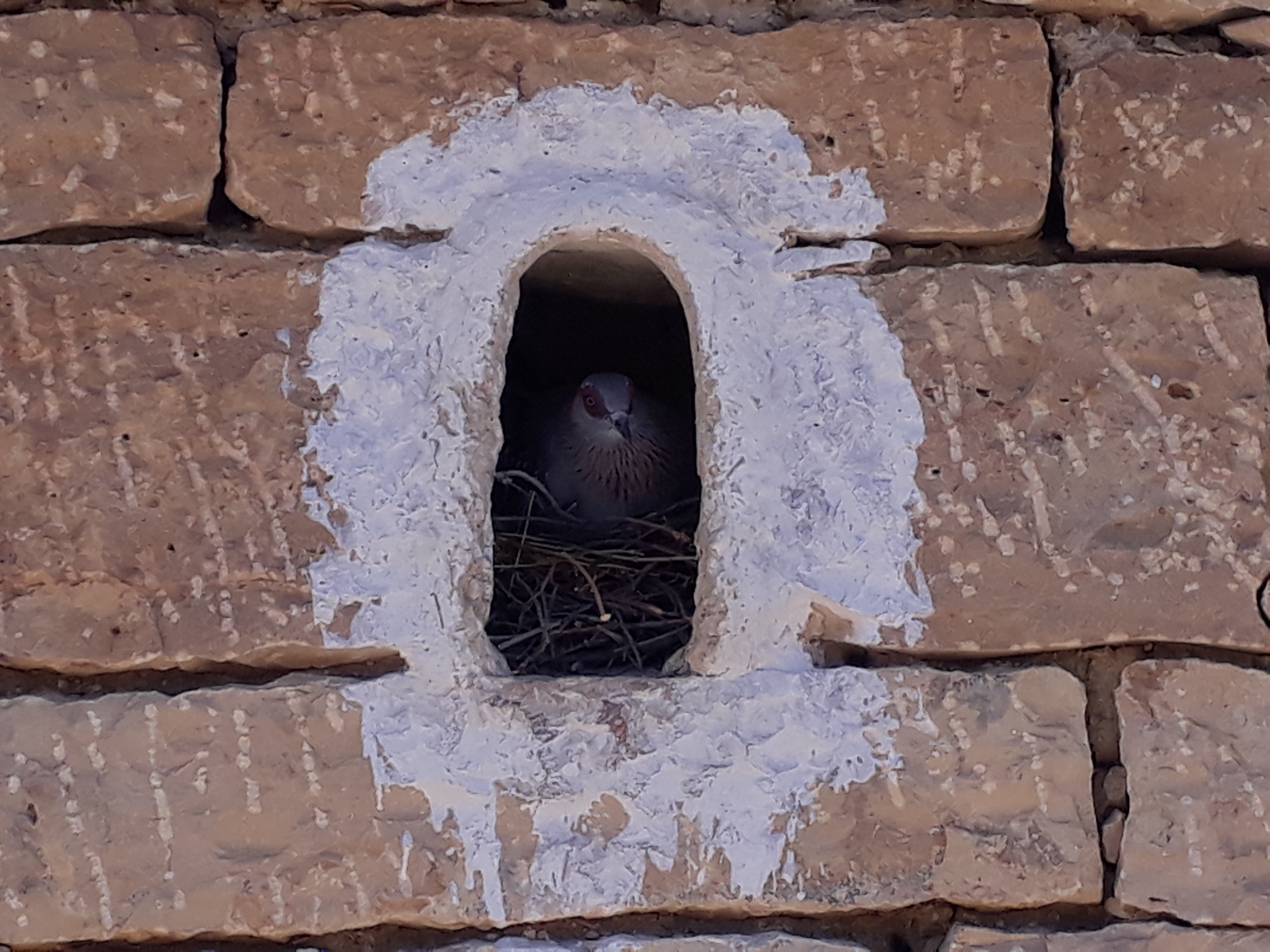
Traditional nest box for Columba guinea in the wall of a homestead in Zerfenti (Ethiopia)

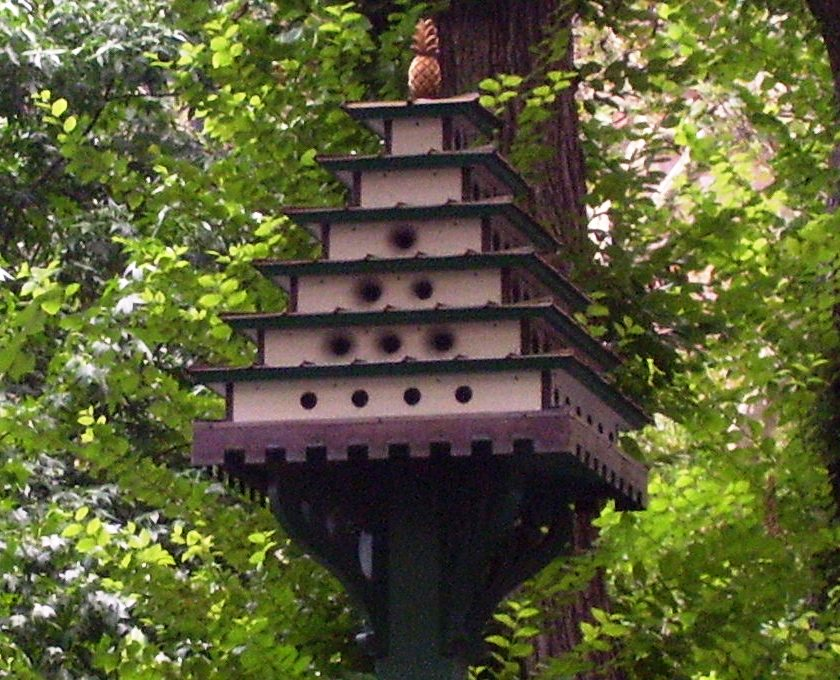
Birdhouses in Gramercy Park, New York City, note the use of different diameter entrance holes

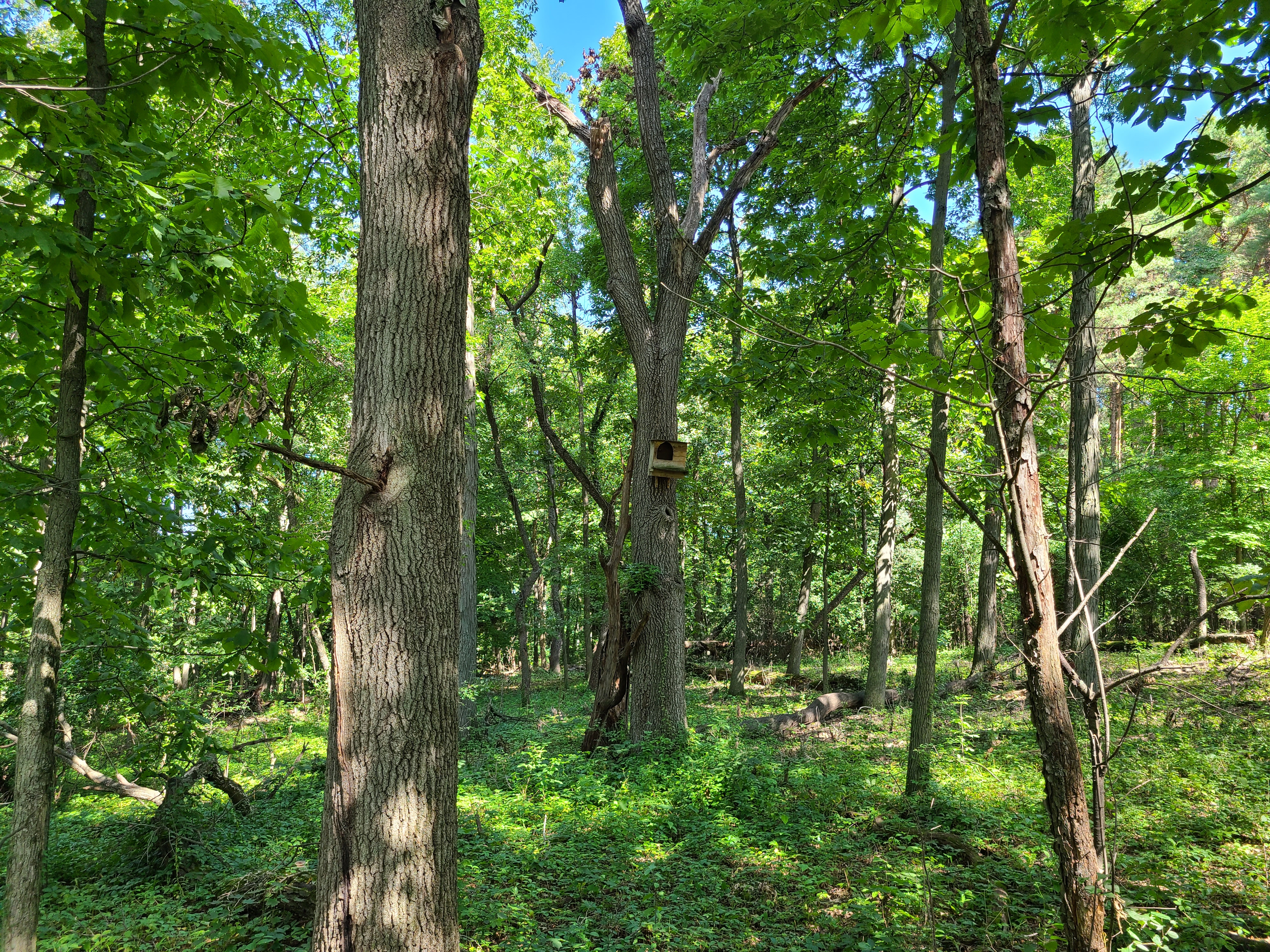
Nest Box at the University of Wisconsin–Madison Arboretum

== See also ==
- Artificial bird nests
- Biological pest control: birds can help controlling pests in agriculture; section also details the planting of food crops for birds
