= Sala (Thai architecture) =

Open pavilion

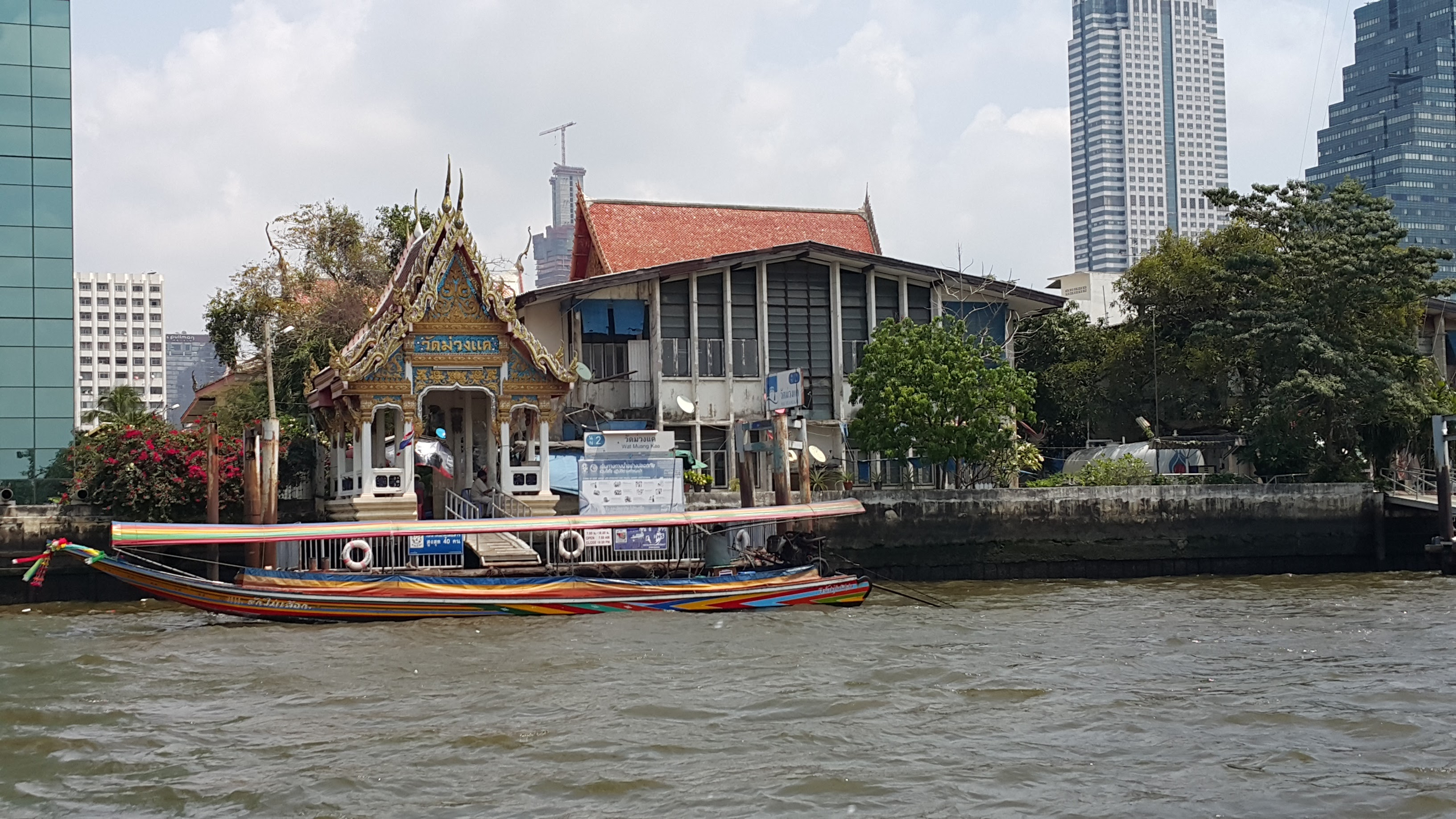
Wat Muang Khae Pier built in Sala Thai manner by the Chao Phraya River

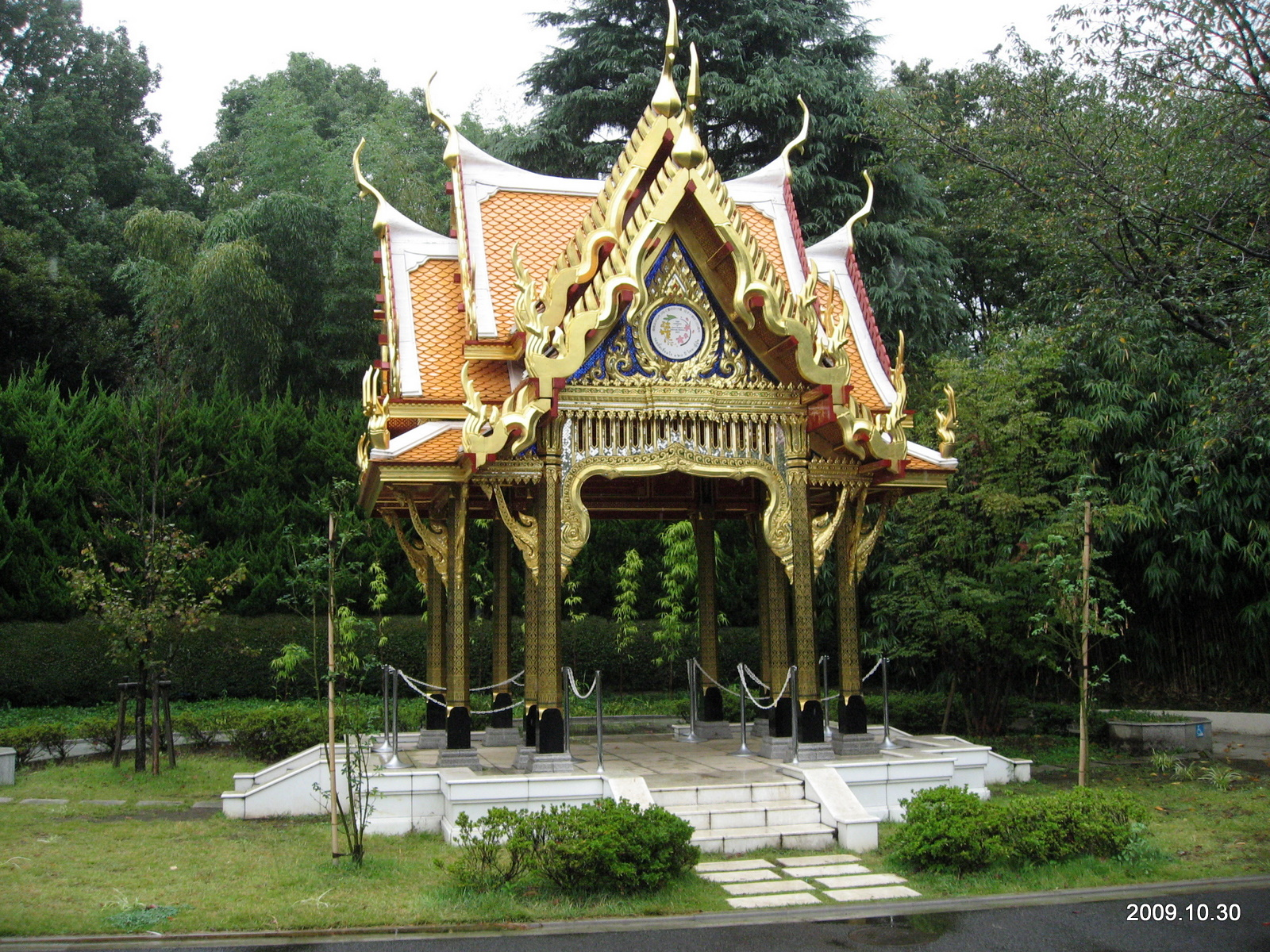
A Sala Thai given by the Thai government at Ueno Zoo, Tokyo

A sala (Thai: ศาลา [sǎːlaː]), also known as a Sala Thai, is an open pavilion, used as a meeting place and to give people shade. With etymological roots in the Sanskrit sala, the word in Thai connotes buildings for specific purposes, such as sala klang ('provincial hall'). Most are open on all four sides. They are found throughout Thailand in Buddhist temple areas, or wats, although they can also be at other places. A person who builds a sala at a temple or in a public place gains religious merit. A sala located in a temple is called a salawat (ศาลาวัด) Some temples have large salas where laity can hear sermons or receive religious instruction. These are called sala kan parian (ศาลาการเปรียญ), meaning 'pavilion where monks learn for the Parian examination'. The city halls or offices of the province governors are called sala wa kan (ศาลาว่าการ, literally meaning 'government pavilion') or sala klang changwat (ศาลากลางจังหวัด, literally meaning a 'provincial main pavilion').

In Thailand, they have many purposes similar to the roadside pavilions of Asoka. In rural areas, travelers can use them to rest and reflect. These salas are called sala asai. One at the roadside is a sala rim thanon (ศาลาริมถนน) and may be used as a bus stop. If on a riverbank or canal at a landing-place for watercraft, they are called sala tha nam (ศาลาท่าน้ำ 'water pier pavilions').

== Etymology ==
The term "sala" earliest known mention is found in Atharvaveda, which is an Indian Hindu text written in sanskrit language, which has been dated to 1200 BC to 1000 BC. "Sala" in Atharvaveda and later in various Indian languages denotes "house" in a broad and generic sense, with meanings such as "stall" for cattle, "shed" for corn, room or house, etc. The owner or the head of the house is called the "sala-pati" in Atharvaveda. Term "sala" is a cognate of Hindi शाल, meaning hall, large room or shed.

== Salas outside Thailand ==
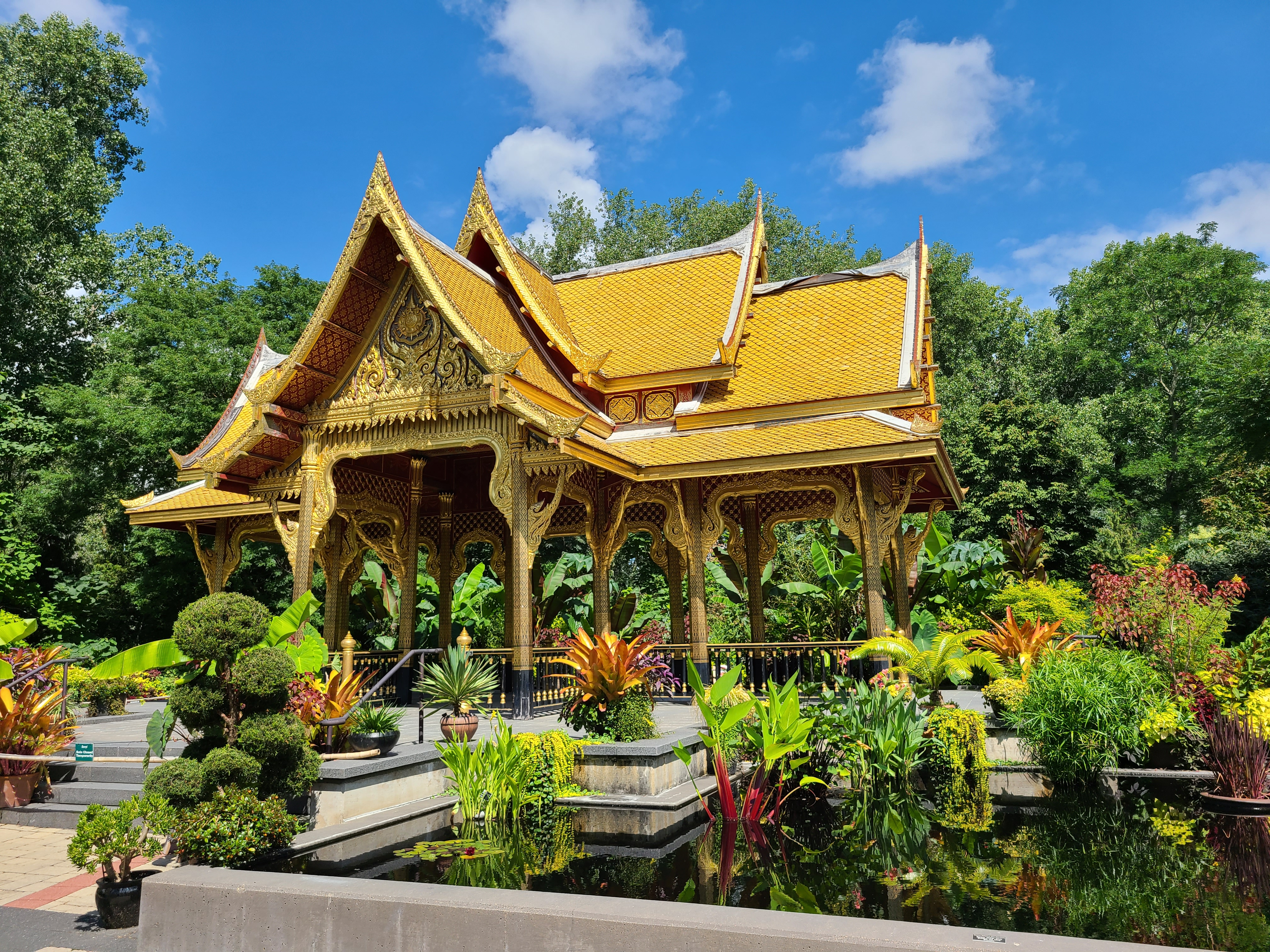
Thai sala at Olbrich Botanical Gardens

- Olbrich Botanical Gardens, Madison, Wisconsin, United States
- East–West Center, Honolulu, Hawaii, United States
- Ueno Zoological Gardens, Tokyo, Japan
- Parc du Denantou, Lausanne, Switzerland
- Kurpark, Bad Homburg v.d.H, Germany
- Westpark, Munich, Germany

== See also ==
- Architecture of Thailand
- Ordination hall
- Zayat, the Burmese equivalent
