= Nest box camera =

Photographic device

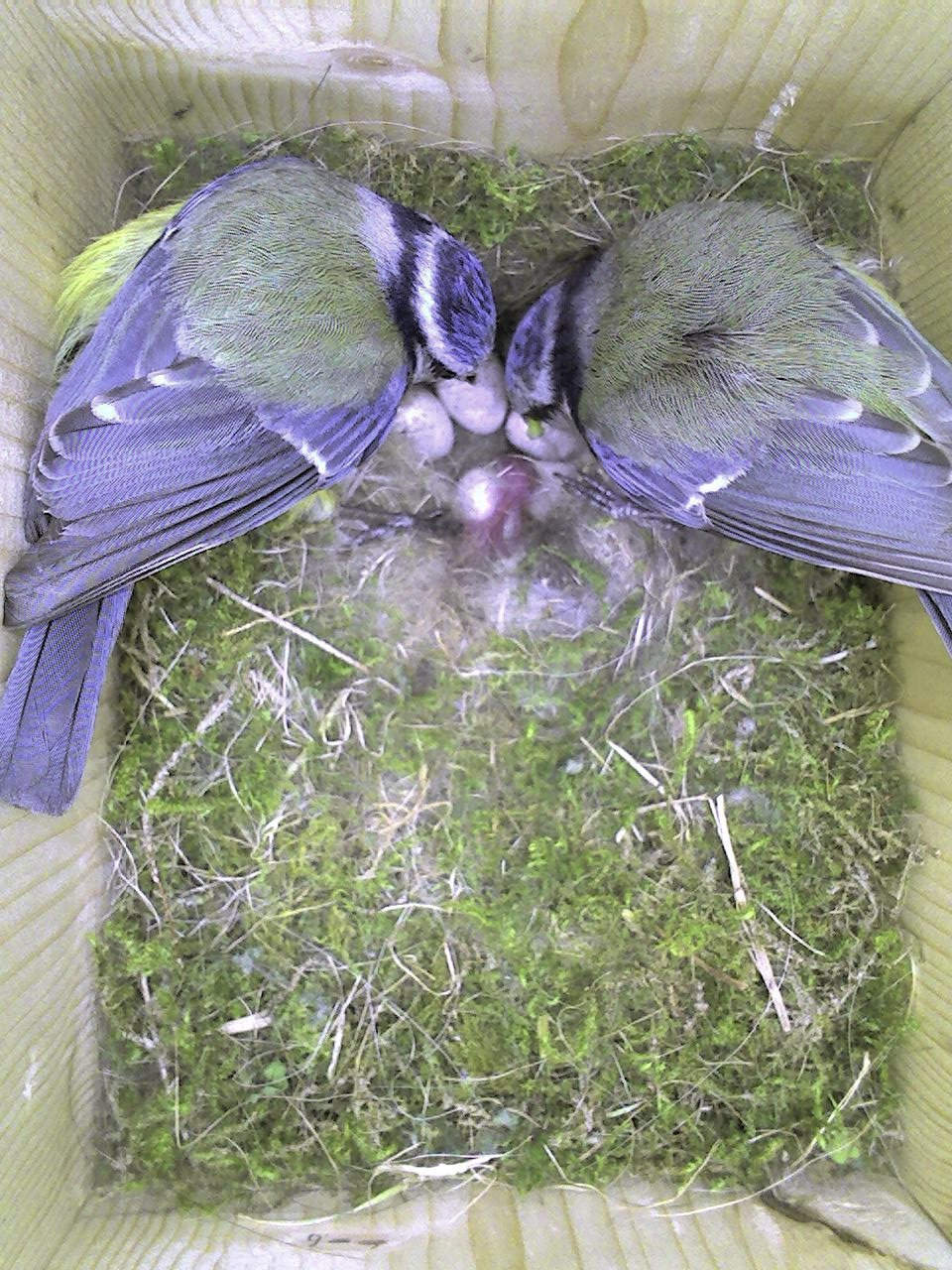
An image of a Blue Tit nest from a nest box camera

A nest box camera, also known as a bird box camera, is a photographic device fitted inside a nest box in order to monitor its inhabitants. Many Internet sites broadcast video streams and still images of nesting birds in real time.

== Technology ==
Most cameras uses visible light to capture images. Infrared cameras may be used alone or in conjunction with visible light cameras if the birds are active at night. Infrared light is not dangerous to nesting birds. Wired and wireless systems are used. A webcam is frequently used by enthusiasts but the quality is usually standard-definition. Wired network cameras allow the streaming of high-definition video to the internet or to internal or external storage. Some nest box cameras have microphones inside them. It is relatively easy to construct a nest box camera because it involves little more than installing a camera in a nest box, remembering only to choose or construct a nest box large enough to contain the camera, to have a box deep enough to enable proper focusing of the camera and to use a camera suitable for outdoor conditions.
