= Michael Olbrich =

American lawyer

Michael Olbrich (September 29, 1881 – October 10, 1929) was a Madison, Wisconsin, lawyer, politician, and conservationist, who founded Olbrich Botanical Gardens and the University of Wisconsin-Madison Arboretum.

== Biography ==
Olbrich was born Michael Balthasar Olbrich in Chemung, Illinois in 1881. He graduated from the University of Wisconsin-Madison in 1902, where he was a member of the debate team.

A noted enthusiast of nature, Olbrich founded what is now known as Olbrich Botanical Gardens in Madison, Wisconsin. The Olbrich Gateway at the University of Wisconsin-Madison Arboretum is also named for him.

Olbrich was involved in a court case over a Montana sheep ranch in which he had invested much of his money, which led to his suicide in 1929.

== Career ==
Olbrich was chairman of the Republican Party of Wisconsin in 1912. Later, he served as deputy attorney general of Wisconsin from 1919 to 1921. He was a member of the law firm of Olbrich and Siebecker.
