= Longenecker =

Longenecker is a surname. Notable people with the surname include:

- Bob Longenecker (1909–2002), American talent agent and television producer
- Herbert E. Longenecker (1912-2010), eleventh president of Tulane University
- Joel Minnick Longenecker (1847–1906), American statesman
- John Longenecker (born 1947), American film producer
- Richard Longenecker, New Testament scholar
- G. William (Bill) Longenecker, (1899-1969), American landscape architect and academic
- George W Longenecker, Founder of the West Virginia Botanic Garden
- Martha Longenecker
