= West Virginia Botanic Garden =

Botanical garden in Morgantown, West Virginia

Coordinates: 39°37′45″N 79°52′05″W

- Interactive map of West Virginia Botanic Garden
- Type: Botanical garden
- Location: Morgantown, West Virginia
- Area: 85 acres (34 ha)
- Website: www.wvbg.org

The West Virginia Botanic Garden is a botanical garden located in Morgantown, West Virginia, and is the only botanical garden in the state of West Virginia. It covers approximately 85 acres of land and 4.5 miles of walking trails, and has 8 gardens. It is situated near Cheat Lake, and the Tibbs Run Reservoir, which was used as a water source for Morgantown before 1969. The reservoir basin was drained in 1980 and is now grown over with plants.

== History ==
The garden was founded in 1983 by George Longenecker, a professor at West Virginia University, and a group of volunteers. The city leased the site for the garden in 1999, and the garden has since been maintained by volunteer work. In 2023, the garden was updated to include repaved roads and trails, as well as new signage, boardwalks, and a section showcasing various fossils. A visitor's centre is planned to be installed sometime in 2024.
