= University of Wisconsin–Madison Arboretum =

National Historic Landmark

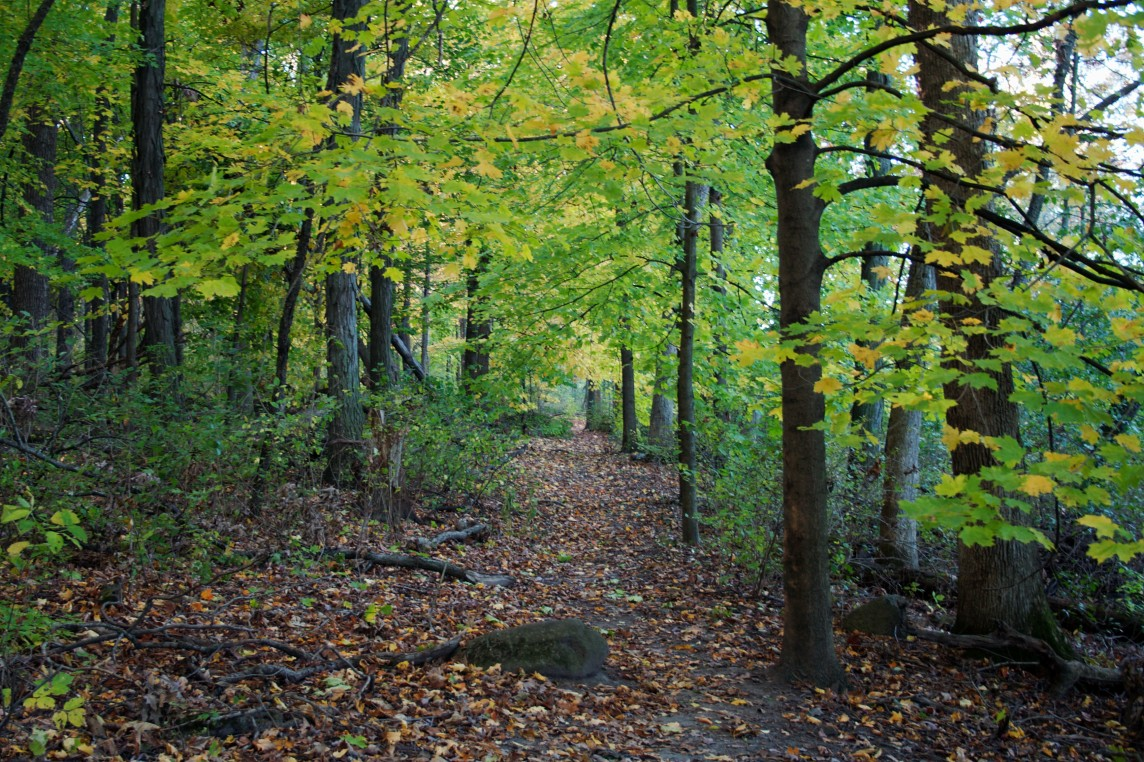
- University of Wisconsin–Madison Arboretum
- Interactive map of University of Wisconsin–Madison Arboretum
- Type: Arboretum
- Location: 1207 Seminole Hwy., Madison, Wisconsin
- Coordinates: 43.041425°N 89.430652°W
- Area: 1,260 acres (510 ha)
- Created: April 26, 1932
- Operator: University of Wisconsin–Madison
- Website: arboretum.wisc.edu
- University of Wisconsin–Madison Arboretum
- U.S. National Register of Historic Places
- U.S. National Historic Landmark
- NRHP reference No.: 16000518; 100006237 (NHL)

Significant dates
- Added to NRHP: January 29, 2019
- Designated NHL: January 31, 2021

The University of Wisconsin–Madison Arboretum is a teaching and research facility of the University of Wisconsin–Madison and the site of historic research in ecological restoration. In addition to its 1,200 acres (5 km^{2}) in Madison, Wisconsin (located about four miles from the main campus of the University of Wisconsin–Madison), the Arboretum also manages 520 acres (210 ha) of remnant forests and prairies throughout Wisconsin. It was designated a National Historic Landmark in 2021, in recognition for its role as a pioneer in the field of ecological restoration.

== History ==
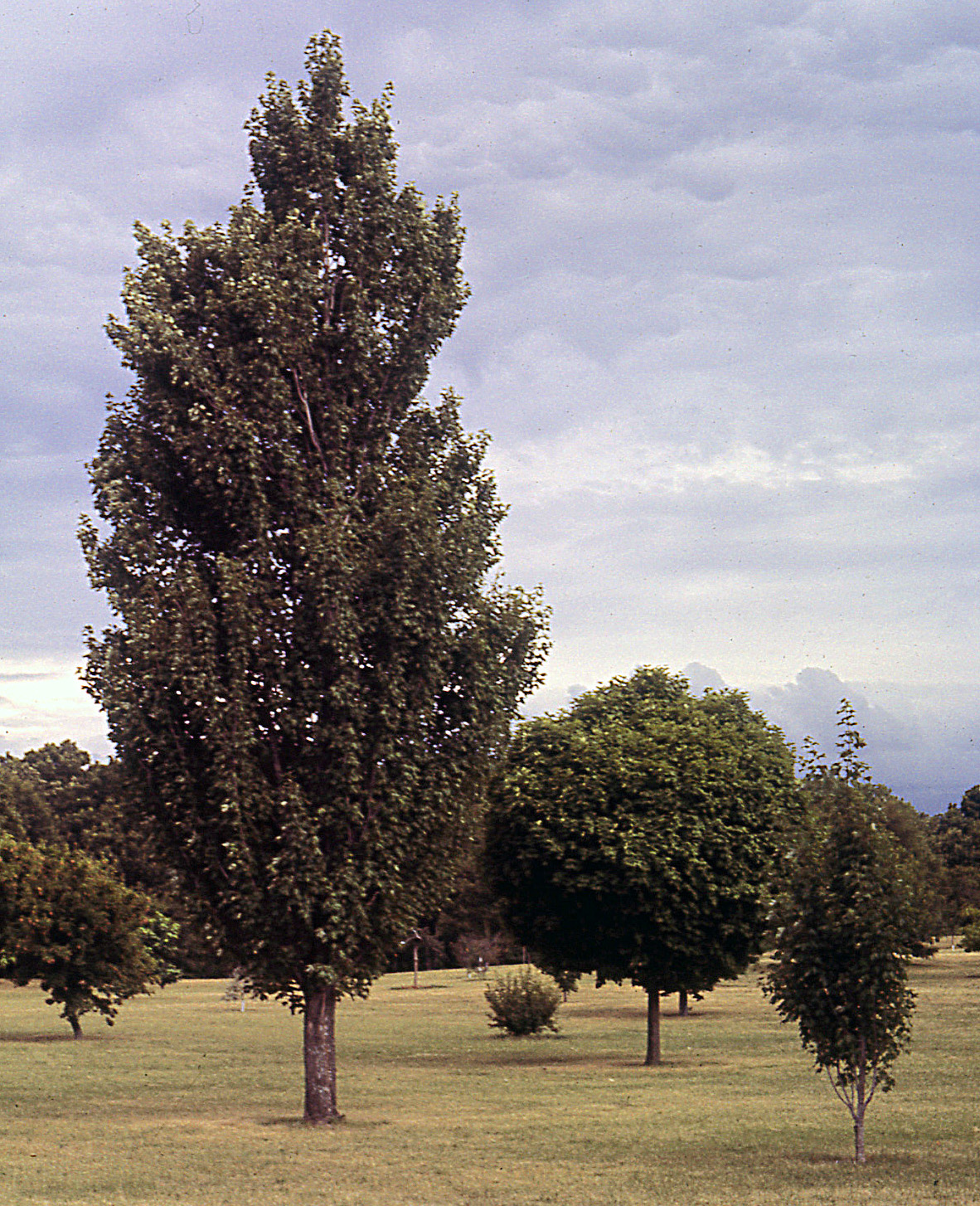
Acer rubrum 'Armstrong', Acer saccharum 'Globosum', and Acer ginnala in Horticultural collections (1987)

In 1911, landscape architect John Nolen proposed an arboretum for Madison based on Boston's Arnold Arboretum. In 1922 Michael Olbrich and the Madison Parks Foundation began working to acquire land on the southwest shore of Lake Wingra. The UW Arboretum was founded on April 26, 1932, when the University Board of Regents accepted from the Parks Foundation the deeds to 6 parcels totalling 246 acres of land, creating the "University of Wisconsin Forest Preserve Arboretum and Wildlife Refuge". The acreage at the time was mostly farmland fields and pastures.

In 1932, G. William Longenecker was hired by the Board of Regents to work with the Arboretum and be on the Arboretum Committee, which was formed by Ed Gilbert. In 1933, Longenecker was named Arboretum Executive Director, and he served in this capacity until he retired in 1967. Longenecker Horticultural Gardens would be named after him in 1967, and a stone bench placed, honoring his 34 years of service as the Arboretum's Executive Director. He was also the first Head of the University of Wisconsin Landscape Architecture Department.

Aldo Leopold was named Research Director of the Arboretum in 1933 and also was the first professor of game management in the U.S. He was also the first chair of the Department of Game Management at the University of Wisconsin. Leopold and other members of the first Arboretum Committee, especially Professor Norman C. Fassett of the Botany Department, proposed a research agenda around re-establishing "original Wisconsin" landscape and plant communities, particularly those that predated European settlement, such as tallgrass prairie and oak savanna.

Between 1935 and 1941, crews from the Civilian Conservation Corps provided most of the labor to accomplish this task under the supervision of Ted Sperry, an ecologist and prairie plant root specialist who had studied with Arthur G. Vestal at the University of Illinois. Such work would eventually become known as ecological restoration. Some of the first tall-grass prairie restorations in the United States took place at the Arboretum. In 2020, Curtis Pond was rehabilitated, and an invasive prairie plant was removed.

In addition to its long-standing commitment to ecological restoration, the Arboretum also features traditional horticultural collections of labeled plants arranged in garden-like displays.

Today the Arboretum manages the oldest restored tall grass prairie in the nation along with an extensive collection of restored ecosystems that are referred to as "ecological communities": woodlands, savannas, prairies, wetlands, springs, and the Lake Wingra shoreline.

In 1994, Ed Hasselkus became the volunteer curator for the Longenecker Horticultural Gardens. In 2022, Ed and Betty Hasselkus endowed the curator position for the Longenecker Horticultural Gardens. In July, the curator position was named the Ed Hasselkus curator of the Longenecker Horticultural Gardens

== Prairies and savannas ==
More than 300 species of native plants that once dominated the landscape of southern Wisconsin have been restored to the arboretum's prairies and savannas.

- Curtis Prairie (60 acres (24 ha)) – described as the world's oldest restored prairie; a tallgrass prairie with big bluestem grass and Indian grass.
- Greene Prairie (50 acres (20 ha)) – planted by prairie expert Henry Greene during the 1940s and 1950s.
- Marion Dunn Prairie (4 acres (1.6 ha)) – restoration of a settling pond.
- Marsh Connection – transition between Curtis Prairie and wetlands.
- Sinaiko Overlook Prairie (5 acres (2.0 ha)) – mesic to dry-mesic prairie dominated by Indian grass.
- Southwest Grady Oak Savanna – southern Wisconsin fire-adapted communities.
- Wingra Oak Savanna – open-grown bur oaks, being restored by the replacement of its understory of non-native trees, shrubs, and weeds with grassland species.

== Deciduous forests ==
- Gallistel Woods (28 acres) – will eventually be representative of a southern Wisconsin sugar maple forest.
- Grady Dry Oak Woods – part of the southern Wisconsin fire communities.
- Lost City Forest – mixed woodlands. Originally envisioned as an ambitious planned community, Lake Forest development planners began selling its first lots in 1918. However, the land wasn't suited for construction and roads and foundations soon began to sink. Financial fraud and a series of bankruptcies contributed to the abandonment of the project. There are still some concrete foundations and sidewalks visible in the area.
- Noe Woods (41 acres) – white oaks and black oaks; the larger oaks are now about 150 years old. Noe woods is named for the Bartlett-Noé (sometimes spelled Noe, without the accent over the “e”) family farm, which was sold by Mrs. Jessie Bartlett Noé to the University in 1933 for inclusion in the Arboretum.
- Wingra Woods (52 acres) – oak woods underplanted with sugar maple, basswood, and beech; gradually changing to a forest with sugar maple as the dominant species.

== Conifer forests ==
- Evjue Pines (22 acres) – red, white, and jack pines planted between 1952 and 1960, as well as red maple and paper birch.
- Leopold Pines (21 acres) – red and white pines planted between 1933 and 1937, with small numbers of red maple, white birch, and northern shrubs and ground plants.

== Wetlands ==
- Gardner Marsh – cattails, reed canary grass, exotic shrubs, and other woody vegetation.
- Redwing Marsh – habitat for redwinged blackbirds and waterfowl.
- Southeast Marsh – large wetland.
- Teal Pond Wetlands – sedge meadow and pond, with boardwalks.
- Wingra Marsh – relatively untouched wetlands.

== Horticultural collections ==
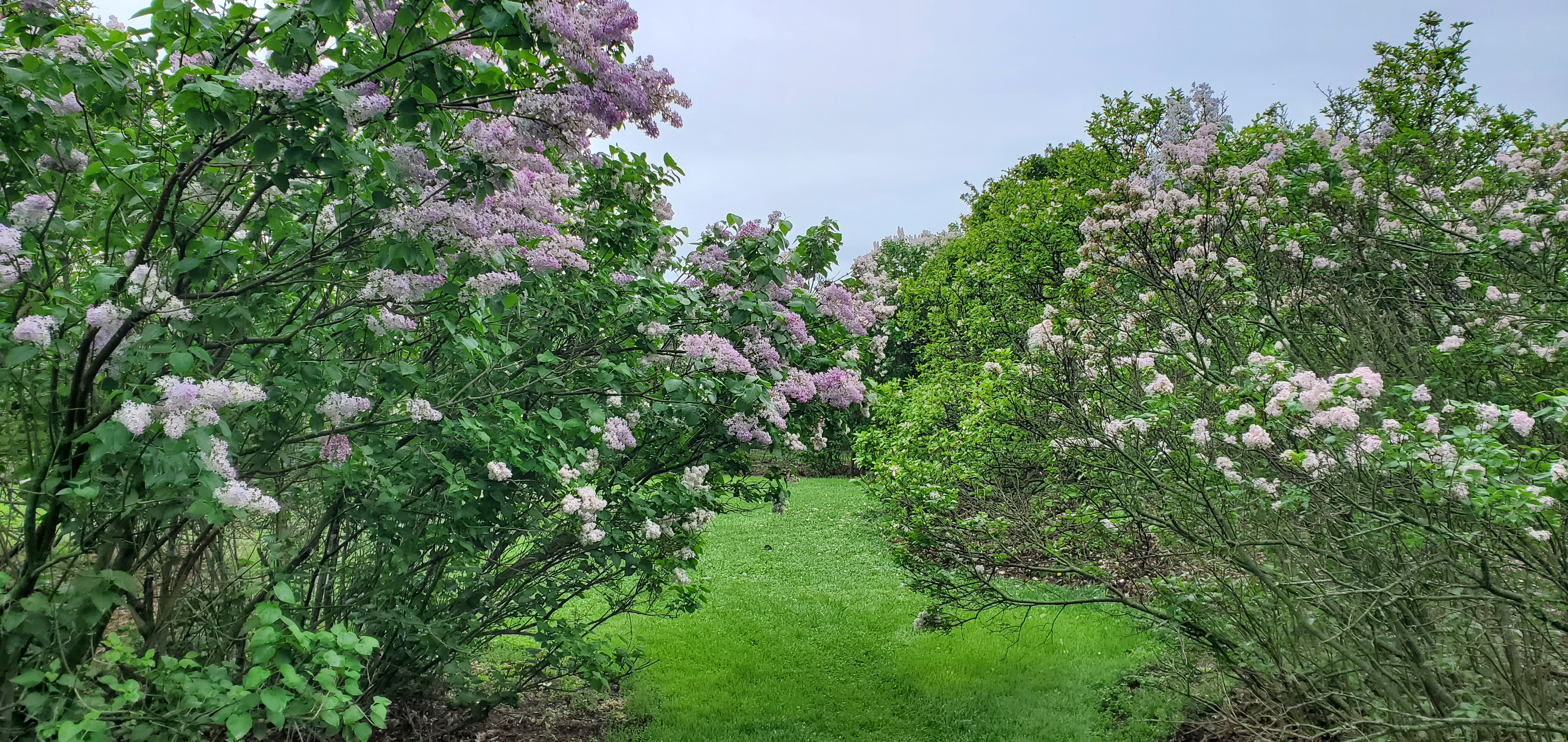
- This is 'entrance' to one of the Lilac 'Rooms' at the UW-Madison Arboretum Longenecker Horticultural Garden created by Bill Longenecker in the 1930's. Photo taken May 2022, on a visit by Bill's Son and wife, George W and Caryol Longenecker, and granddaughters, Karin Longenecker Crawford and Sara Meyer
  Longenecker Horticultural Gardens (35 acres) – more than 5,000 plants of more than 2,500 taxa; a leading collection of trees, shrubs and vines in Wisconsin. Major displays of lilacs, flowering crabapples (said to be one of the most complete and up-to-date in the world), viburnums, conifers (including a large collection of arborvitae cultivars), and dozens of other plant groups. More than 100 of Wisconsin's native woody plants are represented in the collections.
- Viburnum Garden – more than 80 species and varieties of viburnums, and 110 species and varieties of arborvitae.
- Pinetum, the conifer collection in the Longenecker Horticultural Gardens, which was started in 1937, and developed more substantially in 1976 and following.
- Wisconsin Native Plant Garden (4 acres) – approximately 500 native Wisconsin plants, with demonstrations for home landscaping.

== Mounds ==
The Native Americans who inhabited Wisconsin built multiple groups of effigy mounds in what is now the Arboretum. Two groups of mounds, both located along McCaffrey Drive, are accessible to visitors. The first group includes panther- and bird-shaped effigies along with a number of linear and conical mounds. The second group, in the Gallistel Woods area, consists of a panther effigy and two linear mounds. A third group of linear mounds is in the eastern portion of the Arboretum but is inaccessible by trail. Charles E. Brown of the Wisconsin Historical Society was responsible for restoring the publicly accessible mound groups.

== Recreational use ==
In addition to being a research facility, the Arboretum is also a leisure destination for local residents and tourists. It includes 20 miles of hiking trails, 3 miles of biking roads, 10 miles of ski/snowshoe routes. The Arboretum is open to the public daily without charge.

== Gallery ==
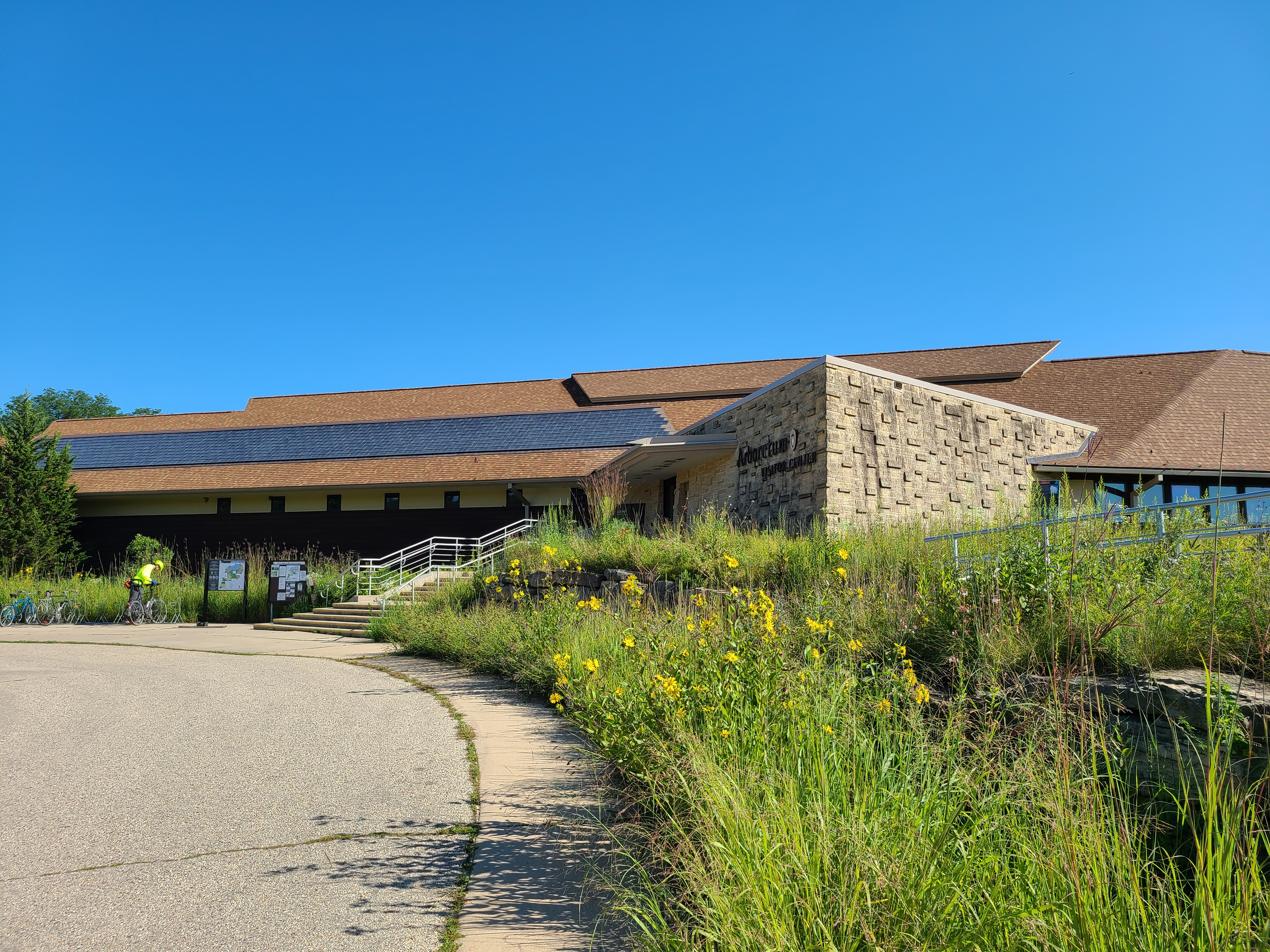
Visitor Center.

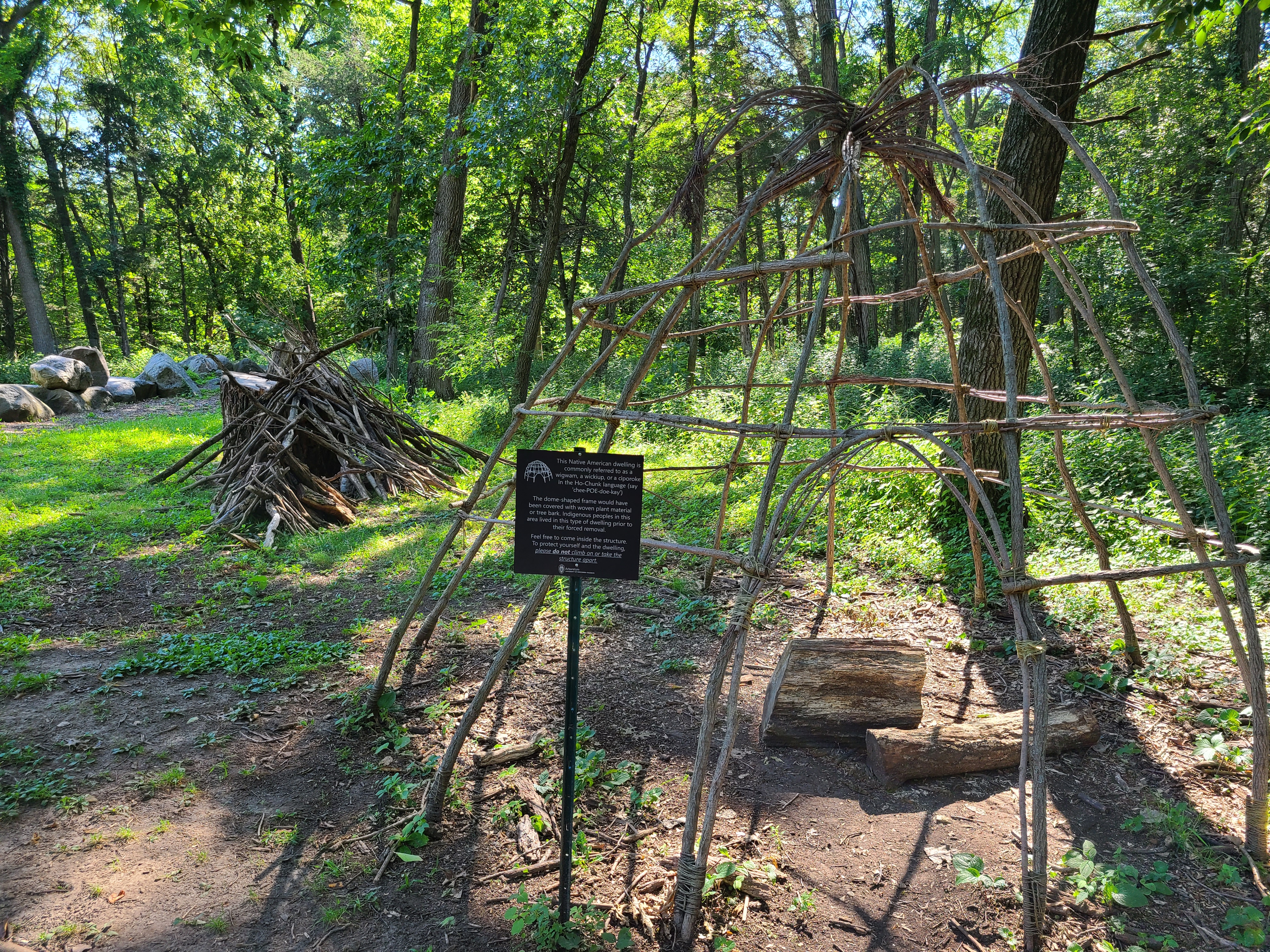
Wigwam display.

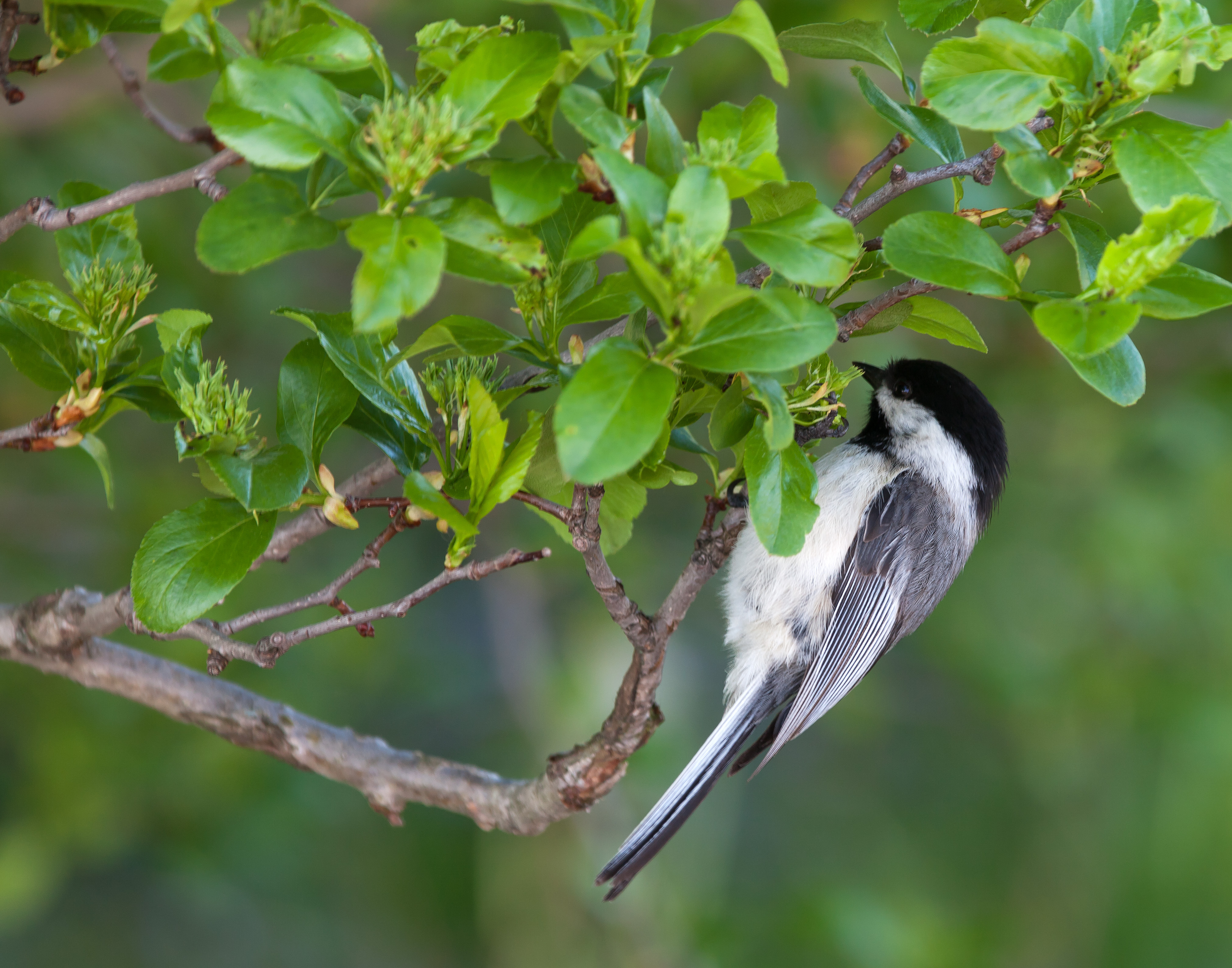
Chickadee, one of the many species in the area.

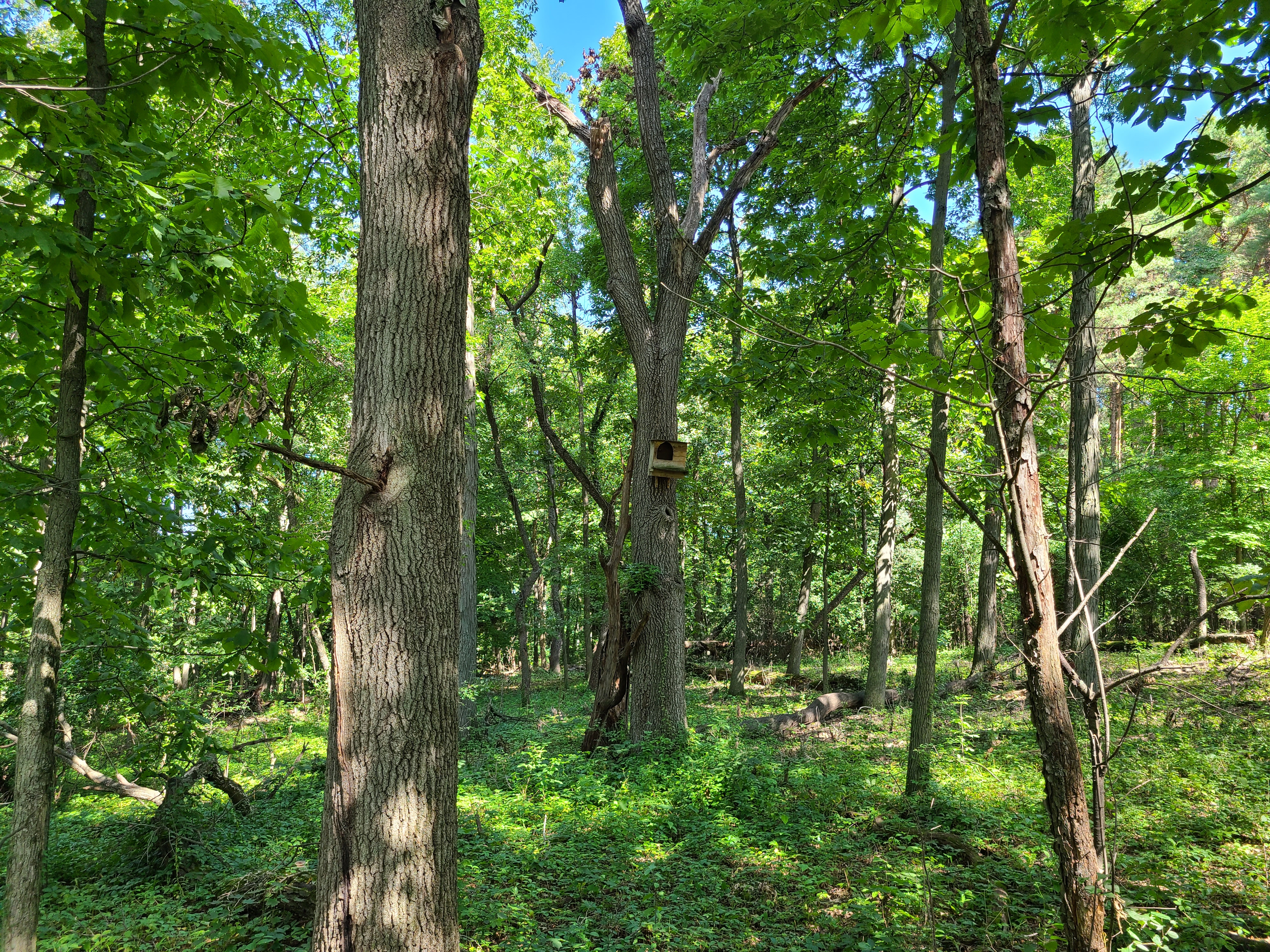
Nest box in a tree in the arboretum.

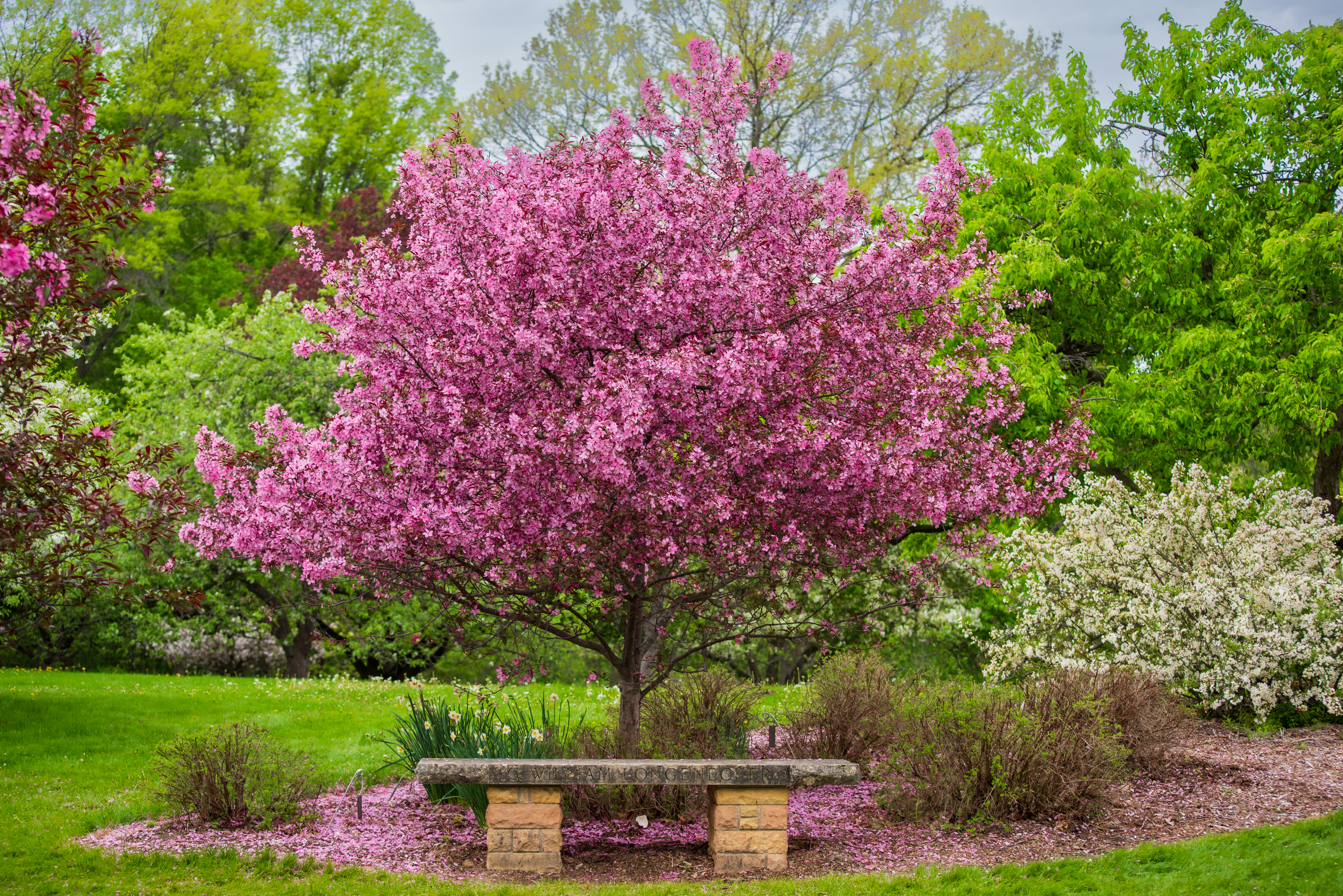
Crabapple tree in spring bloom.

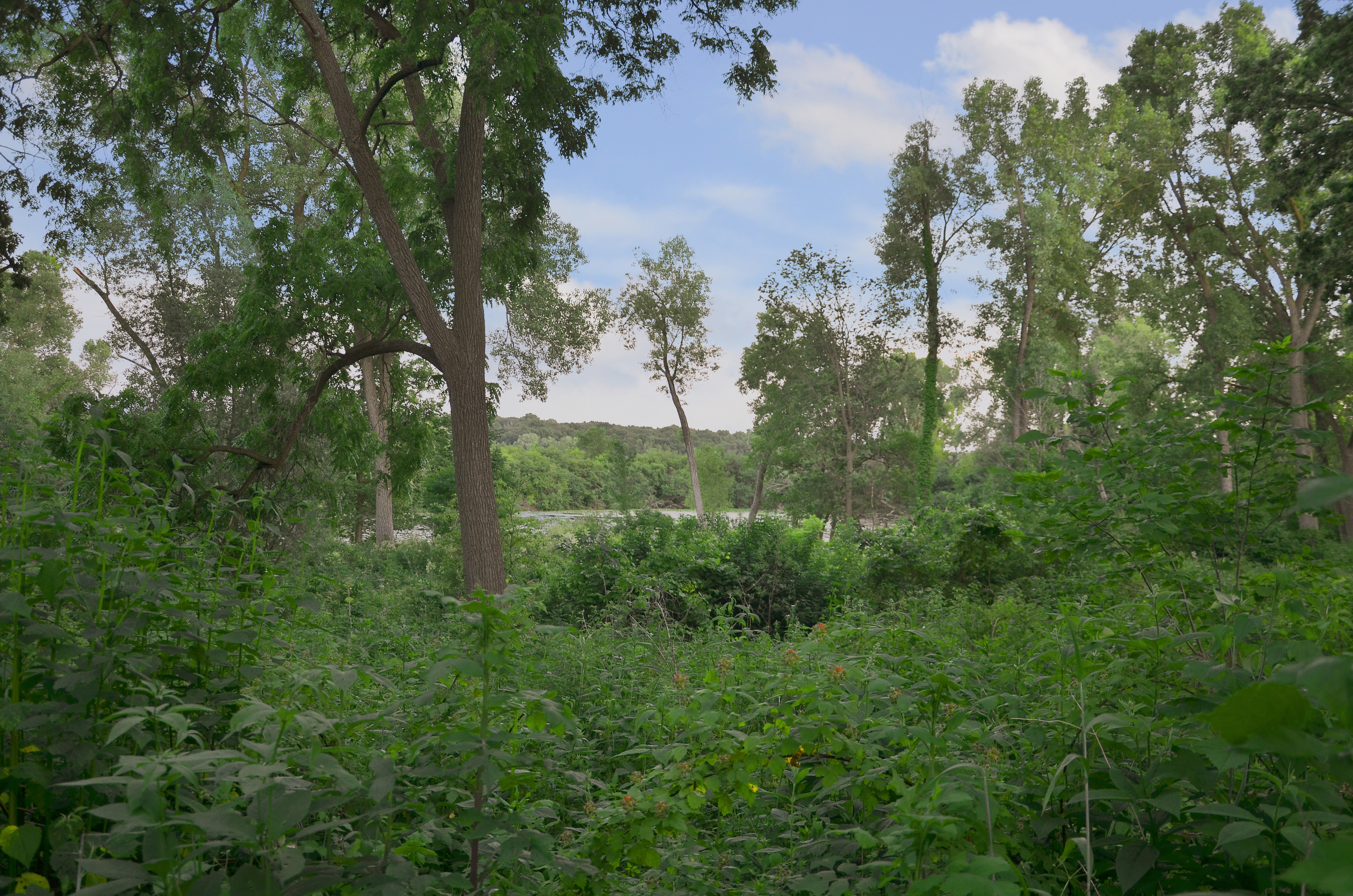
View of the forest.

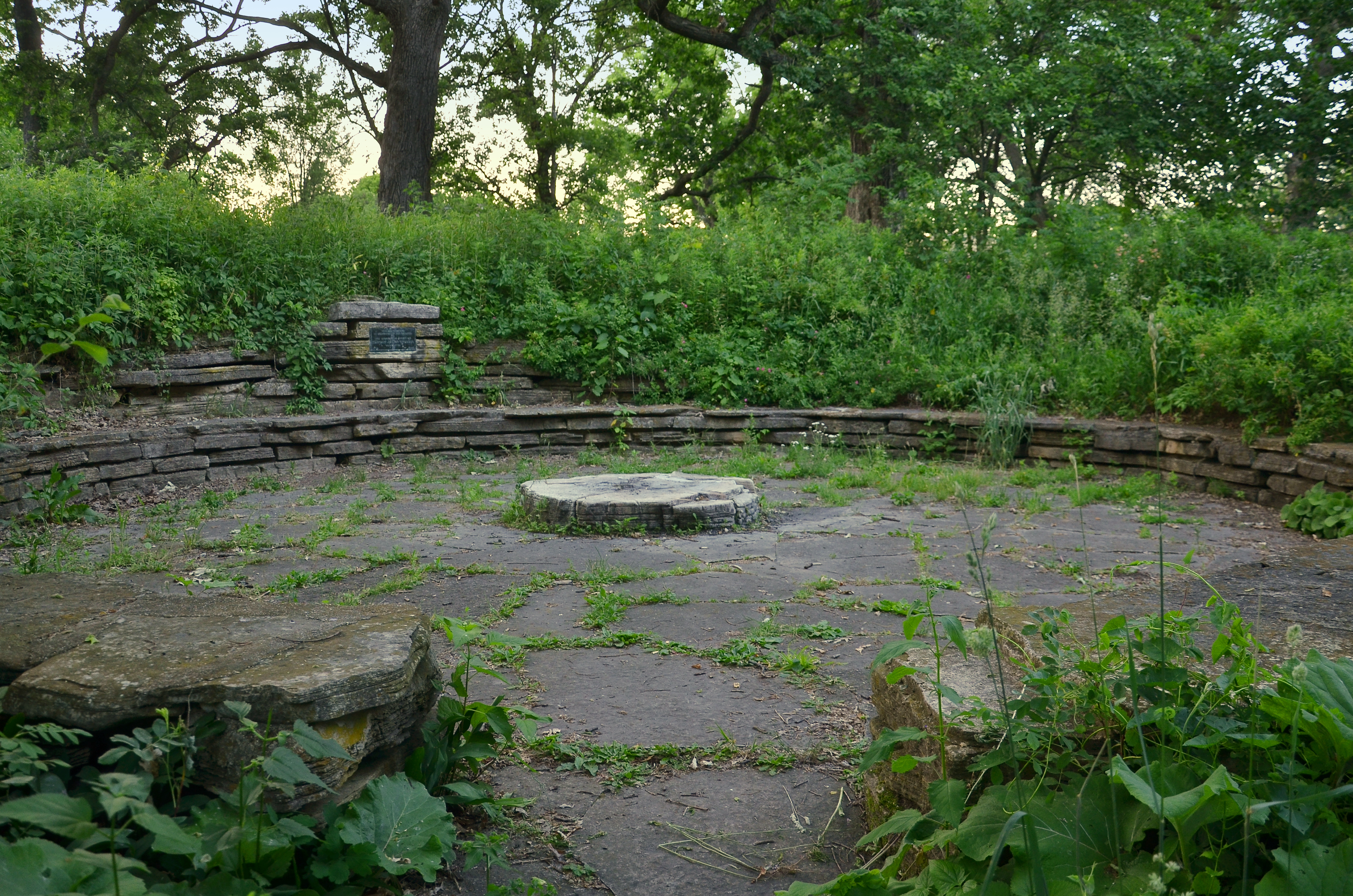
Wheeler Memorial Council Ring.

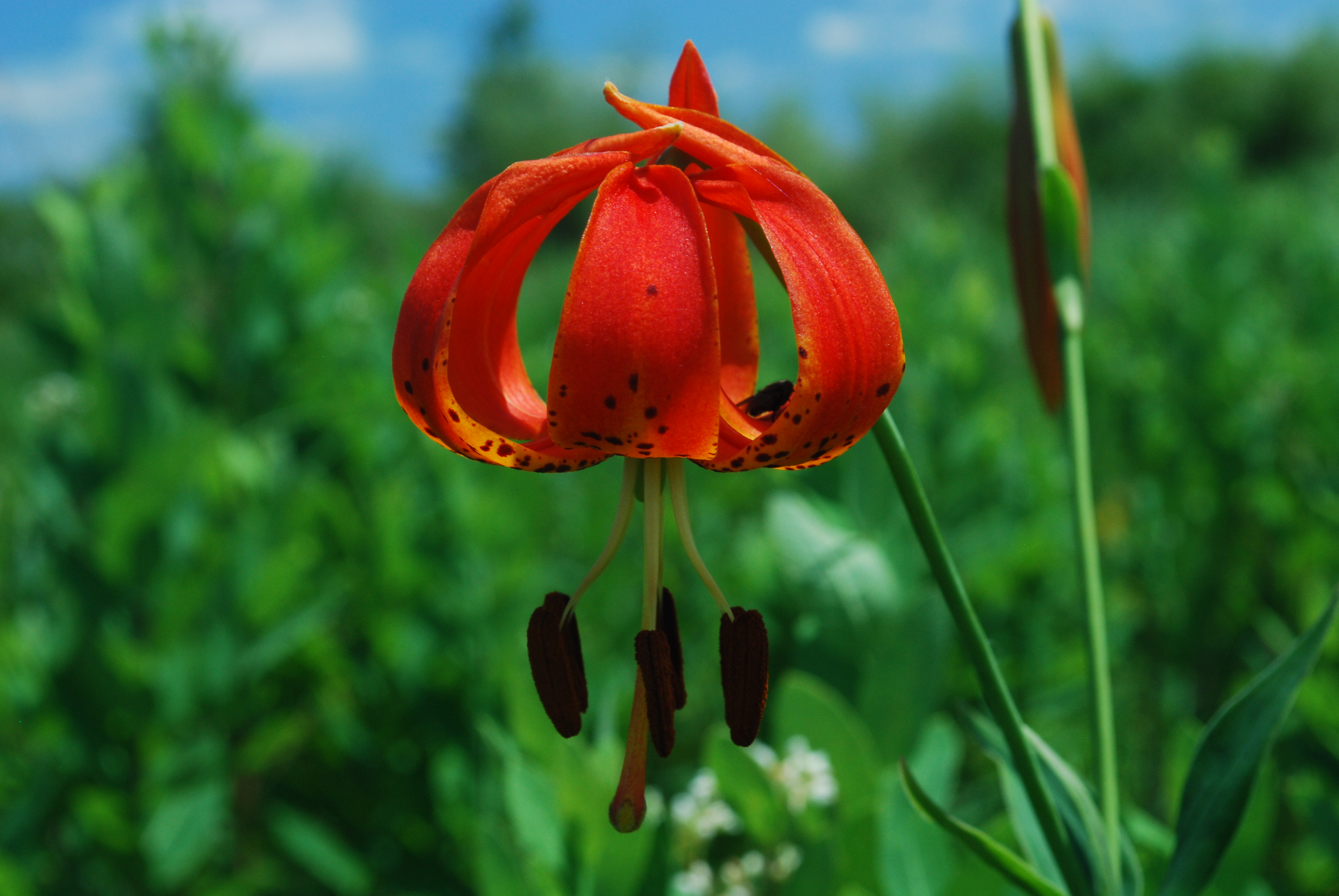
Lilium michiganense.

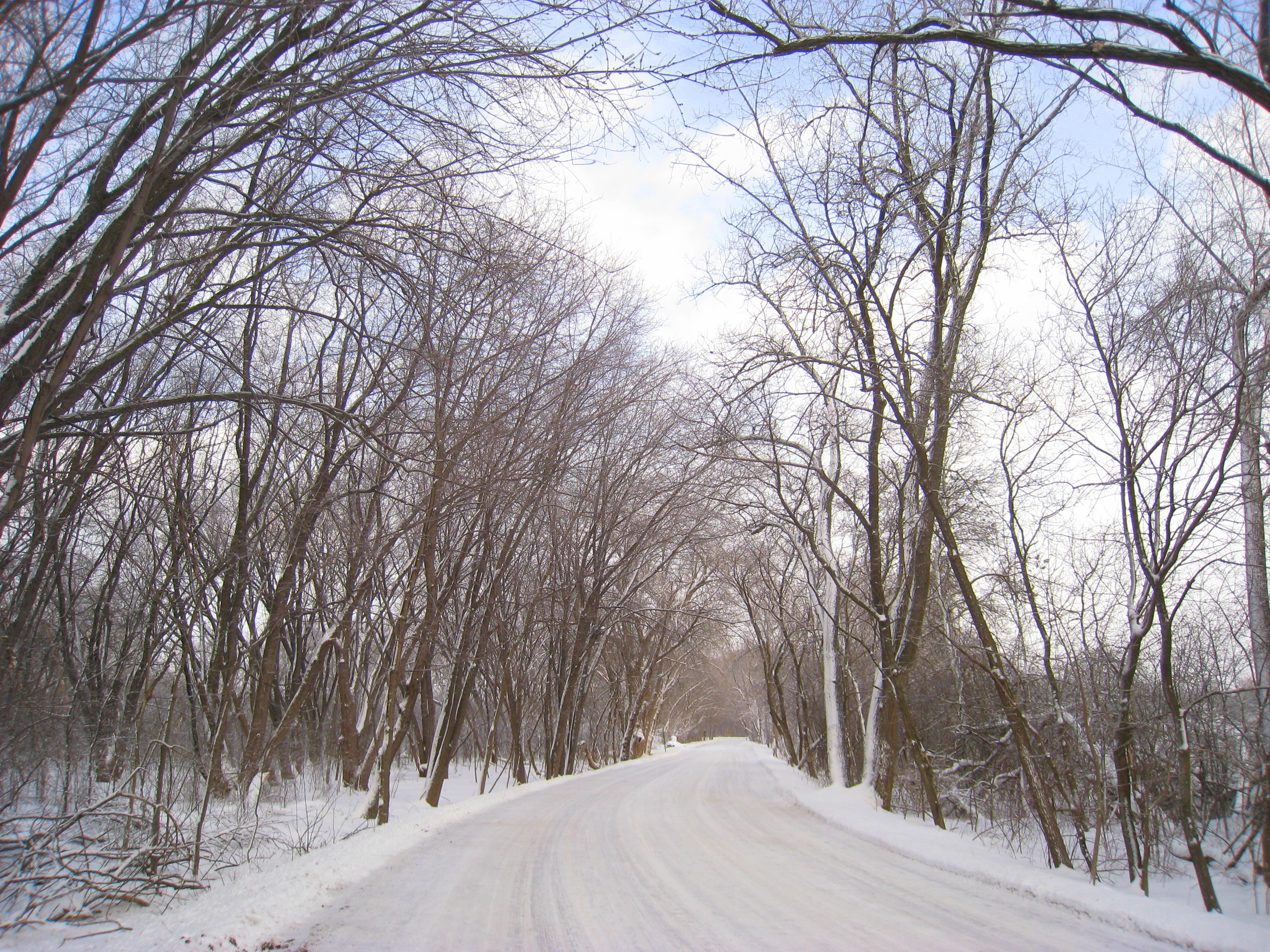
View of the arboretum in Winter.

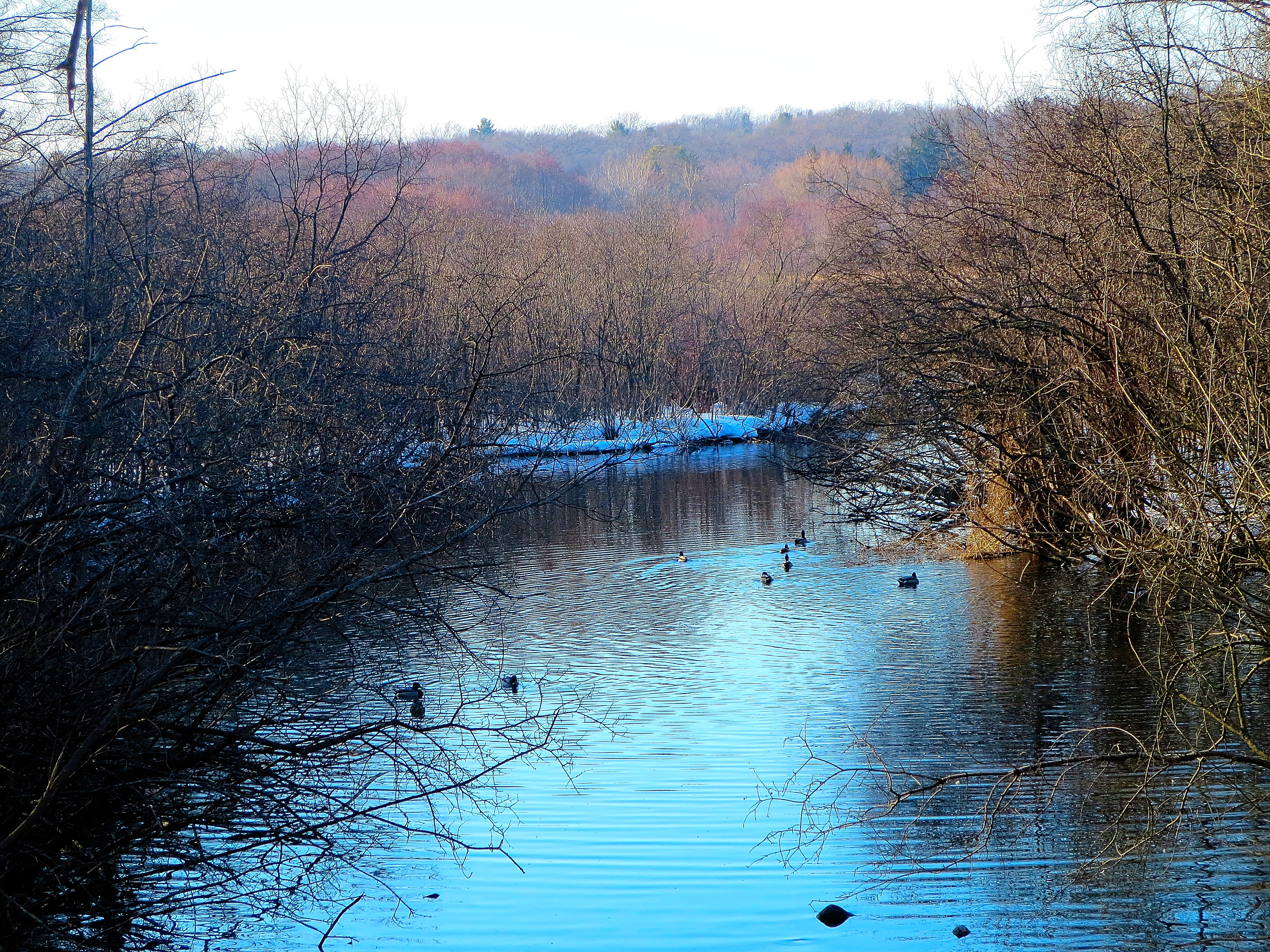
Ducks on a pond.

== See also ==
- List of botanical gardens and arboretums in Wisconsin
