= G. William Longenecker =

American landscape architect and academic

George William Longenecker (August 19, 1899 – February 25, 1969), usually known as Bill Longenecker, was an American landscape architect, educator, and executive director and co-creator of the University of Wisconsin–Madison Arboretum. His career lasted from 1926 to 1965. After earning his degree in landscape architecture, he became a professor in the subject and then the chairman of the Landscape Architecture Department at the University of Wisconsin in Madison.

== Early life ==
Longenecker was born on August 19, 1899, in Neillsville, Wisconsin, the son of George Washington Longenecker and Rose Longenecker (née Ernst). His father was born in Grofdale, Pennsylvania, and moved to central Michigan with his parents when he was a child. George studied at Oberlin College, in Oberlin, Ohio, and became a Congregational Minister; he and Rose moved to Northern Wisconsin to do mission work in the logging camps. Bill was born in Neilsville during this time.

The family moved to Berthold, North Dakota, homesteaded there, and then moved to Minot, North Dakota, and Provo, Utah. The family took the train out to Utah, then on the return trip, decided to take the wagon route, and engaged two horses, a mule and mountain wagon to travel back to Wisconsin, taking three months for the journey. Longenecker's mother, Rose, wrote an extensive diary of their time homesteading and traveling. George, Bill's father, was the pastor of the Neilsville Congregational Church for 38 years. Longenecker was one of four surviving children including his older sister, Gladys, older brother Ernst, and younger sister Lois.

Longenecker graduated from Neilsville High School. He attended the University of Wisconsin-Madison, from which he received a Bachelor of Science degree in 1924, and earned a Master of Science in horticulture in 1929. He was a member of Farmhouse Fraternity, also known as Delta Theta Sigma.

== Career ==
Longenecker joined the faculty of the University of Wisconsin-Madison in 1928 as an instructor; in 1933, he was made assistant professor, then associate professor in 1936. In 1947, he was made a professor. In the first few decades, Longenecker and Professor Franz Aust facilitated notable guest lectures for students, including lectures by Jens Jensen and Frank Lloyd Wright.

He served as the university's landscape architect. He was responsible for UW campus landscape design, supervision of installation, and overseeing of maintenance 1926 to 1965. In 196,4 the UW-Madison Landscape Architecture Department was separated from the Horticulture Department, where it had been a degree track. Longenecker served as its chairman until his retirement in 1967, and the department received accreditation under his leadership.

Longenecker was named the executive director of the arboretum at the UW-Madison in 1933 and served as executive director until 1958. He was responsible for all arboretum planning, design, and layout. He designed and planted the lilac 'rooms' in the horticultural garden in the mid-30's. He directed the activities of the arboretum superintendent and his maintenance crews and was responsible for the layout and selection of the plants in the horticultural gardens. In 1967, the horticulture gardens were named after him, thereafter known as the Longenecker Horticultural Gardens. He provided vision for the restoration of the prairie, which was later named the Curtis Prairie. He was referred to as the 'Father of the Arboretum' in the 1960s at the time of his death. Longenecker collaborated with Aldo Leopold as both were leaders of the UW Arboretum.

== Professional connections ==
At the time of his death, the Wisconsin State Journal wrote he was or had been associated with the American Society of Landscape Architects, the American Society of Botanical Gardens and Arboretums, the Association of Wisconsin Planners, the Wisconsin Parks and Recreation Society, the Wisconsin Friends of our Native Landscape (as Director), Wisconsin Development Council (advisor), the Wisconsin Academy of Science, Arts and Letters (vice-president).

=== ASLA Involvement ===
Longenecker was a member of the American Society of Landscape Architects (ASLA) in the 1950s and 60s. He was involved in the Chicago chapter of the ASLA, involved with hosting one of the chapter meetings each year in Madison in 1954 and 1955. In 1954, he led a panel discussion titled “Professional Training and Apprenticeship for Landscape Architects"

Longenecker was also a member of the ASLA National Capital Committee in 1956–1959, which served in an advisory role to the planning commission and government entities developing infrastructure in Washington, D.C. In 1956, the focus was on how the building of bridges and freeways would impact the surrounding public parks and landscape.

=== Wisconsin state appointments ===
Longenecker was appointed in February 1932 to confer with the state historical society regarding the preservation of Indian mounds, which were being jeopardized or endangered by the relocation of highways. Wisconsin Governor Knowles appointed Longenecker to be on the State Natural Beauty Committee and also a special advisory committee regarding the design of the landscape along I-94 between Madison and Milwaukee.

=== Neilsville ===
Longenecker assisted in his hometown, though he no longer lived there; helping Kurt Listeman in the planning of the Listeman Arboretum in Neilsville, and undertaking the planning and design work for a section of the local arboretum which ended up not being created; this “University Section” anticipated some formal plantings of unusual trees and shrubbery. He also assisted in the layout and design of the American Legion Park, with work at Schuster Park and other similar efforts in Neilsville.

== Personal life ==
Longenecker married Sarah Schuyler Stebbins (born Aug 11, 1905) on June 22, 1926. Their son George, also a graduate of the University of Wisconsin, was a professor of landscape architecture at West Virginia University, and founded the West Virginia Botanic Garden.

Longenecker was the president of the Madison Silde and Movie Club.

== Legacy ==
Longenecker's primary legacy is the large and complete university arboretum. For his service to the nature laboratory, an entire horticultural area, including lilac and ornamental crab apple areas, was named the Longenecker Horticultural Gardens.

He also introduced the Autumn Purple White Ash into the professional nursery trade.
