= Eunice Fisher =

American plant cultivator

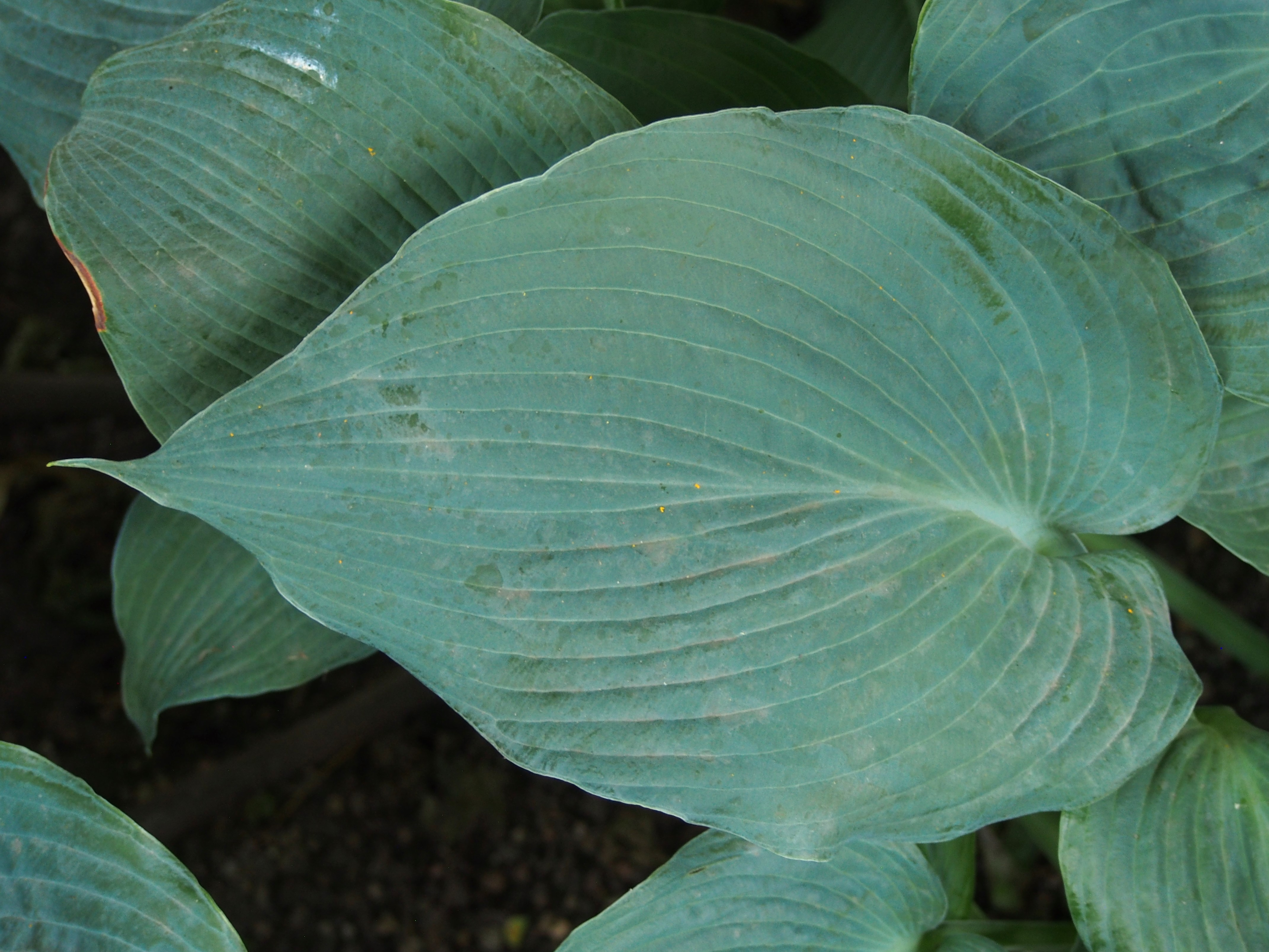
- a Blue Rock hosta, created by Fisher and David Stone
- Born: September 6, 1894; Rushford
- Died: March 13, 1984 (aged 89)

Eunice Viola Fisher (September 6, 1894 – March 13, 1984) was an American plant cultivator and hybridizer of hostas.

Eunice Viola Harvey was born on September 6, 1894 in Rushford, Wisconsin, the daughter of Addison Harvey and Alice Cook Harvey. She married Glen Fisher in 1912.

She and Alex J. Summers founded the American Hosta Society (AHS) in 1968 and she served as its first secretary-treasurer. The AHS's Eunice Fisher Award for the best large-leaved hosta cultivar is named for her. In 1969, she published Hosta, The Aristocratic Plant for Shady Gardens, the first attempt to comprehensively catalog hosta varieties.

Eunice Fisher died on March 13, 1984.

== Bibliography ==
- Fisher, E. V. [1969, 1973] 1979. Hosta, The Aristocratic Plant for Shady Gardens. Self-published.
- Fisher, E. V. 1983. A Note on H. 'Frances Williams'. The American Hosta Society Bulletin 14:12-14.
