= Susan Look Avery =

American writer and suffragist (1817–1915)

Susan Howes Look Avery
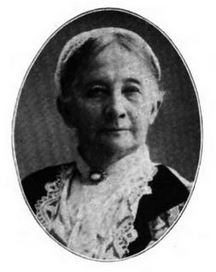
- Avery's portrait in History of Woman Suffrage, Volume IV, 1883-1900, page 678
- Born: October 27, 1817; Conway, Massachusetts, U.S.
- Died: February 1, 1915 (aged 97); Wyoming, New York, U.S.
- Occupations: Suffragist; clubwoman
- Spouse: Benjamin F. Avery (m. 1844; died 1885)
- Children: 6, including Lydia Avery Coonley

Susan Look Avery (née Look; October 27, 1817 – February 1, 1915) was an American writer, suffragist, pacifist and supporter of temperance as well as a single tax. She hosted Lucy Stone and husband Henry Blackwell when they came to Louisville, Kentucky for the American Woman Suffrage Association meeting—the first suffrage convention in the South—in 1881. In 1890 she started the Woman's Club of Louisville, and in honor of her birthday, the suffrage club of Wyoming, New York, named itself after her.

== Early life ==
The eldest of six children of Samuel and Polly Lommis Look, Susan Howes Look was born on October 27, 1817, in Conway, Massachusetts. She moved with her family to western New York where she grew up in a rural setting and among the many who were impacted by the Second Great Awakening in the "Burned-Over District." She enrolled in the Utica Female Seminary at age seventeen and after graduation stayed to teach there. In 1843 she traveled to the village of Wyoming, New York with her sister Julia who had been hired to teach in Middlebury Academy there. On her way home, she visited friends in Aurora and there she met Benjamin F. Avery, an industrialist.

Benjamin Avery and Susan married on April 27, 1844. The next year, they bought a summer residence - Hillside - in Wyoming which they shared with Susan's sister, Julia and her husband, Albert Capwell, a lawyer in Brooklyn, New York. Together, they had six children: Lydia Avery Coonley Ward (born 1845), Samuel (born 1846), Gertrude (born 1849), George C. (born March 1, 1852), Helen "Nelly" (born 1855) and William (born 1858).

On December 25, 1847, the Avery family moved to Louisville, Kentucky to start up an agricultural foundry and plow factory. By 1868, with the founding of a new firm B.F. Avery and Sons (Samuel and George with son-in-law J.C. Coonley), the Averys became one of the wealthiest families in Louisville. During the Civil War, the Avery Plow manufacturing buildings were converted into a Union soldiers' hospital and Mrs. Avery would bring the dying into her own home for hospice care. They were outspoken Unionists and family lore is that they were the first in Louisville to fly the U.S. flag despite the threats from the Knights of the Golden Circle. For two years during the Civil War, she toured Europe. In 1873 the Averys moved in to a mansion at Fourth and Broadway, the most fashionable residential area in the city. There, in 1885, Benjamin Avery died.

== Political and reform activities ==
=== Woman suffrage ===
Susan Look Avery hosted Lucy Stone and Henry Blackwell of the American Woman Suffrage Association when they were in Louisville for the national convention in 1881. When the Louisville Equal Rights Association started up in 1889, she was an important founding member. Avery also hosted many reformers at her summer residence, Hillside, once a spa in Wyoming, New York. According to her family, in her later years, she invited and hosted such notables as Susan B. Anthony, Reverend Anna Howard Shaw, Charlotte Perkins Gilman, and Booker T. Washington.

=== Temperance ===
Avery was a strong temperance supporter. She wrote:

Let us also thank God and take courage, that women, through whom sanitation must come... are thinking and speaking on the subject - the prevention of vice, crime and sorrow as never before; with an earnestness born of conviction of responsibility and the fervent desire to meet it.

=== Women's club ===
In 1890 the first meeting of the Louisville Woman's Club was held in the library of her home in Louisville. Mrs. Avery, her daughter Helen, Mrs. Patty B. Semple, and Mrs. Andrew Cowan had drawn up the list of women to invite - and thirty-nine women accepted. Mrs. Avery was not present for this event, but she sent the following message from Chicago where she was staying with her daughter, Lydia Avery Coonley Ward: "Ladies, you have been invited here today for a great purpose. I have felt for a long time that women should not just sit back and talk about what should be done for the welfare of our country but should get together and do something about it." She served second vice president for one year.

In 1891 she became a charter member of the Warsaw Political Equality Club. And a year after she helped start another equal rights club in the village of Wyoming, they changed its name to the Susan Look Avery Club in 1901 in honor of her 83rd birthday. The club continues today as a social club for women.

In September 1900, she hosted all the officers of the National American Woman Suffrage Association after their business meeting in Rochester, New York.

She also served for many years as an honorary vice-president of the General Federation of Women's Clubs (GFWC). Her strong advocacy for the admission of African American women's clubs to the GFWC was in vain.

=== Pacifism ===
She spoke out against the Spanish–American War and the imperialistic treatment of the Philippines by the McKinley administration.

Since the first suggestion of the political equality of men and women came to me, many years ago. I have been an ardent woman suffragist. A wise statesman has said. "The first desire of every cultivated mind is to take part in the great work of government.' When I think of present conditions, not only In South Africa and the Philippines, but in our own nominally Christian land, I am appalled by the apathy and indifference of intelligent and in some ways thoughtful women. If they could be awakened to their possibilities, opportunities and duties. If they could but realize the fact that they are one-half of the people; that they are citizens, and that 'the right of citizens to vote shall not be abridged.' I am sure that the world's housekeeping would be improved.

=== Single tax, free trade and silver ===
Avery was an advocate for silver coinage and supporter of William J. Bryan. She was a guest of honor at the Second Annual Single Tax Conference held in Chicago in 1911 and spoke at the Fels Fund dinner to praise their stance on "the color line." She said,

We can never be prosperous and blessed as a nation until we are just to the colored man. We have many problems of deepest interest to be solved, to which we cannot too soon or too earnestly address ourselves. Not only the Singletax on land values, but woman suffrage, free trade the world over, and I am very desirous that honest commerce shall perform the Christian missionary work of the world. At present we are at vast expense of life and treasure sending missionaries to people who are better than we -- and who would be justified in sending missionaries to us. For example, the Filipinos and the Chinese, who live up to their idea of the precepts of the Gold Rule and the Sermon on the Mount better than we do.

== Works ==
- Response to Florence Kelly, "Household Labor," Figaro (May 7, 1892).
- "Politics, A Moral Science"
- "Greedy England," Harper's Weekly (June 1897)
- Op ed, Wyoming Reporter (December 10, 1898)

== See also ==
- Lydia Avery Coonley

== Resources ==
- Birnsteel, Laurie A. (2001). "Avery, Susan Howes (Look)". In Kleber, John E. (ed.). The Encyclopedia of Louisville. Lexington: University Press of Kentucky. p. 56.
- Courier-Journal [Louisville, Ky.], May 13, 1923, April 19, 1951, June 2, 1951.
- Post, Louis Freeland; Post, Alice Thatcher; Cooley, Stoughton (February 12, 1915). "Death of Susan Look Avery". The Public: A Journal of Democracy. 18 (880): 159.
- Guethlein, Carol (April 1981). "Women in Louisville: Moving Toward Equal Rights". The Filson Club Historical Quarterly. 55: 151–78.
- Anthony, Susan B.; Harper, Ida Husted, eds. (1902). History of Woman Suffrage, Volume IV, 1883–1900. Rochester, N.Y.: Susan B. Anthony. pp. 612, 678.
- Kirk, Jane (January 1978). "Susan Look Avery: A Nineteenth Century Reformer" (PDF). Historical Wyoming County [Warsaw, New York]. pp. 1, 58–64.
- Seekamp, Alwin; Burlingame, Roger, eds. (1912). "Avery, Susan Look". Who's Who in Louisville. Louisville, Ky.: Louisville Press Club. p. 48.
- "Susan Look Avery One of the Club Women Who Did Not Attend the Biennial". Los Angeles Herald. No. 271. California Digital Newspaper Collection. 29 June 1902.
- The [Louisville] Woman's Club Bulletin, vol. 29, no. 7, March 1965.
- Woman's Who's Who of America: A Biographical Dictionary of Contemporary Women of the United States and Canada. New York: American Commonwealth Company. 1914. p. 61. "Susan Look Avery club, of Wyoming N. Y."
