= Wyoming Village Historic District =

Wyoming Village Historic District may refer to:

- Wyoming Village Historic District (Wyoming, New York), listed on the National Register of Historic Places
- Wyoming Village Historic District in the village of Wyoming, Rhode Island, listed on the National Register
- Village Historic District in Wyoming, Ohio
