= Bryant Fleming =

American architect and landscape designer

- Born: July 19, 1877; Buffalo, New York
- Died: September 19, 1946 (aged 69); Warsaw, New York
- Occupation: Architect
- Design: Cheekwood Botanical Garden and Museum of Art

Bryant Fleming (July 19, 1877 – September 19, 1946) was an American architect and landscape architect.

== Early life ==
Fleming was born on July 19, 1877, in Buffalo, New York. He graduated from Cornell University in 1901, where he studied horticulture, architecture, architectural history, and art.

== Career ==
Fleming became the first lecturer and instructor in landscape art in the Department of Landscape Art in the College of Agriculture at Cornell University in 1904, the third such program in the United States after Harvard (1900) and the University of Massachusetts (1902). He served as head of the department from 1906 to 1915 and in 1925 was appointed as University Landscape Advisor to Cornell.

Fleming established a private practice named Townsend and Fleming (1904–1915). He helped guide the development of parks in New York State, including Letchworth State Park and the restoration of Watkins Glen State Park, Fair Haven Beach State Park, Fillmore Glen State Park, Robert H. Treman State Park, Taughannock Falls State Park, Cedar Point State Park, Kring Point State Park, and Waterson Point State Park. In addition, he served with Warren H. Manning (1860–1938) and others on a comprehensive campus plan for Cornell. For 30 years Fleming and his associates had an extensive residential design practice all over the country, including estates in Belle Meade, Tennessee, and the design of Cheekwood Botanical Garden and Museum of Art, a 100-acre (0.40 km^{2}) estate where Fleming guided the design of the landscape, architecture, and interiors.

== Death ==
Fleming died on September 19, 1946.

== Selected works ==
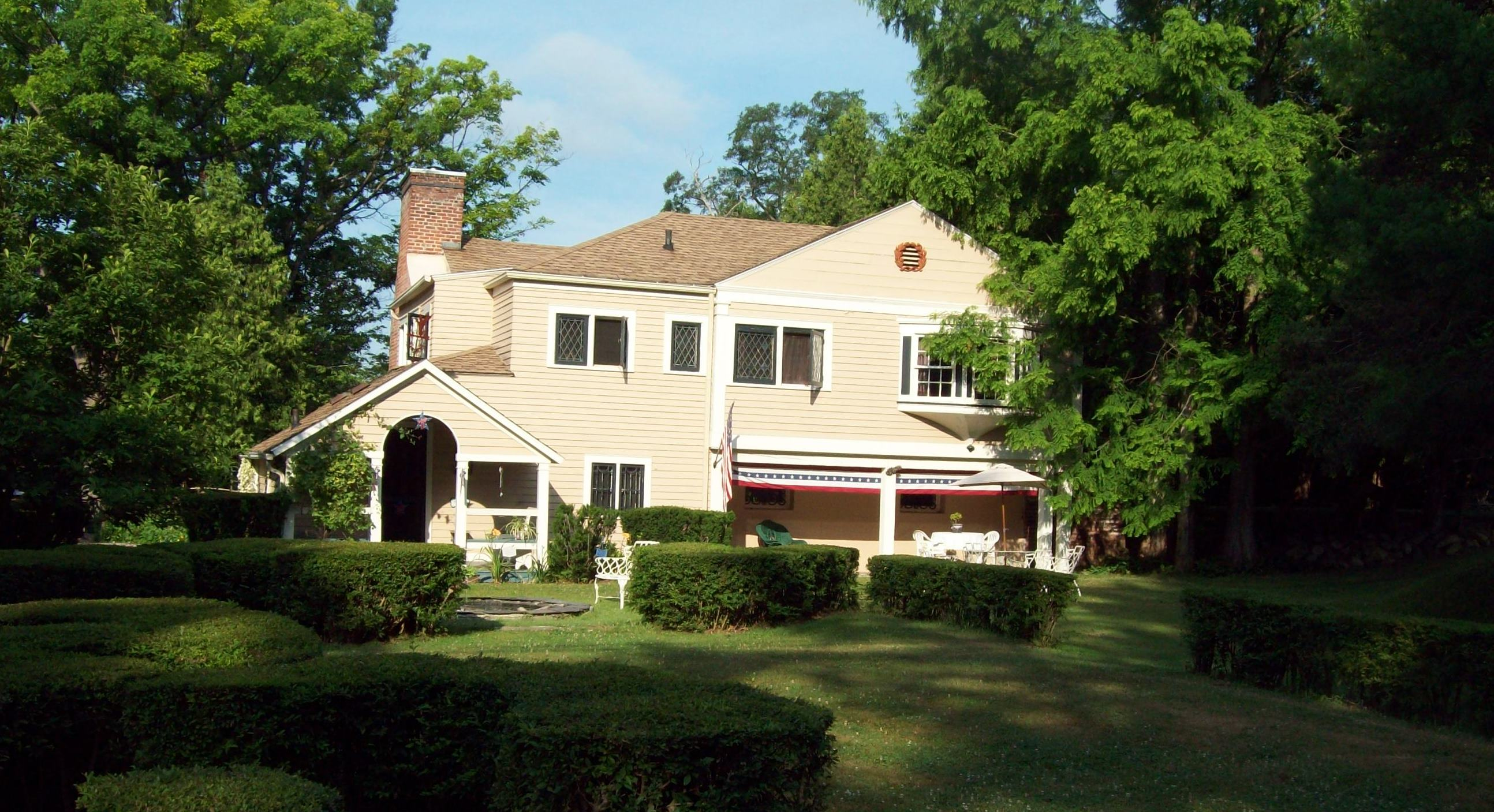
Bryant Fleming House - Playhouse, Wyoming, NY, July 2011N

- 1920s: Cheekwood Botanical Garden and Museum of Art, Nashville, Tennessee, listed on the National Register of Historic Places in 2000.
- 1920s: Paine Art Center and Gardens, Oshkosh, Wisconsin, listed on the National Register of Historic Places in 1978.
- 1920s: Bryant Fleming House, Wyoming, New York, listed on the National Register of Historic Places in 2009.
