= Lydia Avery Coonley =

American writer and poet (1845–1924)

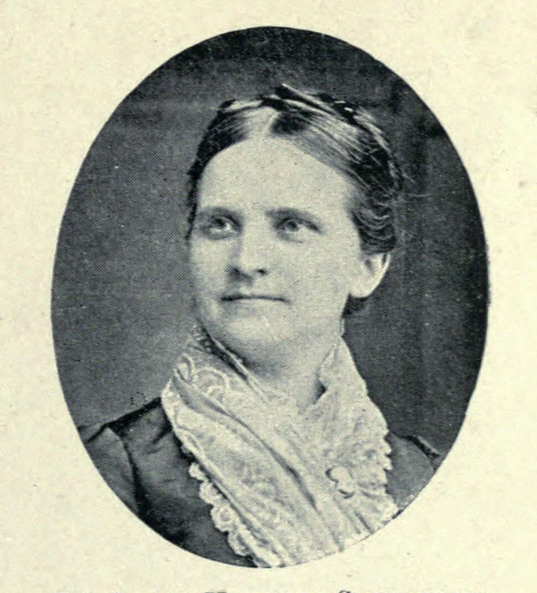
- Lydia Avery Coonley, 1894
- Born: Lydia Avery; January 31, 1845; Lynchburg, Virginia, U.S.
- Died: February 26, 1924 (aged 79); Chicago, Illinois, U.S.
- Resting place: Graceland Cemetery
- Other names: Lydia Avery Coonley Ward
- Known for: Social leader; clubwoman; writer
- Spouses: John Clark Coonley (m. 1867; died 1882) Henry Augustus Ward (m. 1897; died 1906)
- Children: 6
- Mother: Susan Look Avery

Lydia Arms Avery Coonley-Ward (January 31, 1845 – February 26, 1924) was a social leader, clubwoman and writer. Coonley served as a president of the Chicago Women's Club and was known for her poetry. She also helped her second husband, Henry Augustus Ward, enlarge his meteorite collection.

== Biography ==
Coonley was born in Lynchburg, Virginia, and the family moved to Louisville, Kentucky when she was five. She was the oldest of five other siblings. Her parents were abolitionists and her father's factory was used as a hospital for Union soldiers during the Civil War. Coonley's mother, Susan Look Avery, was an important leader in the women's suffrage movement and started the first woman's club in Louisville.

She married John Clark Coonley on December 24, 1867, and the couple moved to St. Louis after their marriage until 1868, when they came back to Louisville so that John could work in her father's business. In 1873, after establishing a Chicago-based company, the family moved to Chicago. She and her husband had six children, all of whom she encouraged to write. On October 6, 1882, her husband died in Indianapolis.

Coonley was a member of the Chicago Women's Club, joining sometime in the late 1880s. On March 21, 1888, she served as one of the representatives of the club to the Women's International Congress in Washington, D.C. Between 1895 and 1896, she served as the president of the Chicago Women's Club. On May 17, 1901, she urged the club to take an official position on the issue of peace.

Coonley married Henry Augustus Ward, who owned the world's largest meteor collection, on March 18, 1897. Coonley was involved in helping enlarge his collection. After his death following a car accident in 1906, she worked to sell the collection, known as the Ward-Coonley collection, to various museums. In 1911, Coonley sold her home in Chicago and moved to her summer home named "Hillside," a country estate located in Wyoming, New York.

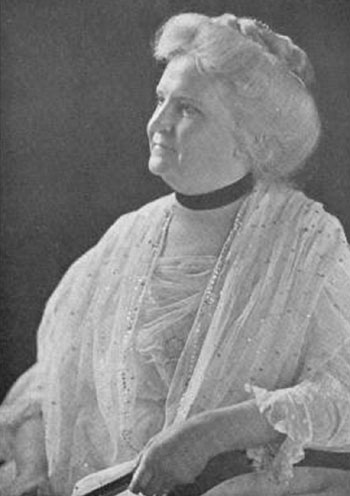
Mrs. Lydia Avery Coonley Ward, circa 1914–15

Coonley started a summer school in 1914 for young artists, operating it out of her home. She also hosted plays at her home. She was also a patron to the arts. She was the sponsor for the Free Library in Wyoming, New York.

Coonley lost two of her children in 1920 and continued to deal with depression during the last years of her life.

Coonley died in her son's home, in Chicago, on February 26, 1924. Her funeral was held in Graceland Chapel, Chicago, on February 28, 1924. The great social reformer and peace activist Jane Addams gave the eulogy. She was buried in Graceland Cemetery.

== Writing ==
Coonley started writing for the Home and Farm in 1878, using the pseudonym, Lois Catesby. Coonley released a book of her poems, Under the Pines and Other Verses in 1895. The Chicago Tribune wrote that the book contained "charming sentiment on love and nature and the divinity of everyday life." The Weekly Wisconsin called Under the Pines "rather above the average." In 1896, she wrote the lyrics for "Our Flag With the Stars and Stripes" and in 1897, she collaborated with several others to created Singing Verses for Children. Singing Verses for Children included poetry, illustrations and music. The Tennessean called the book one of the "most attractive of the new volumes published at the holiday season for the delight of young people."

== Publications ==
- Chronicles of an American Home, Hillside (Wyoming, New York) and its family: 1858-1928. J.J. Little & Ives Co., 1930. https://catalog.hathitrust.org/api/volumes/oclc/2069855.html
- The Melody of Childhood. New York: James T. White & Co., 1921. https://hdl.handle.net/2027/uc2.ark:/13960/t8mc8s524
- An Evening Trip to the Saint Louis Fair: as set forth in this guidebook and thirty-six stereoscopic views in full natural colors. Chicago: Little Chronicle Pub. Co., 1905.
- George F. Root and His Songs. [n.p.], [189-?].
- "Love Songs." Chicago: [Wind-Tryst Press], 1899.
- "Wind-tryst." Chicago: [Wind-Tryst Press], 1898.
- Singing Verses for Children. New York: Macmillan Company, 1897.
- "Sakonnet Cove," New England Magazine 16, no. 6 (August 1897).
- Address of the president, Lydia Avery Coonley, to the Chicago Woman's Club, May 20, 1896. [Chicago], [1896].
- Under the pines, and other verses. Chicago: Way & Williams, 1895. https://catalog.hathitrust.org/api/volumes/oclc/1853874.html

== See also ==
- Susan Look Avery
