= Middlebury Academy =

Middlebury Academy may refer to:

- Middlebury Academy (Wyoming, New York), listed on the National Register of Historic Places in New York
- Middlebury Academy (Middlebury, Vermont), the predecessor of Middlebury College
