= Ward's Science =

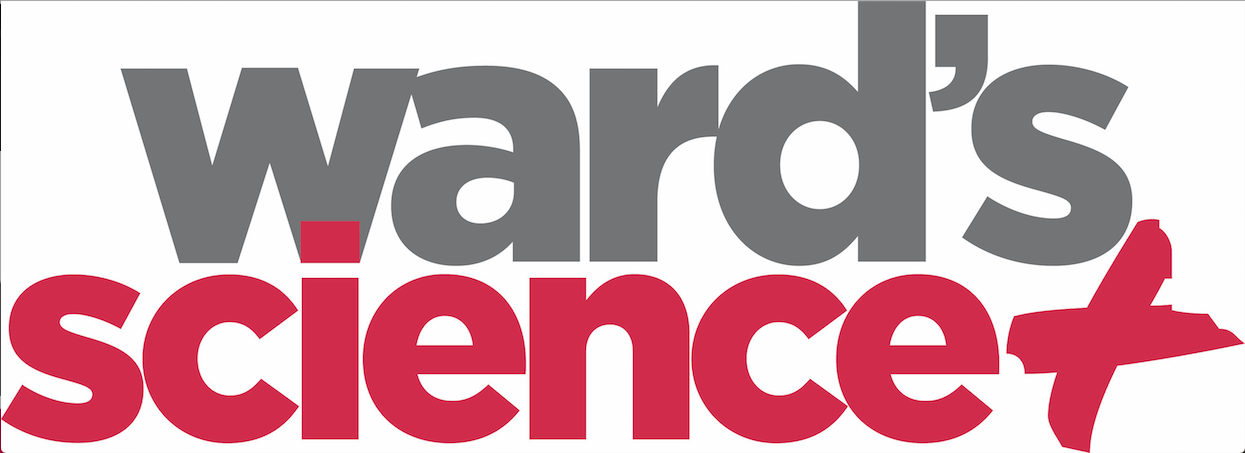
- Ward's Science's Logo (as of 2018)
- Company type: Subsidiary
- Industry: Scientific products distributor
- Founded: 1862
- Founder: Henry Augustus Ward
- Headquarters: 5100 W Henrietta Rd, Rochester, NY 14586, United States
- Area served: International
- Products: Instructional materials
- Parent: VWR International
- Website: www.wardsci.com

Ward's Science is a supplier of science education materials for K-12 and college-level studies in Rochester, New York. It was founded by Henry Augustus Ward in 1862 as Ward's Natural Science and was renamed in 2012.

Current areas of focus include: geology, earth science, biology, chemistry, environmental science, forensic science, and physical science.

Ward's Science and its affiliates, Boreal Science and Sargent-Welch, provide science education materials for elementary through college classrooms.
