= Bryant Fleming House =

Historic house in New York, United States

- U.S. National Register of Historic Places
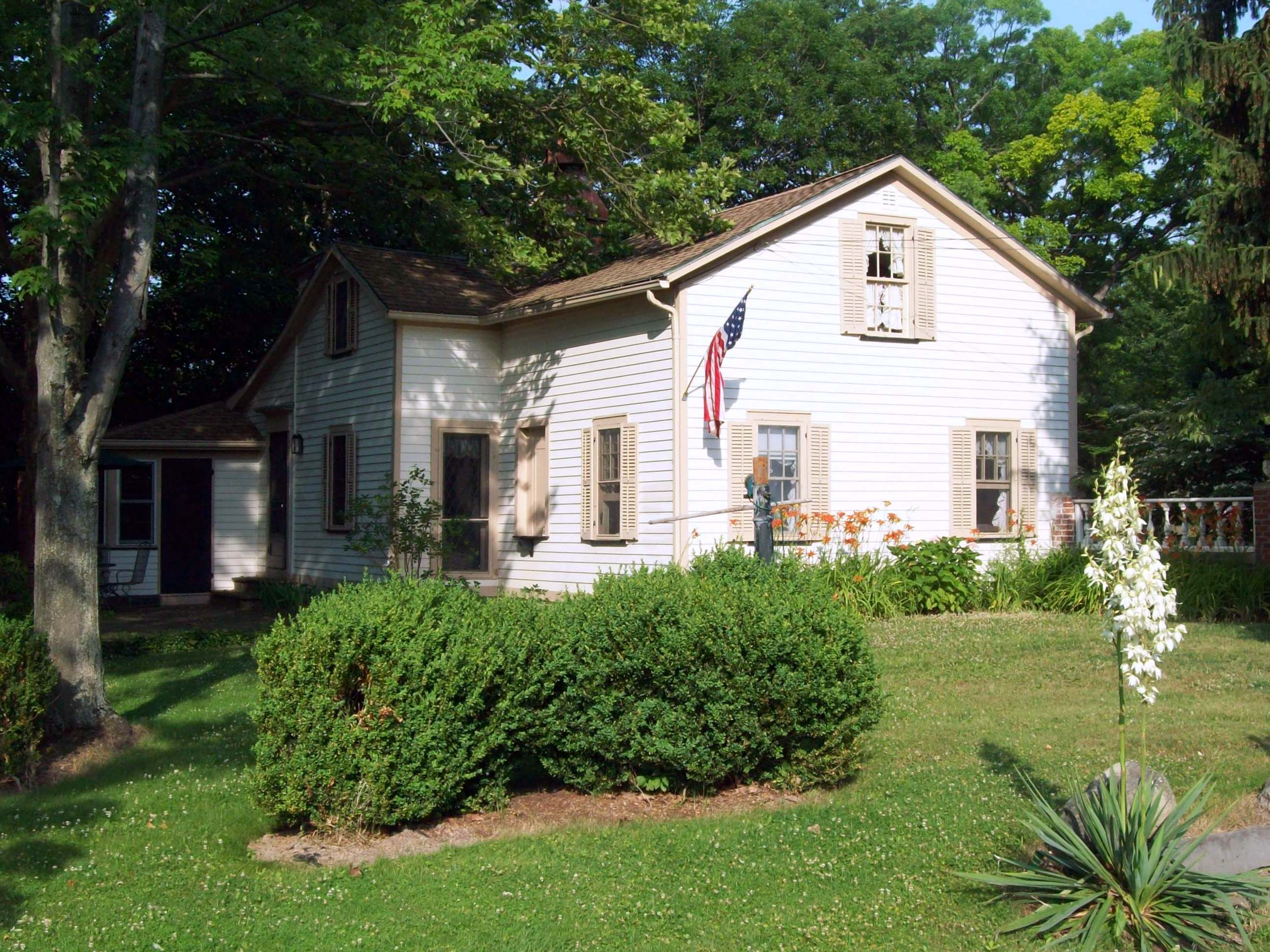
- Bryant Fleming House, July 2011

- Location within New York Location within the United States
- Location: 1024 Tower Road, Wyoming, New York
- Coordinates: 42°49′52.39″N 78°5′30.74″W
- Area: 11.2 acres (4.5 ha)
- Built: 1850
- Architectural style: Italianate
- NRHP reference No.: 09000838
- Added to NRHP: October 14, 2009

Bryant Fleming House is a historic home located at Wyoming in Wyoming County, New York. It was built about 1850 and is a 1 1/2-story, two-by-three-bay cross-gabled vernacular Italianate-style cottage with a two-by-three-bay, 1-story rear wing. Another main building is a multi-purpose "playhouse" designed for large-scale entertaining and accommodation of overnight guests. The property includes notable landscape features that its principal owner, Bryant Fleming (1877–1946) designed and installed after he purchased the property about 1910. Also on the property is a small decorative pool with fountain, two sets of stone and concrete steps, a garden gate, and brick walls with gate posts.

It was listed on the National Register of Historic Places in 2009.

== Gallery ==
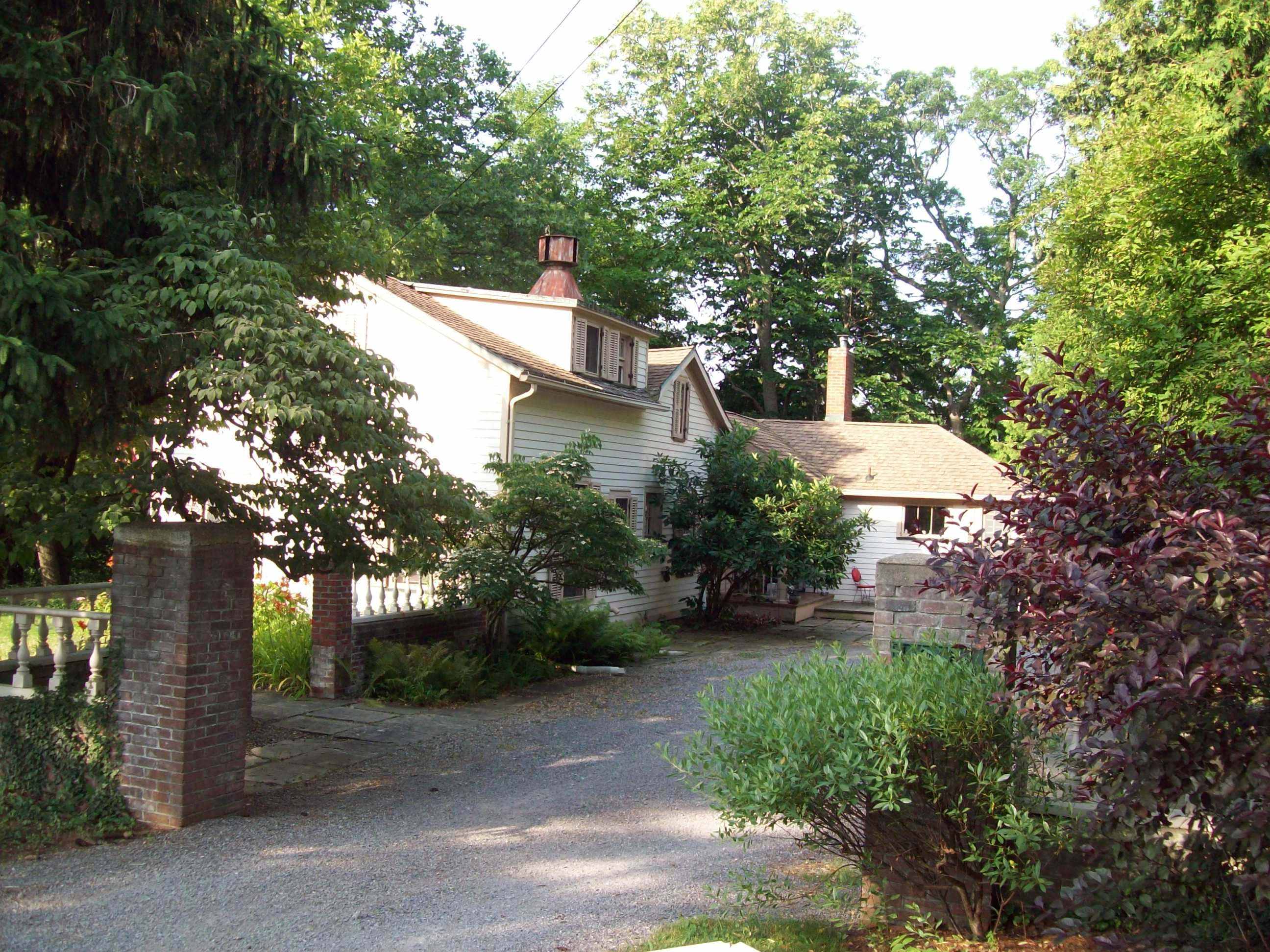
Bryant Fleming House, July 2011

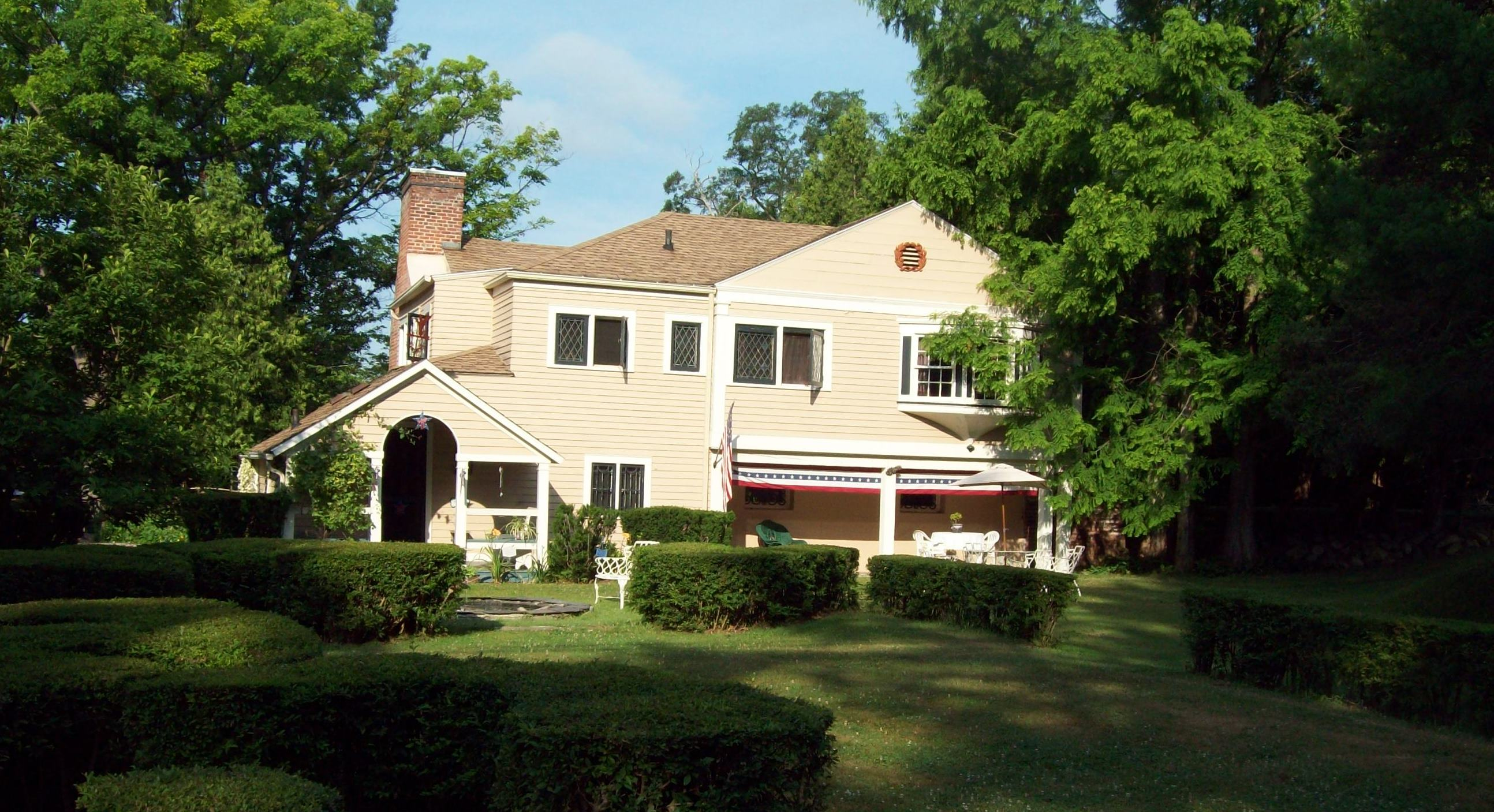
Bryant Fleming House - Playhouse, July 2011
