= Rotary Botanical Gardens =

Botanical garden in Janesville, Wisconsin, United States

Coordinates: 42°41′02″N 89°00′59″W

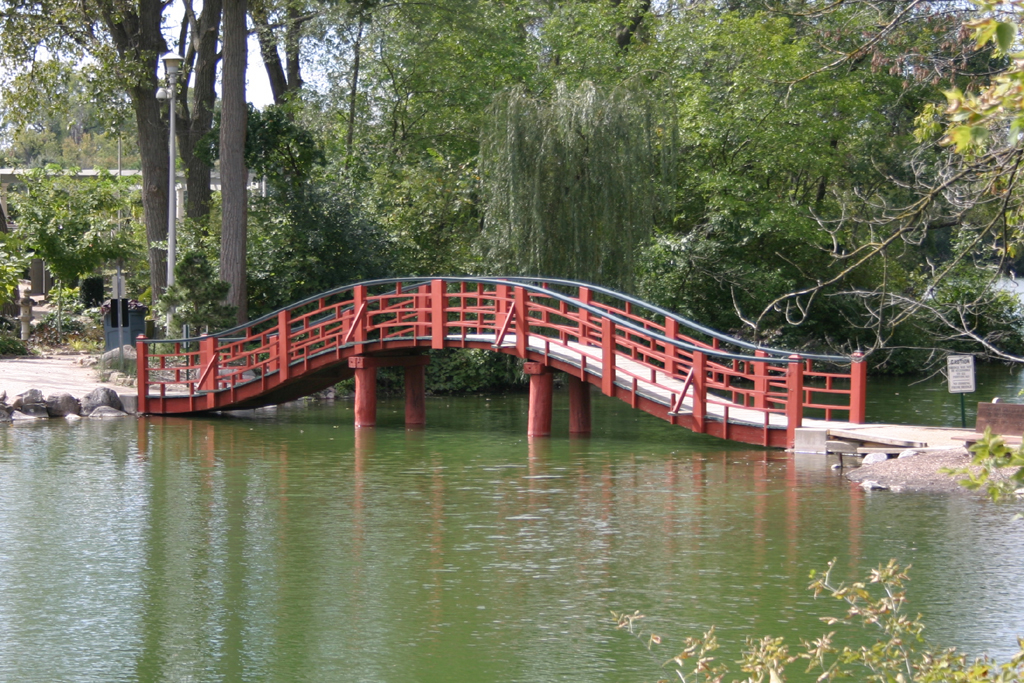
- Japanese Garden Arch Bridge
- Interactive map of Rotary Botanical Gardens
- Type: Botanical Garden
- Location: Janesville, Wisconsin, United States
- Area: 20 acres (8.1 ha)
- Opened: 1991
- Founder: Dr. Robert Yahr
- Owner: non-profit organization
- Collections: Hosta, Daylily
- Website: http://rotarybotanicalgardens.org/

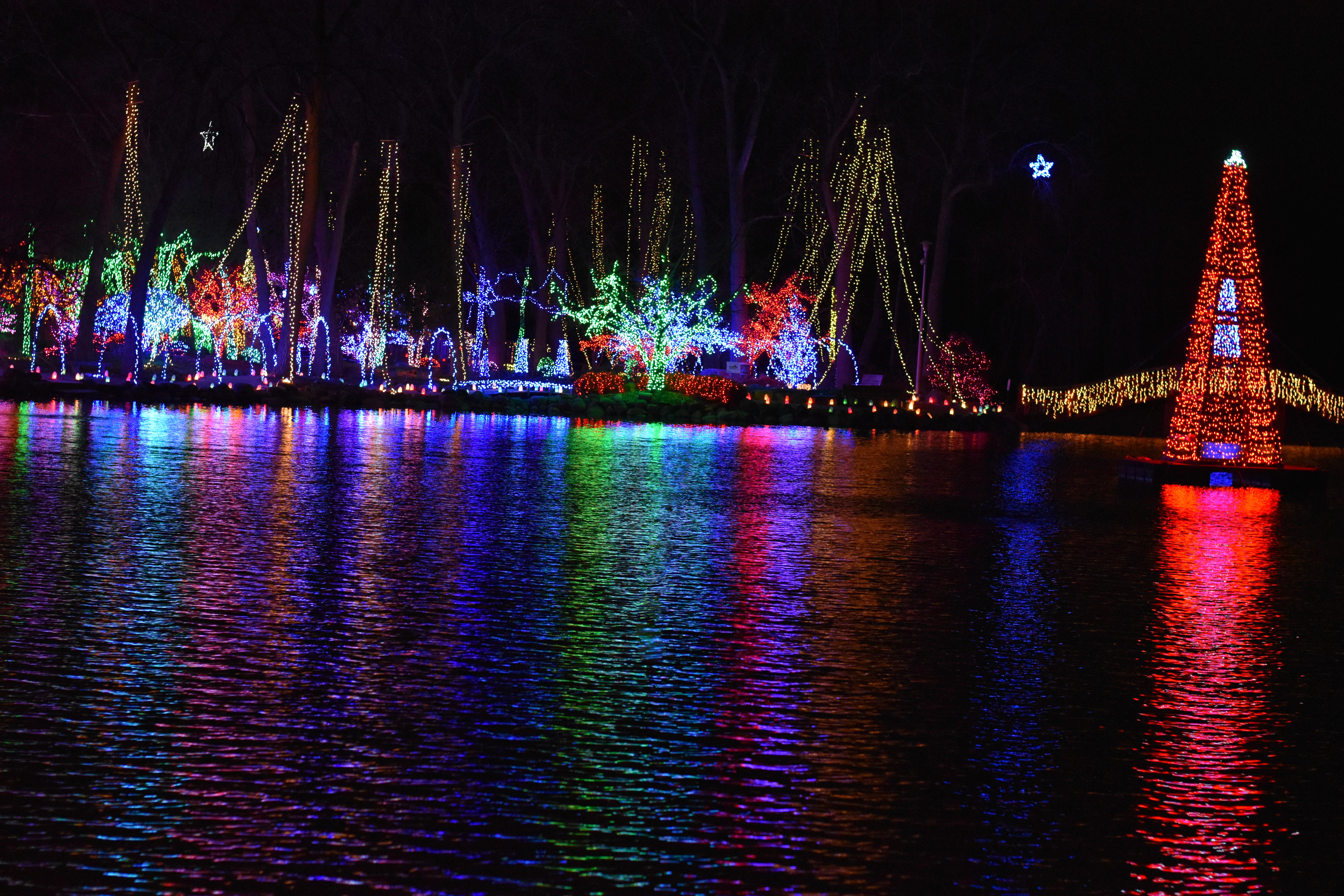
2020 Holiday Light Show view of the Japanese Garden from the Observation Pier

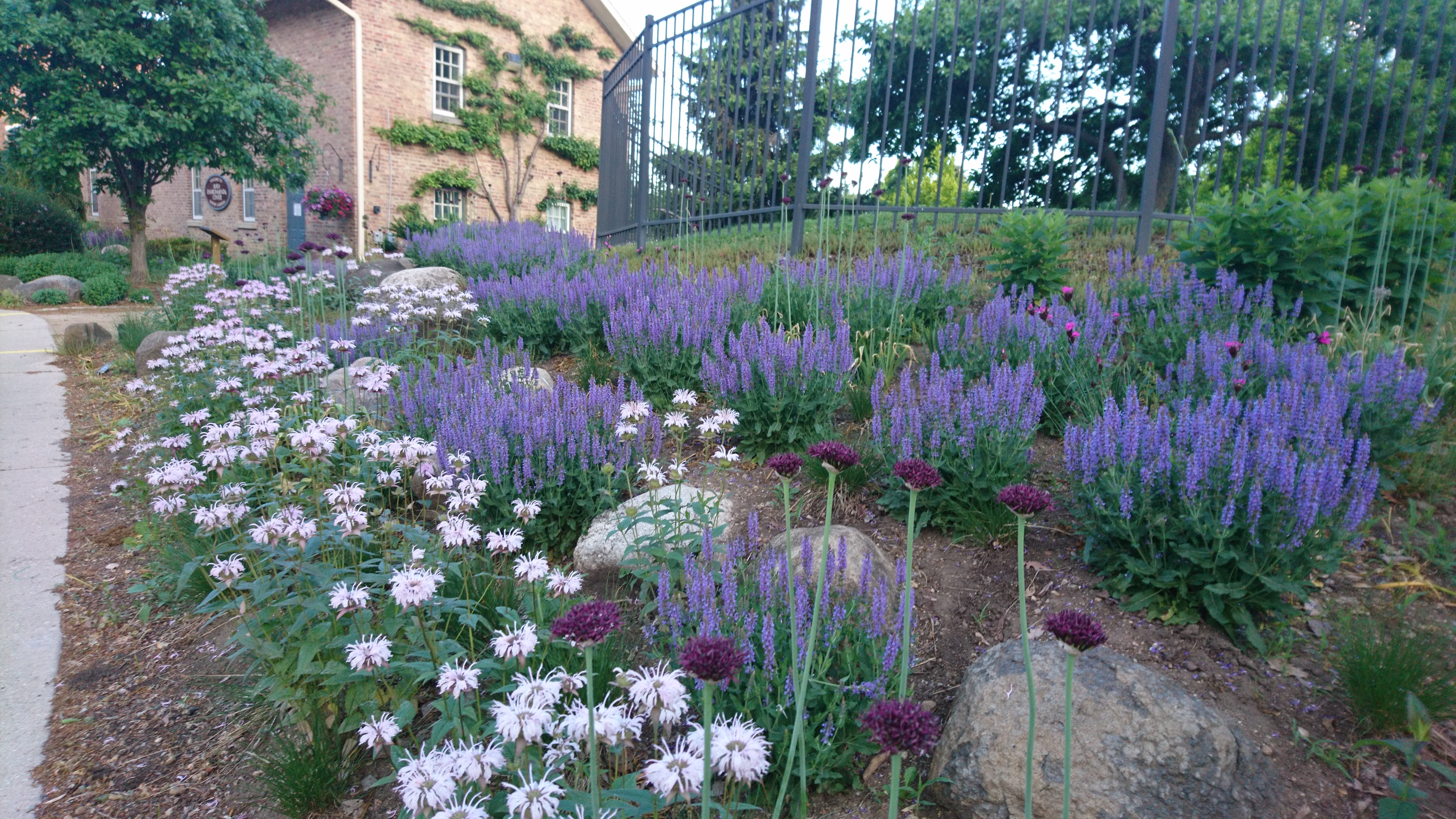
Perennials flower in front of the Visitor Center in May 2021.

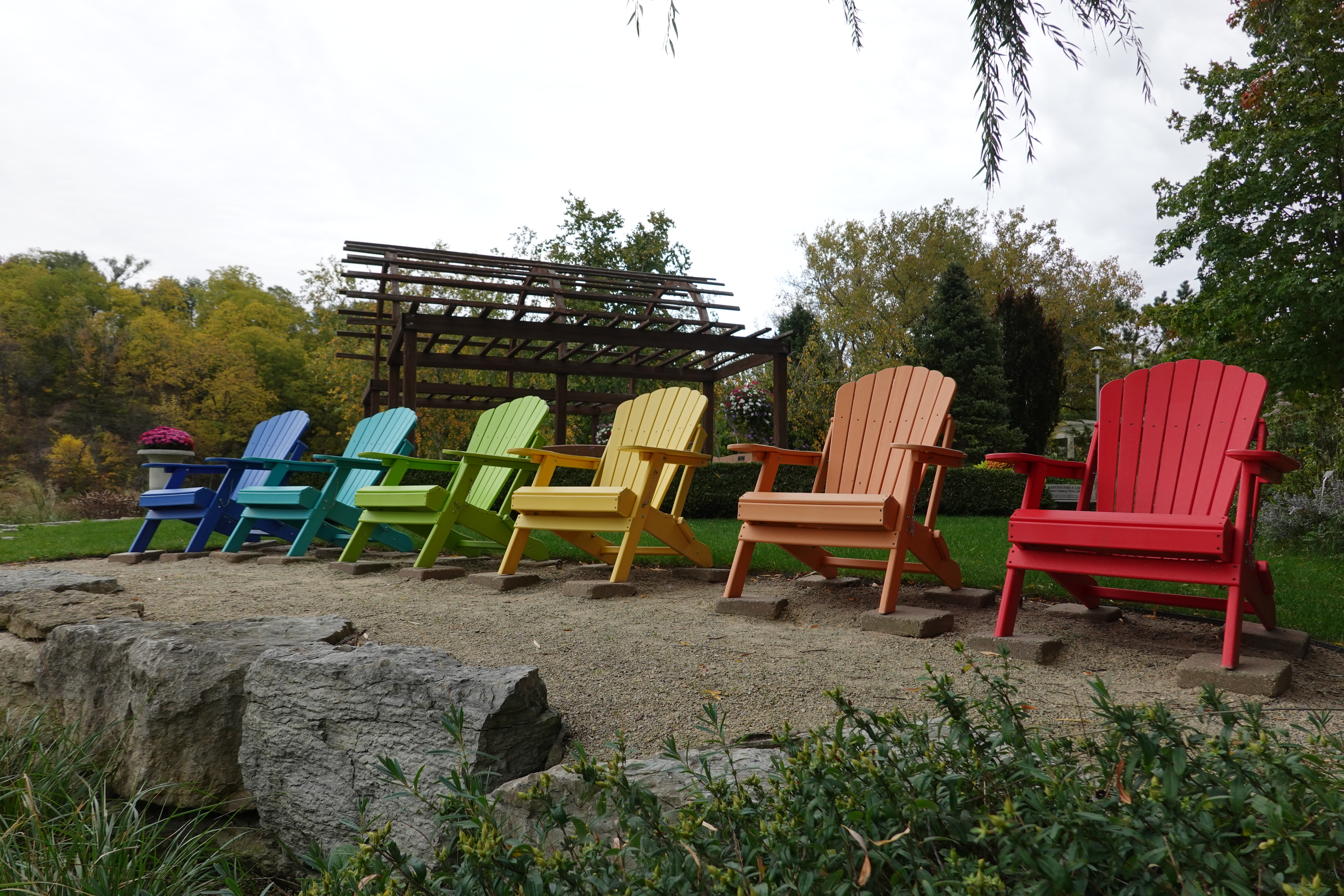
Rainbow themed Adirondack chairs overlook Kiwanis Pond.

Rotary Botanical Gardens is a non-profit 20-acre (81,000 m^{2}) botanical garden located at 1455 Palmer Drive in Janesville, Wisconsin, that is open to the public.

== Overview ==
The 20-acre site contains a number of themed gardens, including Japanese, Scottish, Rose, Italian, and English cottage gardens. The Japanese garden borders a pond that is spanned by a red Japanese-styled bridge. A sunken garden is surrounded by limestone walls and perennial plantings. Its entrance is a Tudor-style stone arch that was once the entrance to the Parker Pen Company's world headquarters formerly located in Janesville. There are also less formal gardens, such as a fern and moss garden, and shade, prairie, and woodland gardens.

Rotary Botanical Gardens is a self-sustaining non-profit organization. With over 100,000 visitors annually, it is the most frequented tourist destination in Rock County. It is also a popular site for weddings and receptions. The popular Holiday Light Show event started in 1996 and features over 1 million lights and has become a regional attraction.

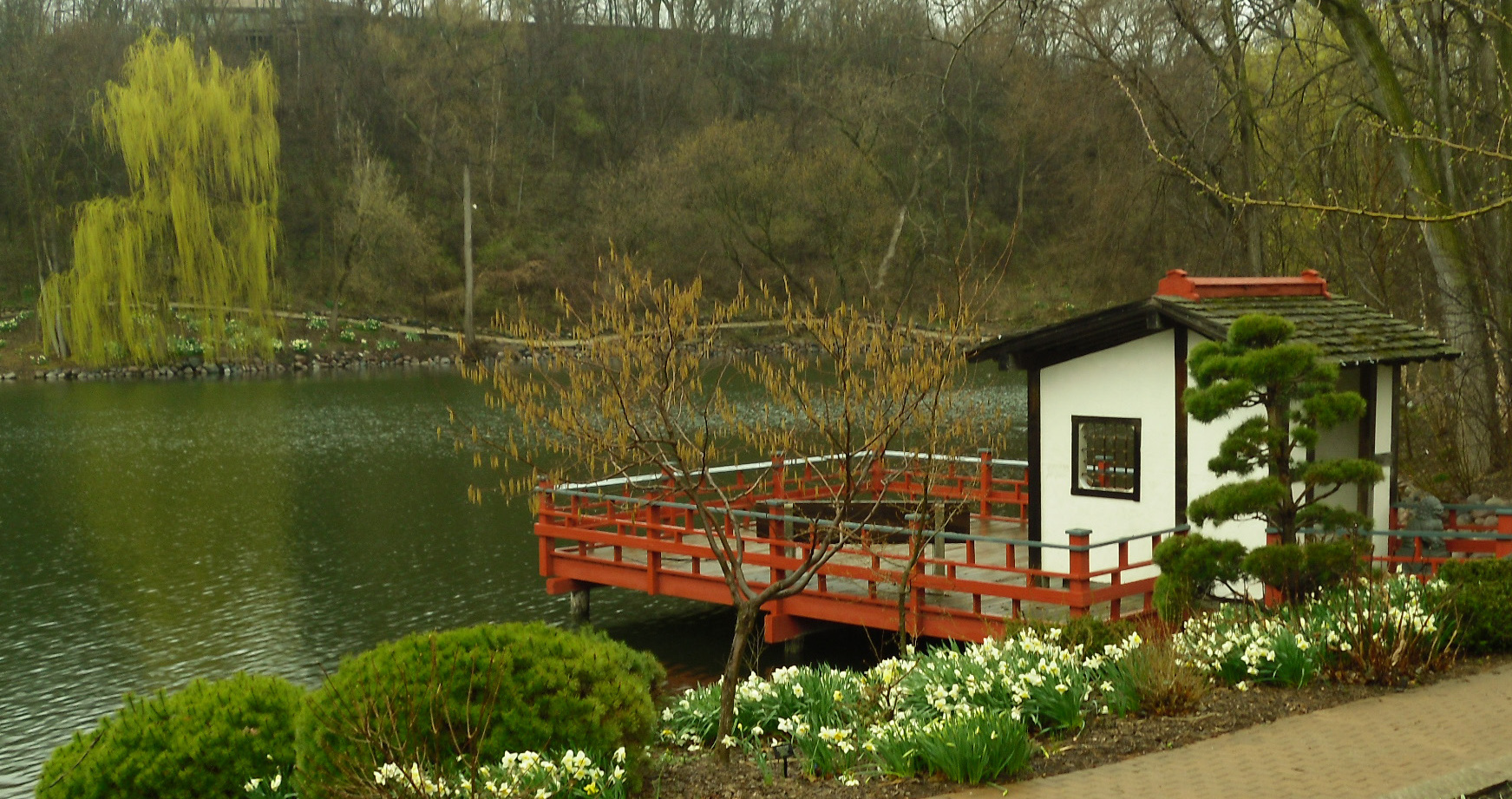
Pond and Japanese garden area, April 2011

== History ==
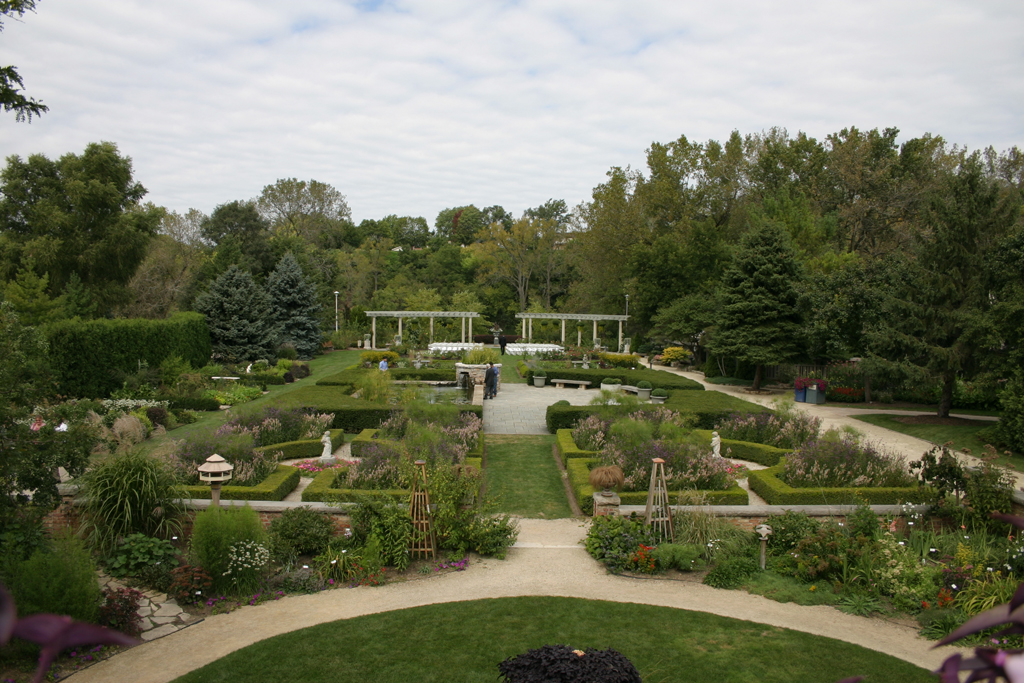
French, Italian, and herb gardens

Rotary Botanical Gardens was established in 1988 by Janesville Rotary Clubs on the grounds of a defunct sand and gravel quarry. Owned by the city, the site was filled with debris and equipment. The city leased the site to the Rotarians, who began a multi-year cleanup project. After tons of rubbish were removed, gardens, walkways, benches, and gazebos were added. A ramshackle building on the property was rehabilitated and turned into a visitors' and environmental center. In 2002, meeting rooms, classrooms, and a gift shop were added and an addition to the Rath Environmental Center was completed in 2005.

== Awards ==
- 2012 - First-place winner in category III of the All-America Selections (AAS) Landscape Design Contest
- 2013 - First-place winner in category III of the All-America Selections (AAS) Landscape Design Contest

== See also ==
- List of botanical gardens and arboretums in Wisconsin
