= Paine Art Center and Gardens =

Historic estate, art gallery, and gardens in Oshkosh, Wisconsin, United States

- Paine Art Center and Arboretum
- U.S. National Register of Historic Places
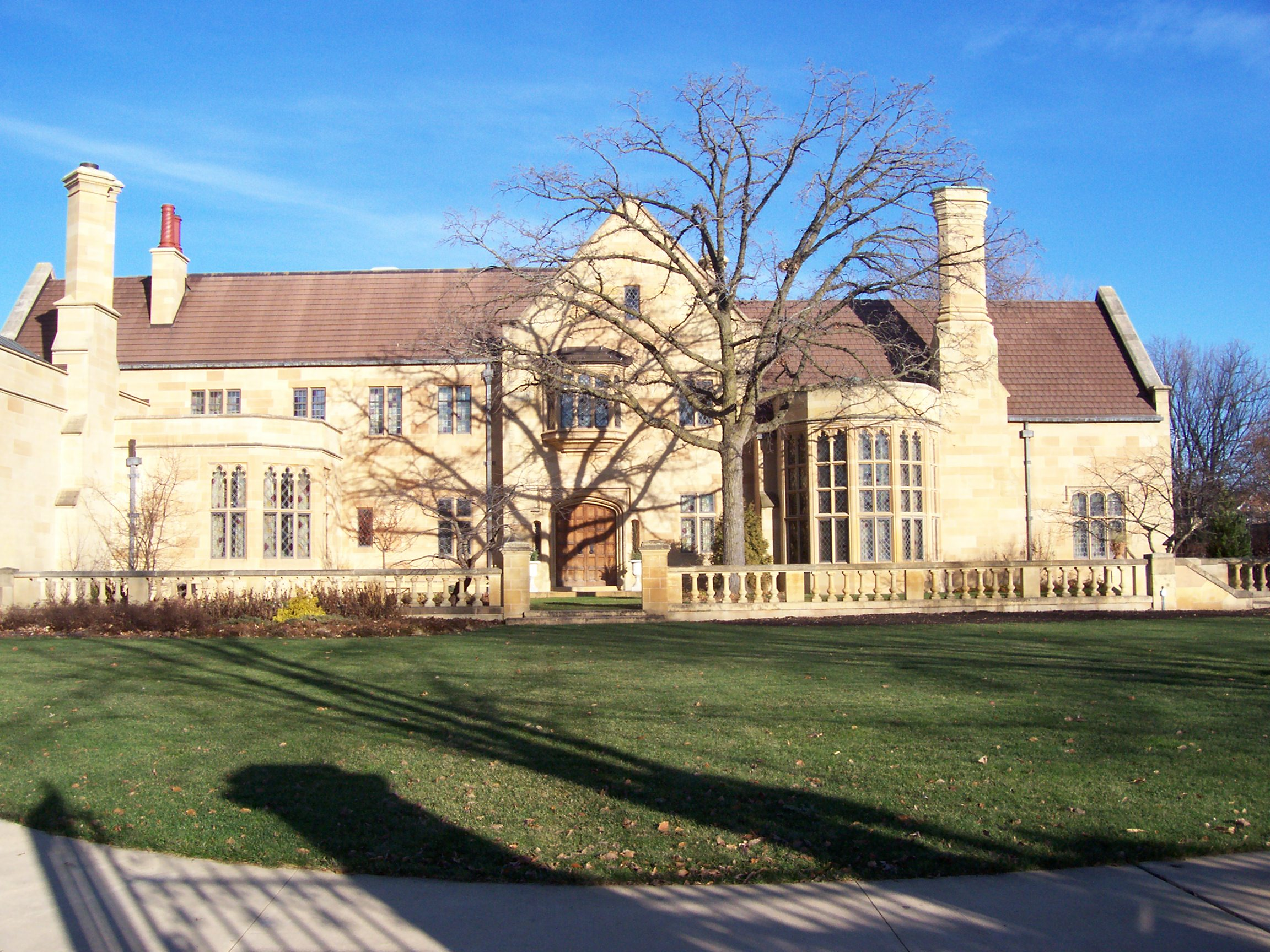
- Paine Art Center

- Location within Wisconsin Location within the United States
- Location: 1410 Algoma Blvd., Oshkosh, Wisconsin
- Coordinates: 44°2′7″N 88°33′30″W
- Area: 14.7 acres (5.9 ha)
- Built: 1927
- Architect: Bryant Fleming
- Architectural style: Tudor Revival; Late 19th and 20th Century Revivals; Tudor Gothic
- Website: www.thepaine.org
- NRHP reference No.: 78000152
- Added to NRHP: December 1, 1978

The Paine Art Center and Gardens is a preserved historic estate with a mansion and gardens located in Oshkosh, Wisconsin. It includes public art galleries and botanic gardens on 3 acres (1.2 ha), and is listed on the National Register of Historic Places.

== History ==
The Paine Mansion was built for lumber baron Nathan Paine and his wife, Jessie Kimberly Paine. In 1925, upon the recommendation of Mary K. Shirk (Jessie's sister), the Paines commissioned Bryant Fleming, an architect from Ithaca, New York, to design the estate. From the beginning, the Paines wanted to design an estate that would showcase exceptional architecture, furnishings, art and natural beauty, which would be open to the public for educational and cultural purposes.

Construction of the Tudor Revival style mansion began in 1927 and the exterior was completed by 1930. By 1932, when the Great Depression hit and crippled the Paine Lumber Company, all remaining work on the house came to a halt.

The Paines returned to the project in 1946 and established a non-profit organization to own and manage the estate for public benefit. Nathan Paine died in 1947 at the age of 77. Jessie oversaw the remaining work on the estate, and the property opened to the public in 1948. Until Jessie's death in 1973 at the age of 100, she served as the museum's president while residing in La Jolla, California. The Paines never lived in the mansion.

== Features ==
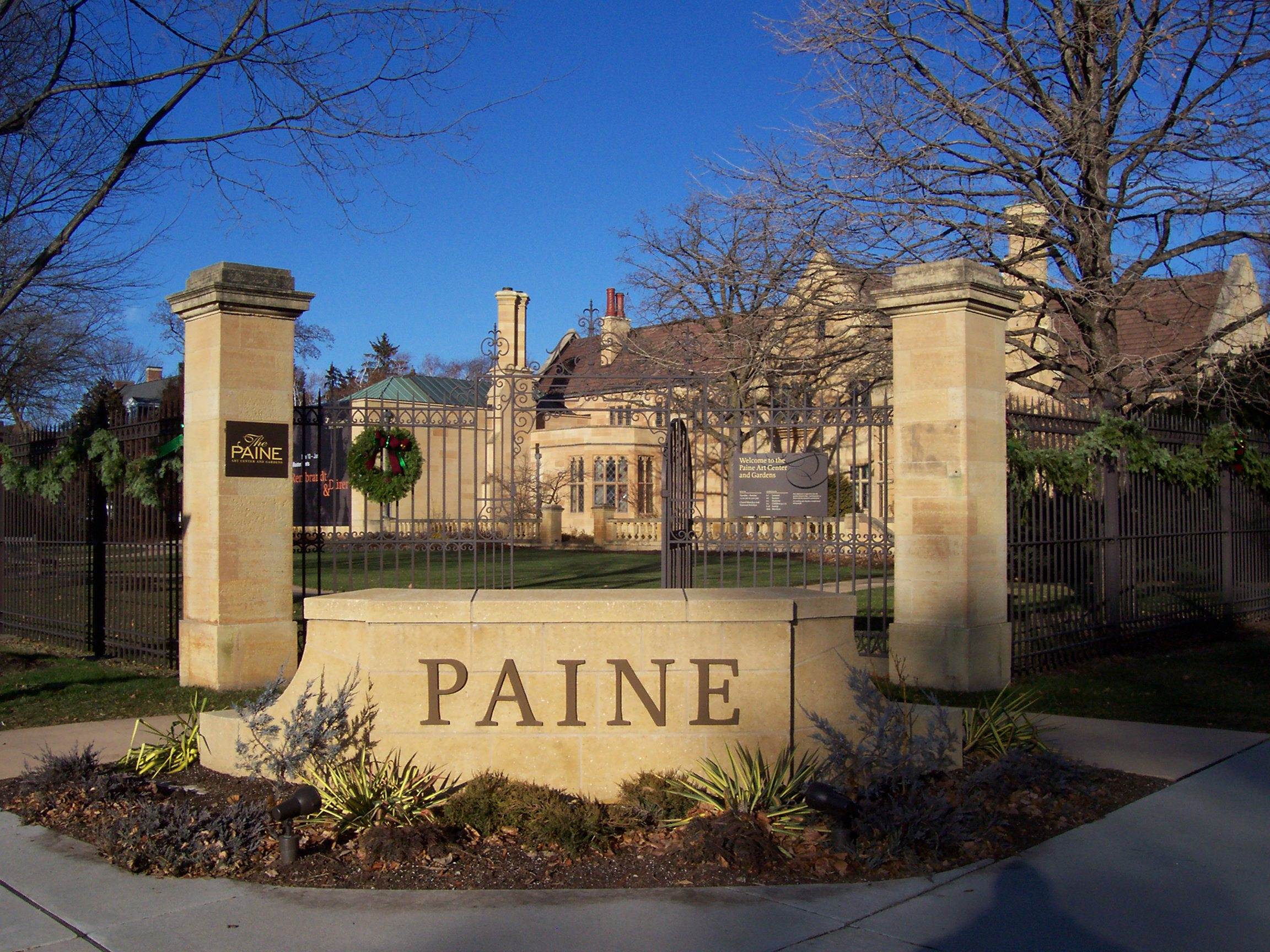
Entrance to the estate.

The Paine estate features a historic house museum with art gallery, and is surrounded by extensive gardens.

The house contains French Barbizon school and American paintings, sculptures, and decorative woodworkings, Persian rugs, tapestries, and English and American silver and china. The Paine Center hosts changing exhibitions and offers educational programs related to historic architecture, art, and to nature.

The estate's landscape gardens have twenty 'outdoor rooms' and designed areas, in various historical—traditional and contemporary themes. They feature thousands of different plant species, serving as a botanical garden.

The Paine Art Center and Gardens is located at 1410 Algoma Boulevard in Oshkosh. It is open Tuesday-Sunday throughout the year, and an admission fee is charged.

== See also ==
- List of botanical gardens and arboretums in Wisconsin
- Index: Gardens in Wisconsin
