= Scheig Center Gardens =

Botanical garden in Appleton, Wisconsin, United States

Coordinates: 44.2906°N 88.3851°W

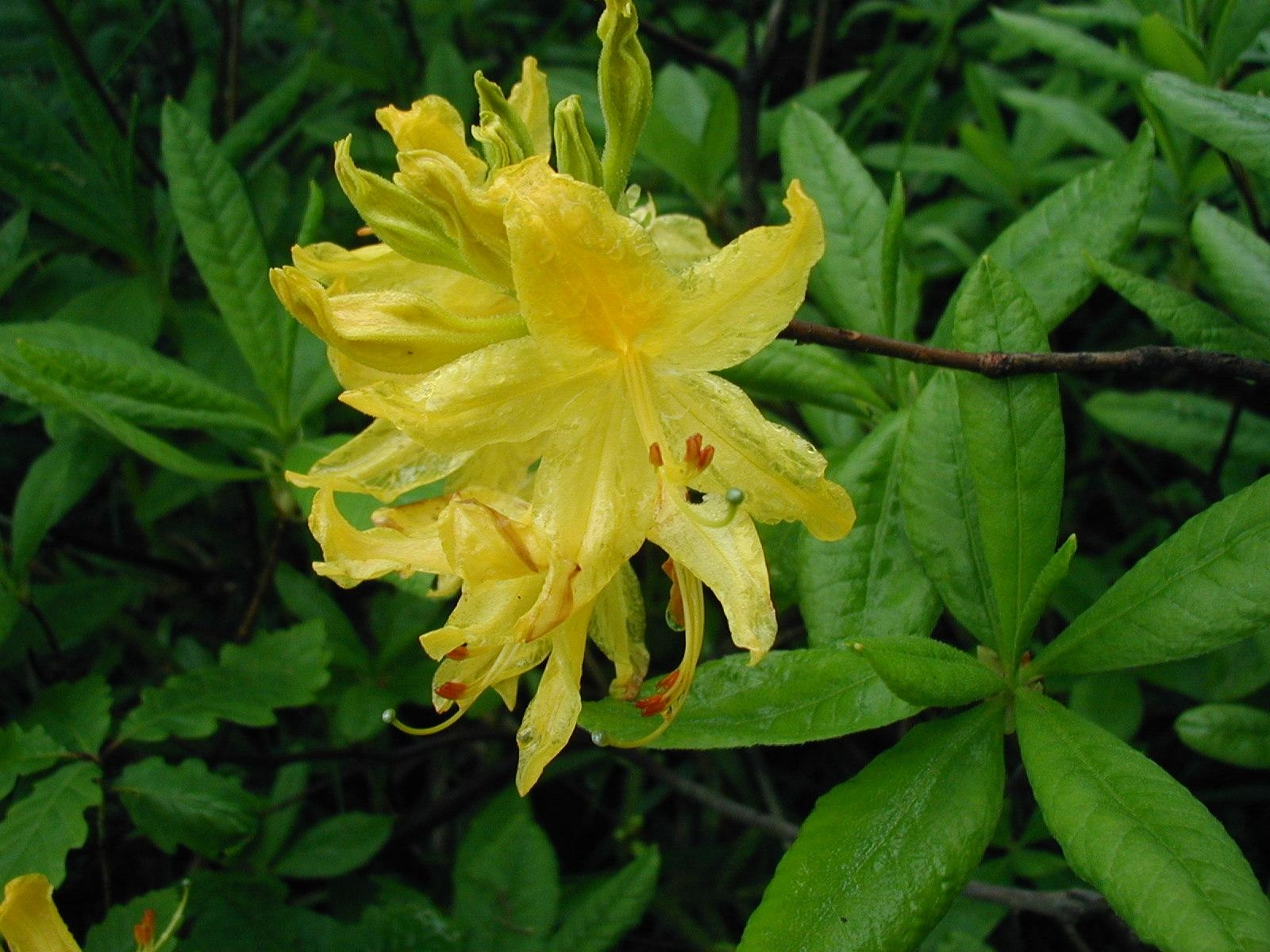
- Interactive map of Scheig Center Gardens
- Type: Botanical gardens, Arboretum
- Location: Appleton Memorial Park, 1313 Witzke Boulevard, Appleton, Wisconsin
- Area: 35 acres (14 ha)
- Website: Official website

Scheig Center Gardens (35 acres), formerly the Gardens of the Fox Cities, are botanical gardens and an arboretum located in Appleton Memorial Park and are managed by the city of Appleton, Wisconsin. The gardens are free and open daily to the public year round from 5 a.m. to 11 p.m. The gardens are home to the Scheig Center, a 190-person capacity venue available for reservation.

Garden displays and natural areas combine to showcase the seasonal beauty of plants and gardens in Wisconsin. The original purpose of the gardens was to help visitors learn and appreciate Wisconsin native plants and their environmental importance through education, protection, preservation, and propagation.

The gardens include paved paths, trails, ponds, perennial gardens, including three rose gardens, native wildflower gardens, a prairie, and a reforested area.

== History ==
In 1992, local naturalists formed the Friends of the Park, originally planning to construct an arboretum, similar to the Madison Arboretum. This idea shifted, and became the Henry and Mary Scheig Learning Center, named for the previous president of Aid Association for Lutherans (now Thrivent). The Gardens of the Fox Cities operated as a nonprofit organization and leased the 35 acre land and building for the gardens since 1994. In May 2006, the Gardens announced a long-term expansion project. The plan would include the addition of, among other things, a rose garden, perennial garden, bird meadow, serenity garden, and outdoor amphitheater. On January 24, 2014, the gardens closed due to financial and staffing issues, and in February, the Gardens of the Fox Cities lease was terminated. In May the gardens reopened, and in August, the gardens were officially renamed the Scheig Center Gardens.

== See also ==
- List of botanical gardens and arboretums in Wisconsin
