= Foxfire Botanical Gardens =

Former botanical garden in Marshfield, Wisconsin, United States

Coordinates: 44.7343°N 90.1696°W

The Foxfire Botanical Gardens (or Foxfire Gardens) were 15 acres of botanical gardens located on the outskirts of Marshfield, Wisconsin, United States.

Founded in 1983, these philosophical gardens were the first of their kind. Seven of its acres have been cultivated into Eastern and Western style display gardens, ranging from European topiary to Japanese so and gyo gardens. In 2003, the site was granted botanical garden status by the state of Wisconsin after fulfilling requirements in both display garden criteria and community programs.

The gardens closed in 2009 after a civil jury awarded a substantial judgment against the owners in connection with business dealings unrelated to the gardens.

== See also ==
- List of botanical gardens and arboretums in Wisconsin
