= Middlebury, New York =

- Town
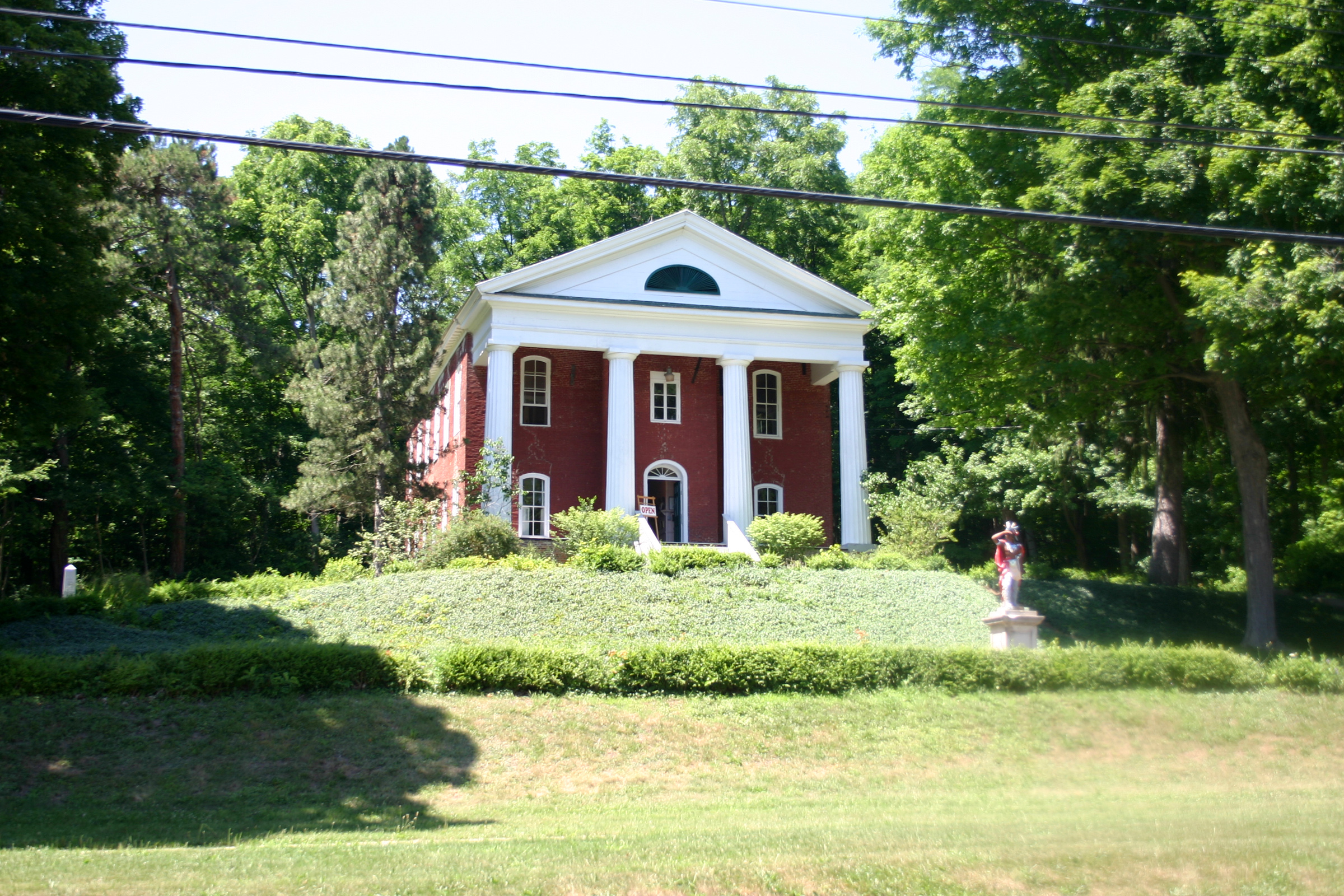
- Middlebury Academy: first high school in the Holland Purchase, now listed in the National Register of Historic Places is in Wyoming, New York

- Location within Wyoming County and New York
- Coordinates: 42°49′29″N 78°8′4″W
- Country: United States
- State: New York
- County: Wyoming

Area
  - Total: 35.67 sq mi (92.38 km^{2})
  - Land: 35.64 sq mi (92.31 km^{2})
  - Water: 0.023 sq mi (0.06 km^{2})
- Elevation: 1,572 ft (479 m)

Population (2010)
  - Total: 1,441
  - Estimate (2016): 1,390
  - Density: 39.0/sq mi (15.06/km^{2})
- Time zone: UTC-5 (Eastern (EST))
  - Summer (DST): UTC-4 (EDT)
- FIPS code: 36-46877
- GNIS feature ID: 0979213
- Website: Town of Middlebury

Middlebury is an incorporated town in Wyoming County, New York. The population was 1,508 at the 2000 census. The town is on the north border of the county.

== History ==
The Town of Middlebury was formed in 1812 from the Town of Warsaw.

== Geography ==
According to the United States Census Bureau, the town has a total area of 35.7 square miles (92 km^{2}), of which 35.7 square miles (92 km^{2})is land and 0.04 square miles (0.10 km^{2}) (0.08%) is water.

Oatka Creek flows through the southeast corner of the town.

The north town line is the border of Genesee County.

== Demographics ==
Historical population
Census	Pop.	Note	%±
1820	1,782		—
1830	2,415		35.5%
1840	2,445		1.2%
1850	1,799		−26.4%
1860	1,708		−5.1%
1870	1,620		−5.2%
1880	1,822		12.5%
1890	1,781		−2.3%
1900	1,406		−21.1%
1910	1,395		−0.8%
1920	1,204		−13.7%
1930	1,091		−9.4%
1940	1,123		2.9%
1950	1,248		11.1%
1960	1,416		13.5%
1970	1,503		6.1%
1980	1,561		3.9%
1990	1,532		−1.9%
2000	1,508		−1.6%
2010	1,441		−4.4%
2016 (est.)	1,390		−3.5%
U.S. Decennial Census

As of the census of 2000, there were 1,508 people, 530 households, and 413 families residing in the town. The population density was 42.3 inhabitants per square mile (16.3/km^{2}). There were 554 housing units at an average density of 15.5 per square mile (6.0/km^{2}). The racial makeup of the town was 98.01% White, 0.33% African American, 0.53% Native American, 0.07% Asian, 0.33% from other races, and 0.73% from two or more races. Hispanic or Latino of any race were 0.33% of the population.

There were 530 households, out of which 38.3% had children under the age of 18 living with them, 66.8% were married couples living together, 7.4% had a female householder with no husband present, and 21.9% were non-families. 17.4% of all households were made up of individuals, and 7.5% had someone living alone who was 65 years of age or older. The average household size was 2.84 and the average family size was 3.21.

In the town, the population was spread out, with 28.7% under the age of 18, 6.4% from 18 to 24, 29.6% from 25 to 44, 22.6% from 45 to 64, and 12.7% who were 65 years of age or older. The median age was 37 years. For every 100 females, there were 102.7 males. For every 100 females age 18 and over, there were 98.0 males.

The median income for a household in the town was $43,125, and the median income for a family was $48,000. Males had a median income of $36,667 versus $23,882 for females. The per capita income for the town was $17,032. About 4.2% of families and 5.3% of the population were below the poverty line, including 3.6% of those under age 18 and 5.2% of those age 65 or over.

== Communities and locations in Middlebury ==
- Belknap Crossing – A hamlet in the northwest corner of the town.
- Dale – a hamlet on the west border of the town.
- Ewells Corners – A hamlet west of Wyoming village.
- Lamb's Corners – A hamlet on the town line east of Wyoming Village on Lamb Road.
- Millers Corners – A hamlet west of Wyoming village.
- Millers Crossing – A location south of Dale.
- Thompsons Crossing – A location on the south town line.
- Vernal Corners – A hamlet in the northwest corner of the town.
- Wrights Corners – A hamlet in the northeast corner of town.
- West Middlebury – A hamlet on the north border of town, east of Belknap Crossing.
- Wyoming – A village located on the eastern side of the town.
