= List of botanical gardens and arboretums in Wisconsin =

This list of botanical gardens and arboretums in Wisconsin is intended to include all significant botanical gardens and arboretums in the U.S. state of Wisconsin.

Name	Image	Affiliation	City
Boerner Botanical Gardens			Hales Corners
Cofrin Memorial Arboretum		University of Wisconsin	Green Bay
Foxfire Botanical Gardens			Marshfield
Gardens of the Fox Cities			Appleton
The Garden Door			Sevastopol
Green Bay Botanical Garden			Green Bay
Second Nature at Reads Creek			Readstown
Ledge View Nature Center			Chilton
Mitchell Park Horticultural Conservatory			Milwaukee
Norskedalen			Coon Valley
Olbrich Botanical Gardens			Madison
Paine Art Center and Gardens			Oshkosh
Rotary Botanical Gardens			Janesville
Schmeeckle Reserve			Stevens Point
University of Wisconsin–Madison Arboretum		University of Wisconsin	Madison
University of Wisconsin–Madison Botany Garden and Greenhouse		University of Wisconsin	Madison

== See also ==
- List of botanical gardens and arboretums in the United States
