= Second Nature at Reads Creek =

Botanical garden in Readstown, Wisconsin, United States

Coordinates: 43°27′55.8″N 90°49′06.3″W

Second Nature at Reads Creek, previously known as Reads Creek Nursery and Jones Arboretum and Botanical Gardens, is a plant nursery run by Dave and Jen Tubbin west of Readstown, Wisconsin, United States located along U.S. Route 14. The property includes the nursery itself and the original home where previous owners lived. The southern half includes a barn, house, and a tobacco shed.

== History ==
The nursery was previously owned by Lisa and Bill Ashley-Kappler. The farm used to be run as the Black Bottom Stock and Grain Farm in the late 19th and early 20th century.

The community arboretum was established in 1973 by Royce Jones (a nuclear engineer) and Fran Jones, in conjunction with a tree nursery and his own gardens. After his retirement, it now features more than 100 kinds of trees, as well as some 700 non-woody plants, including 400 perennials. The plants are available for sale or garden display.

Jones Arboretum was purchased by Bill Kappler in 1992. Kappler renamed the business Reed's Creek Nursery in 2000, stating this was due to the business previously being mistaken for a nature reserve.

The nursery was severely damaged during flooding in September 2016.

== See also ==
- List of botanical gardens and arboretums in Wisconsin
