= Green Bay Botanical Garden =

Botanical garden in Green Bay, Wisconsin, United States

Coordinates: 44.5316°N 88.0990°W

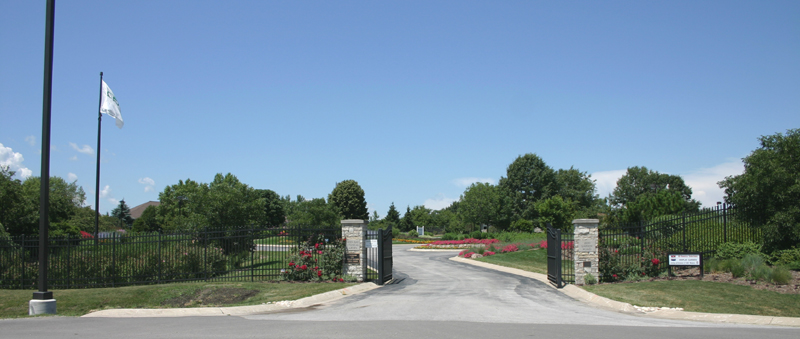
- Main entrance.
- Interactive map of Green Bay Botanical Garden
- Type: Botanical garden
- Location: 2600 Larsen Road, Green Bay, Wisconsin
- Area: 47 acres (19 ha)
- Website: www.gbbg.org

Green Bay Botanical Garden (47 acres) is a nonprofit botanical garden located at 2600 Larsen Road, Green Bay, Wisconsin. It is open daily in the warmer months, or weekdays in the colder months; an admission fee is charged. The gardens opened in 1996 on a site that was previously Larsen Orchard.

== Gardens ==
As of 2017, the gardens include:

- Donald J. Schneider Family Grand Garden - with an overlook arbor opening to the Billie Kress Amphitheater with a grand stage and grassy seating for over 1,500 people, a classroom with bathrooms, a catering kitchen to the west, and the Matthew Schmidt Garden featuring the Wangerin Pavilion to the east
- Agnes Schneider Terrace - perennial flowers and ornamental grasses.
- Four Seasons Garden - a garden with winter interest, featuring magnolias, crabapples, lilacs, and perennials.
- Gertrude B. Nielsen Children's Garden - children's garden, with a tree house, slide, maze, and sundial.
- Kaftan Lusthaus - a summerhouse of Scandinavian design.
- Mabel Thome Fountain & Garden - a fountain ringed with crabapples and annuals.
- Marguerite Kress Oval - a rose garden of contemporary design.
- John and Janet Van Den Wymelenberg Color and Foliage Garden - trees, shrubs, grasses, perennials, and vines with varied foliage (yellow, maroon, chartreuse, gray, and green).
- Larsen Orchard Remnant - apple trees, with an underplanting of spring-flowering bulbs.
- Mary Hendrickson Johnson Wisconsin Woodland Garden - an informal garden of native trees, shrubs and wild flowers surrounding a lawn for social gatherings.
- Schierl Wellhouse and Garden - The garden's well, and a garden of annuals and herbs.
- Stumpf Belvedere - a gazebo in early Greek style.
- Upper Rose Garden - a rose garden of hardy shrubs and hybrid tea roses.
- Vanderperren English Cottage Garden - a Wisconsin interpretation of an English cottage garden.

During the winter months, the garden hosts the WPS Garden of Lights, a display of over 200,000 holiday lights.

== Gallery ==
Thome Fountain

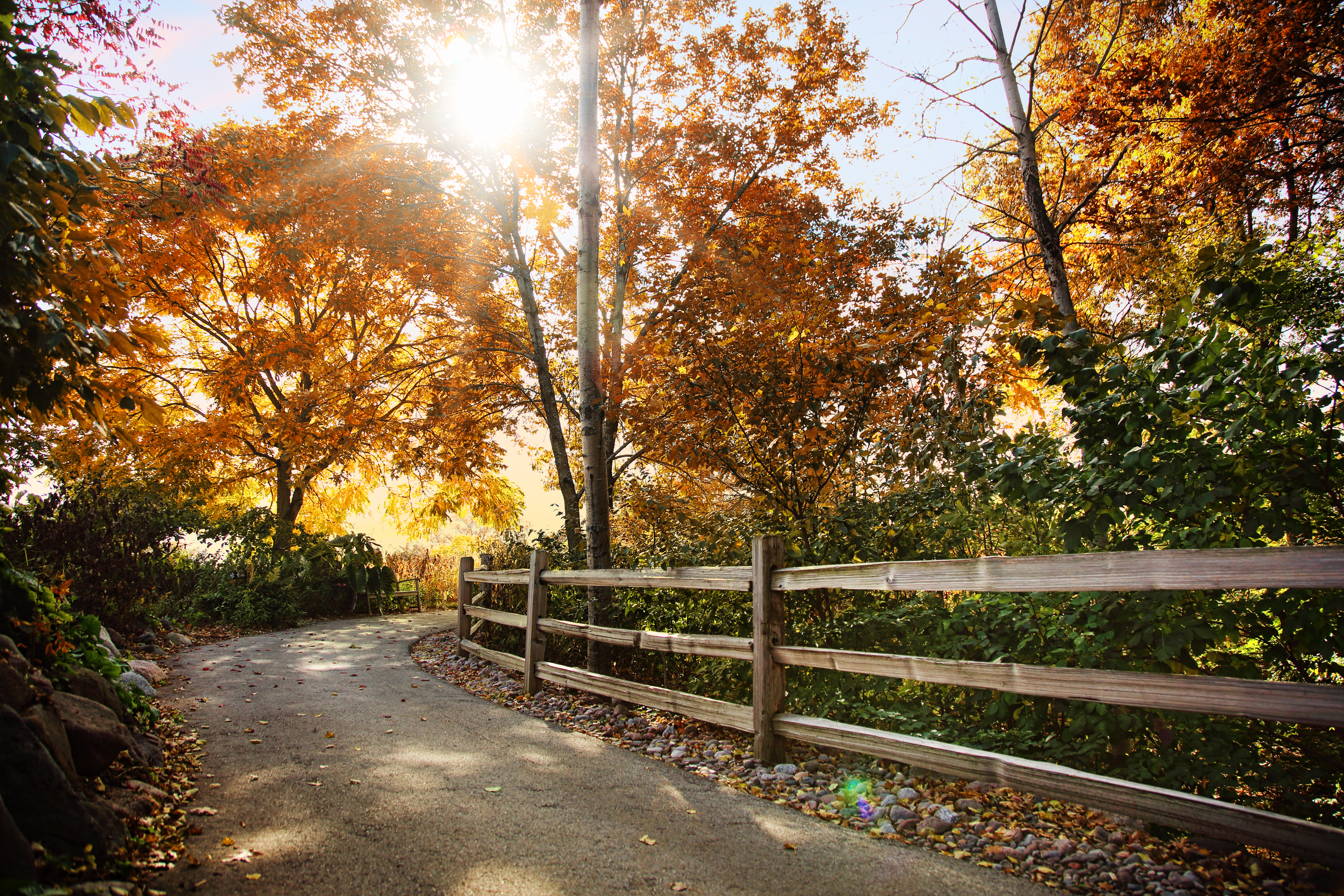
A walking path in Autumn

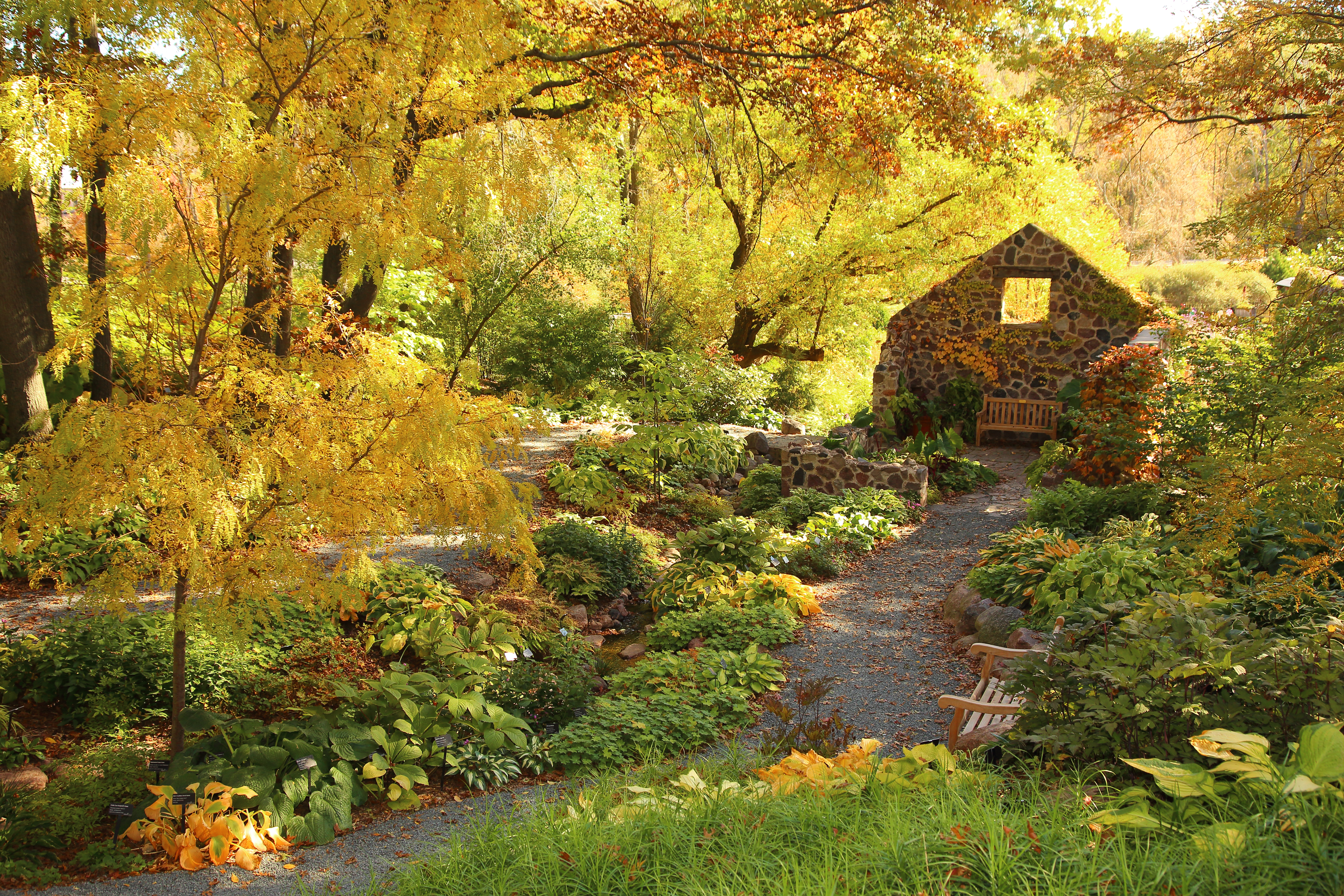
Spring House Ruin

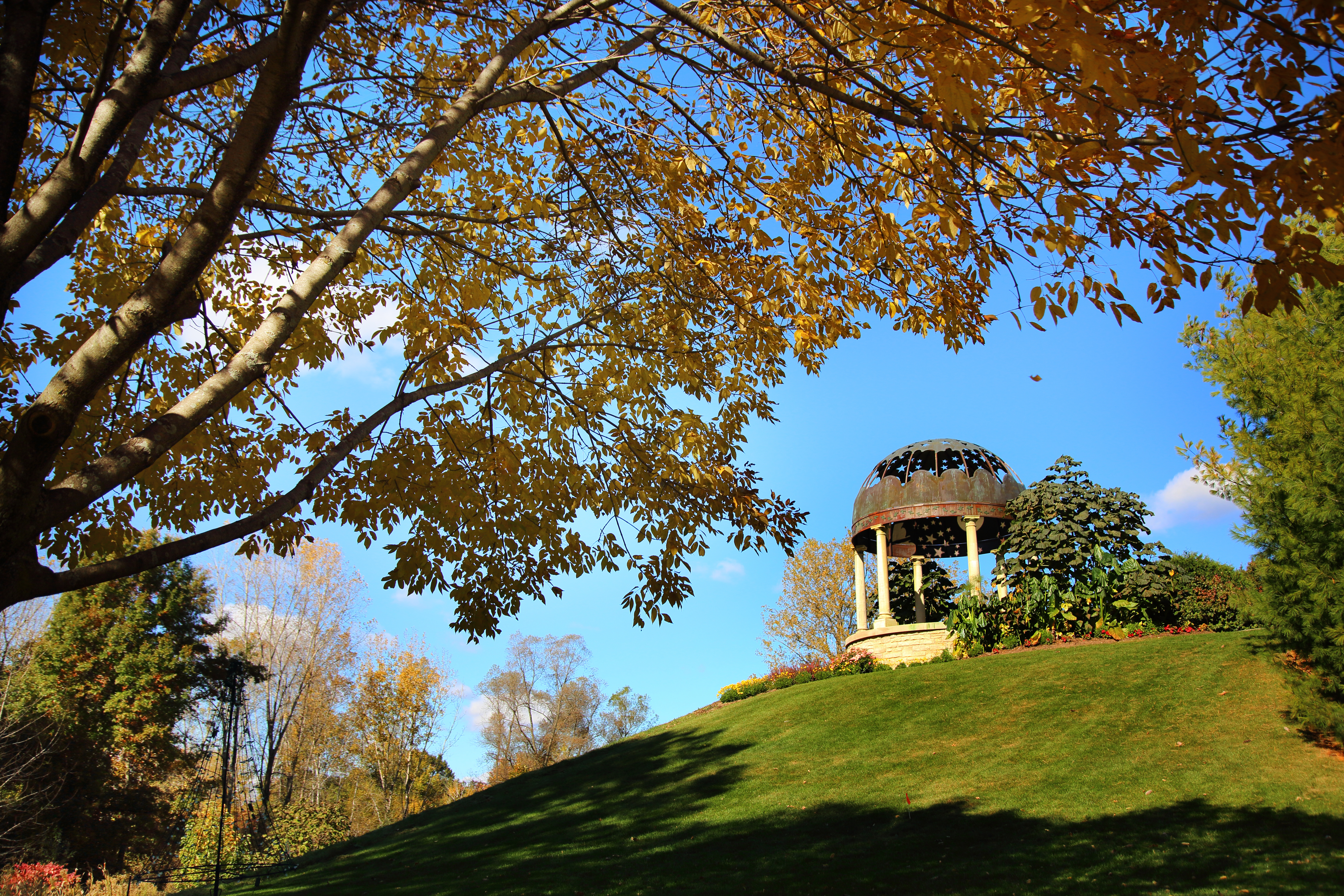
Stumpf Belvedere

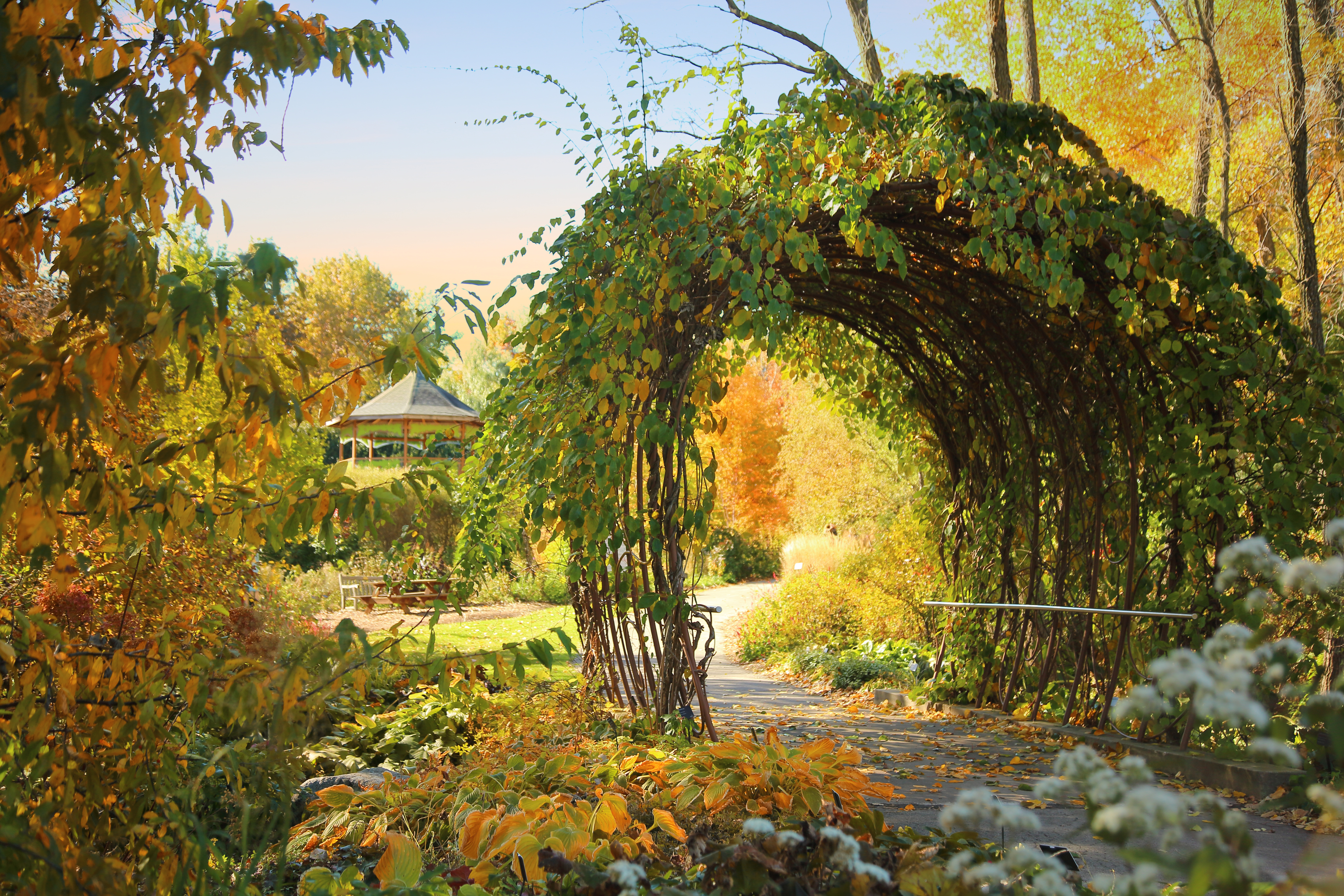
Betty Meyer Bridge

== See also ==
- List of botanical gardens and arboretums in Wisconsin
