= Henry Augustus Ward =

American naturalist

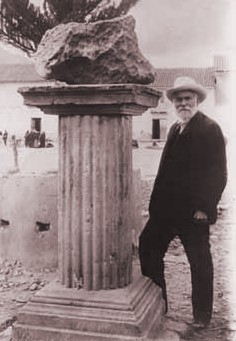
- Ward in 1906 with the Santa Rosa meteorite
- Born: March 9, 1834; Rochester, New York, U.S.
- Died: July 4, 1906 (aged 72); Buffalo, New York, U.S.
- Resting place: Mount Hope Cemetery, Rochester, New York
- Occupations: Geologist; naturalist
- Known for: Ward's Natural Science
- Spouse: Phoebe Howell (m. 1860; died 1891) Lydia Avery Coonley (m. 1897)

Henry Augustus Ward (March 9, 1834 – July 4, 1906) was an American naturalist and geologist.

== Biography ==
Henry Augustus Ward was born in Rochester, New York on May 19. 1834. After attending Williams College and the Lawrence School, Harvard, where he was an assistant of Louis Agassiz, he traveled in Egypt, Arabia, and Palestine, and studied at the Jardin des Plantes, the Sorbonne, and the School of Mines in Paris, and at the universities of Munich and Freiberg. Subsequently, he traveled in West Africa and the West Indies, making natural history collections.

In 1860, he returned to Rochester, where he was a professor at the University of Rochester until 1865. In Rochester, he founded Ward's Natural Science Establishment, a pioneering enterprise that collected and prepared taxidermy, fossils, and other animal remains from all parts of the world for sale to colleges, universities, museums, and private collectors.

He published:

- Notices of the Megatherium Cuvieri (1863)
- Descriptions of the Most Celebrated Fossil Animals in the Royal Museums of Europe (1866)

In 1897, he married a widow, Lydia Avery Coonley, (1845–1924), president of the Chicago Woman's Club in 1895-96, who wrote Under the Pines, and other Verses (1895); Singing Verses for Children (1897); Love Songs (1898).

He died on July 4, 1906, after being struck by a motorist in Buffalo, New York, becoming Buffalo's first automobile related fatality. His ashes were interred in Mount Hope Cemetery in a niche in his granite monument. Subsequently the ashes were stolen. His monument is surmounted by a glacial erratic boulder which shows jasper inclusions. He found the boulder north of Georgian Bay, Ontario, Canada. Ward's brain was contributed to the Wilder Brain Collection at Cornell University.
