= Schmeeckle Reserve =

Natural land area in Stevens Point, Wisconsin, U.S.

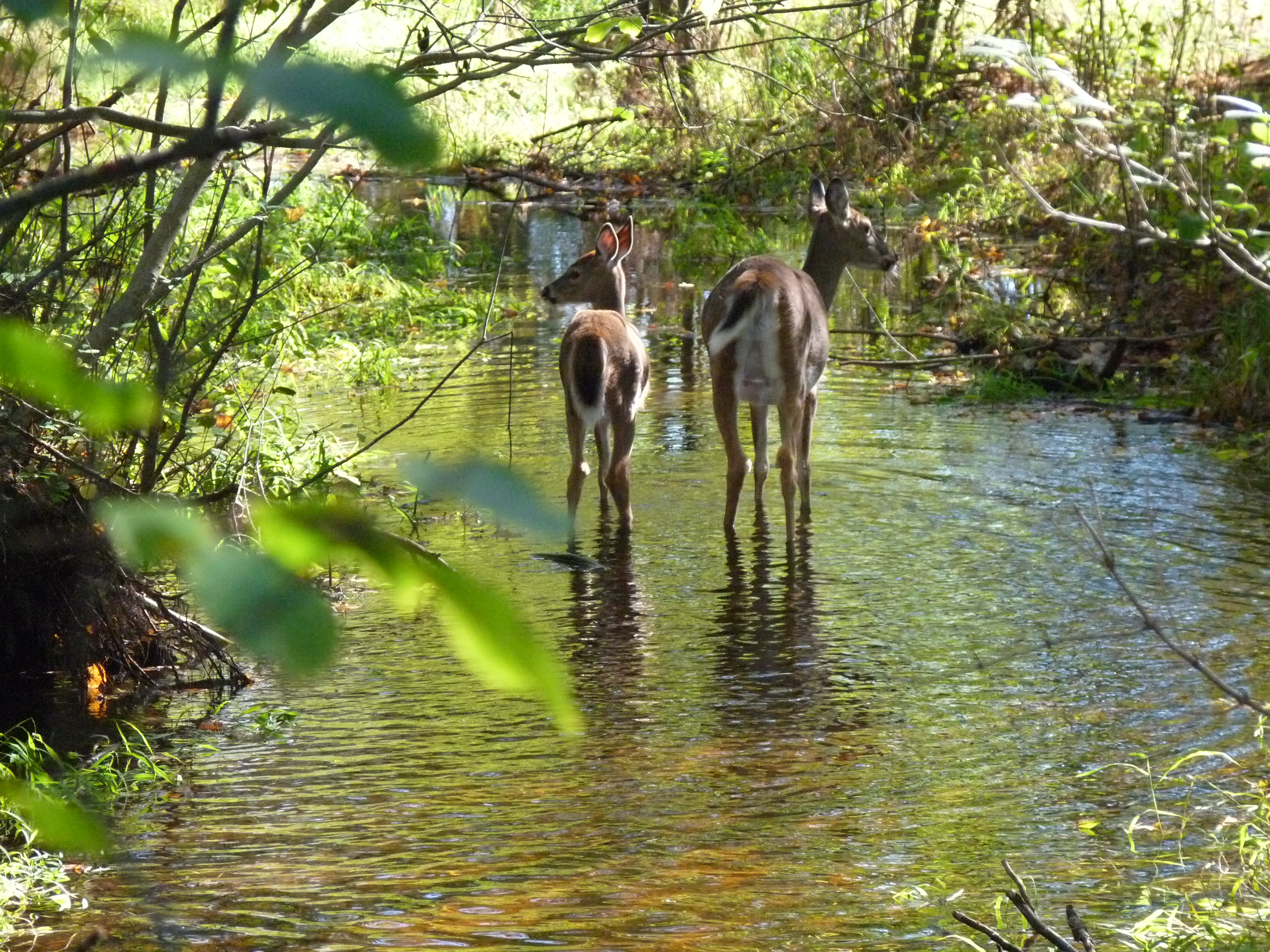
- Two white-tailed deer in a stream at the reserve
- Interactive map of Schmeeckle Reserve
- Location: 2419 North Point Drive; Stevens Point, Wisconsin
- Coordinates: 44.540878°N 89.564935°W
- Area: Over 280 acres (110 ha)
- Created: 1976
- Operator: University of Wisconsin–Stevens Point
- Hiking trails: 5 miles (8.0 km)
- Website: Official website

Schmeeckle Reserve is a 280-acre (1.1 km^{2}) natural land area located on the University of Wisconsin–Stevens Point, in Stevens Point, Wisconsin, United States. It contains hiking trails, natural land area, a visitor center, multiple habitats, abundant wildlife and a manmade lake. "The Reserve was created to protect and restore native ecological communities, serve as an outdoor classroom for students and teachers, and provide recreational opportunities to all visitors."

== History ==
Before 1956 the current Schmeeckle Reserve was farmland (corn and grain) and grazing (dairy cattle) land. This land, however was not fertile enough to support a large plant population for agriculture due to bedrock close to the surface, making some areas too wet or dry to support crops. By the 1950s several farmers had abandoned their efforts to make the ground agriculturally productive (abandoned machinery and building foundations are still visible onsite).

The University began purchasing this land, which is located north and east of campus, in 1956, and initially used it as a picnic area. Students from the University's Conservation Department were called out to fight fires many times, and their furrows which they dug to help stop the fires can still be seen weaving through the reserve. By 1969 the University owned a total of 127 acres (0.51 km^{2}) of land, and there was debate on whether to use it for residence halls, housing for married students, athletic fields, or other options. In 1974 the University proposed to use this land for a natural area and hiking trails, with an arboretum. At that time the area presently covered by Lake Joanis was not part of the University's holdings.

== Creation of Lake Joanis ==
At about the same time that the University was proposing its natural area plan, Sentry Insurance, a nationwide company headquartered in Stevens Point, proposed building a new office building on the next major street north of the University campus. The company's environmental impact statement found that the building would significantly increase vehicle traffic on Reserve Street, which ran through the campus at that time. To reduce the danger that this increase would pose to the University's students, the company proposed closing that street and extending Michigan Avenue through the proposed natural area to replace Reserve Street. At first this proposal brought heated resistance, since it would split the natural area, so a compromise was reached: the construction would require significant soil, which was to be excavated from a 50-acre tract east of the University's acreage. The company would leave that excavation open (it would eventually fill with groundwater, creating an artificial lake), and would deed the tract to the University to be added to the proposed nature holdings.

The University agreed with this proposal, and public opposition was calmed. The road extension was completed in 1975. The resulting lake, which covered 24 of the site's 50 acres, was officially named Lake Joanis in 1994, after Sentry Insurance President John Joanis, who paid for its excavation.

== Creation ==
Schmeeckle Reserve was established in 1976 with a $250,000 Land and Water Conservation (LAWCON) Grant. The 50 acres (200,000 m^{2}) with Lake Joanis was included within the reserve at this time. The Reserve's first Director was Ron Zimmerman (1977). One of his first acts was to work for the purchase of an adjacent (20 acres) farm, that was once owned by the Edward Wojcik family. The Wojcik's ranch home was converted into the Visitor Center by students from the University over a three-year period, finishing by 1979. By 1981 the LAWCON funds had paid for over five miles of trails and boardwalks, fitness trails and the shelter building.

== Expansion ==
Over the years, Schmeeckle Reserve has continued to expand its facilities and resources. When the Wisconsin Conservation Hall of Fame was created in 1984, Schmeeckle Reserve became its new home. In 1990, the Hall of Fame constructed a new addition to the Visitor Center with funding from the city's Motel Room tax and more LAWCON funding. Included in the addition was a walk-through exhibit area, formal Hall of Fame gallery, meeting room and sign-making workshop.

With the 1998 acquisition of the 75-acre Berard Oaks area at the northeast corner of the Reserve, Schmeeckle has grown to 280 acres. The Reserve continues to evolve, as new trails are developed, further land acquisitions are sought, and prairie and oak savannah habitats are restored.

== Fred Schmeeckle ==
Fred Schmeeckle, the namesake of the reserve, was a professor from Nebraska who taught at the Stevens Point Normal School beginning in 1923. He taught agriculture but was also a supporter of conservation education, "the destruction of forests, pollution of water, and misuse of wildlife areas are factors that started me thinking something should be done to educate people in the wise use of resources." In the early 1930s Schmeeckle began teaching conservation courses. This program is now the largest undergraduate natural resources program of its kind in the nation. Schmeeckle took his classes on walks and on bird watching trips to the natural area north of the campus, which is now where the reserve is located. In 1954 Schmeeckle said, "Some day this area will serve as an island of green in the city of Stevens Point." He had it right and his island of green is now named for him.

== Plant and animal life ==
The habitats within the Reserve are many and varied. Cattails, pine, oak and deciduous forests are found. Wildlife common to the reserve 'but not limited to' include frogs, deer, rabbits, squirrels, turtles, snakes, geese and ducks.

== See also ==
- List of botanical gardens and arboretums in Wisconsin
