= Wyoming Village Historic District (Wyoming, New York) =

Historic district in New York, United States

- U.S. National Register of Historic Places
- U.S. Historic district
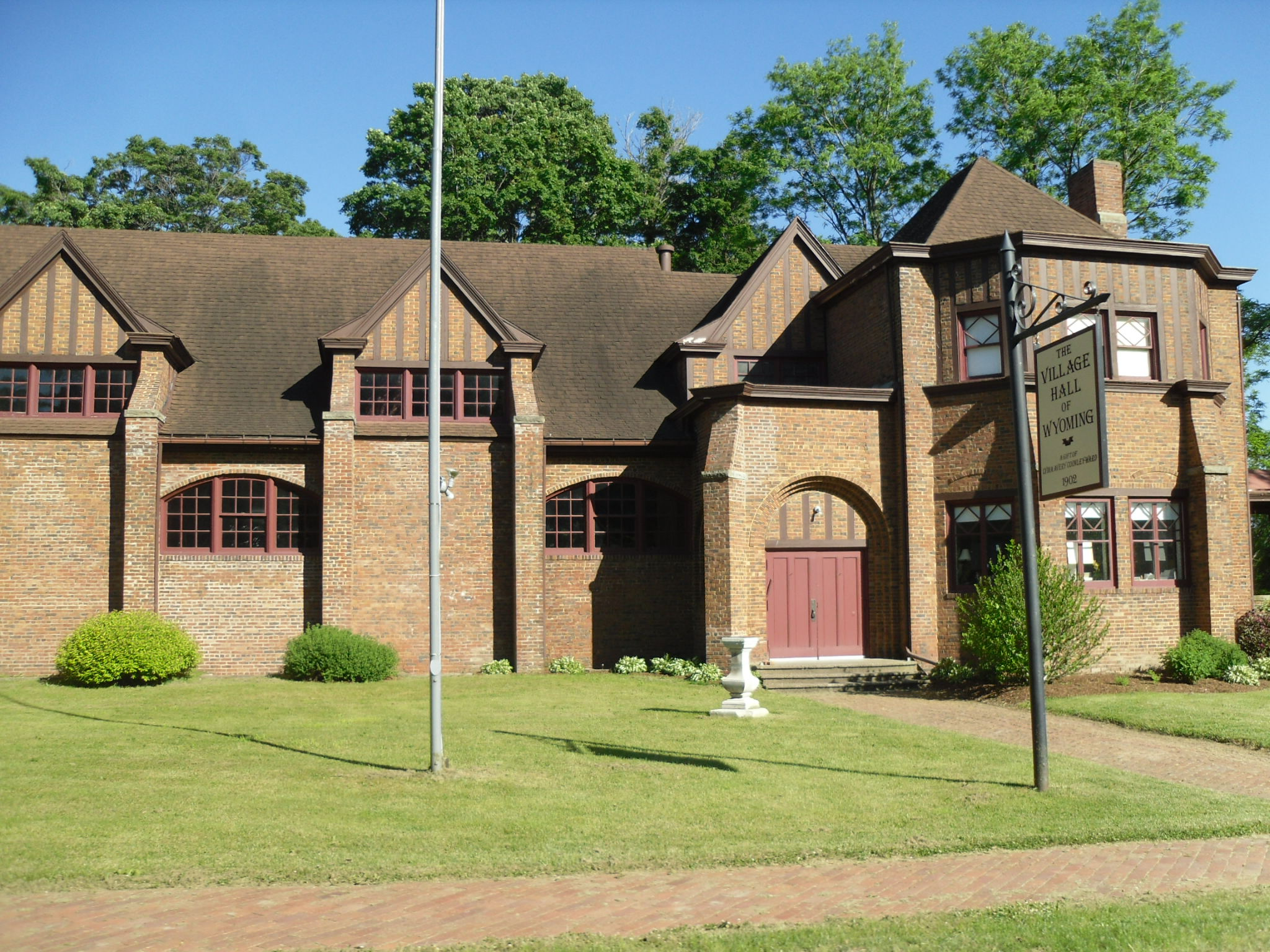
- Wyoming Village Hall, May 2010

- Location within New York Location within the United States
- Location: NY 19, Wyoming, New York
- Coordinates: 42°49′37″N 78°5′15″W
- Area: 45 acres (18 ha)
- Architectural style: Greek Revival, Federal
- NRHP reference No.: 74001326
- Added to NRHP: December 27, 1974

Wyoming Village Historic District is a national historic district located at the Village of Wyoming in Wyoming County, New York. The district covers about 45 acres (180,000 m^{2}) and is organized as a New England village around a small triangular village green. The T-shaped district includes approximately 72 historic registered structures along two principal streets, Main and Academy Streets.

According to the National Register of Historic Places, classes of historic significance include Architecture, Education, Social/Humanitarian and Town Planning. Of interest in architectural classification are: Greek Revival, Victorian, Colonial Revival, Gothic, and French Provincial. The district's NRHP Reference Number is 74001326.

The majority of the houses in the historic district date from the second quarter of the 19th century and were mostly built by small tradesman, merchants and retired farmers. The two rows of century-old maples that line Maple Street stand among the simple frame houses.

The district's dominant structures are the Presbyterian Church (1830), Fire Tower (1902), Wyoming Inn (1838), Bryant Fleming House (1910) and Village Hall (1902). The historic Middlebury Academy has been listed separately on the National Register of Historic Places since 1974.

== District plan ==
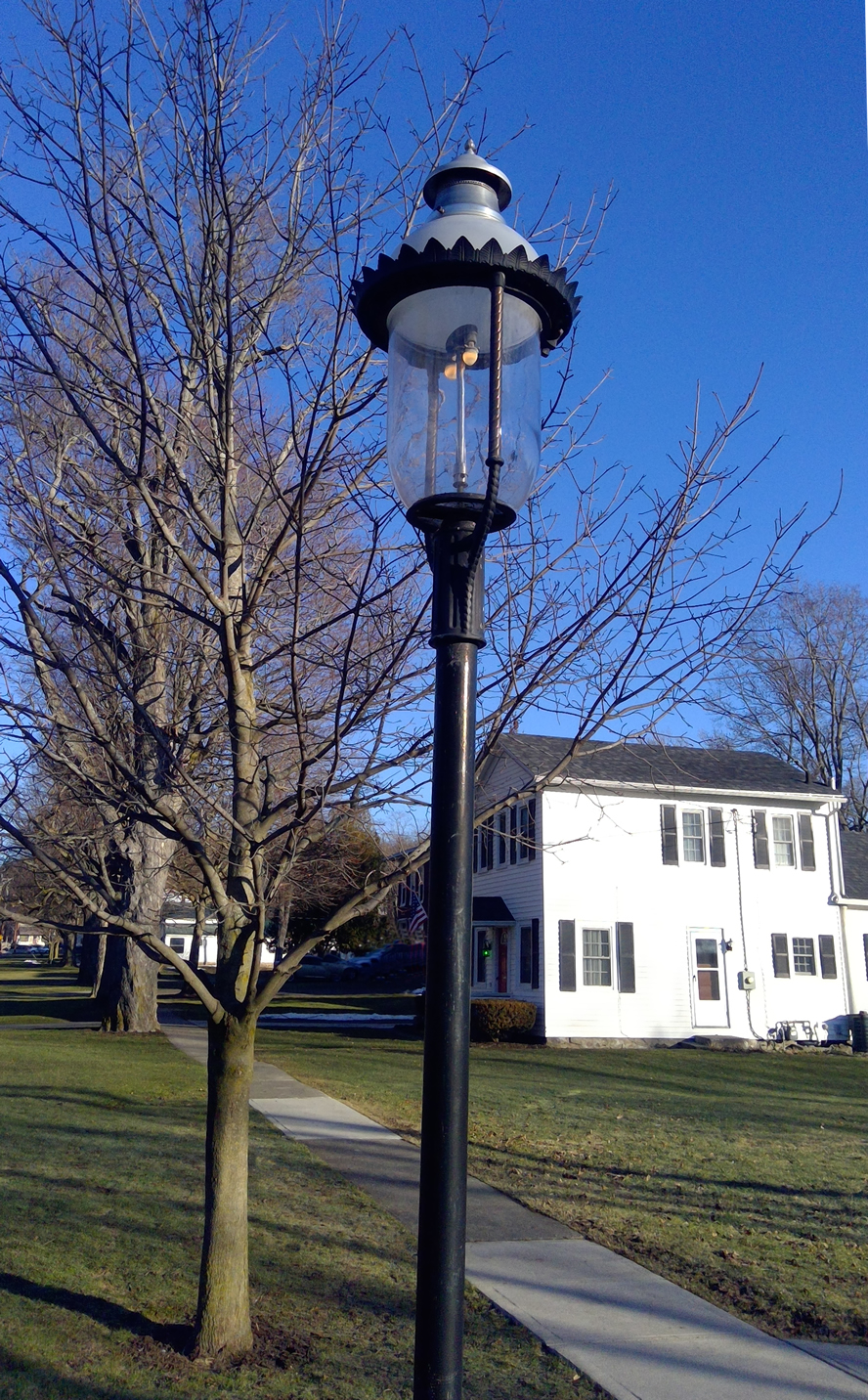
Historic gaslight in the Village of Wyoming, New York.

Wyoming Village Historic District is organized much like a New England village around a small triangular green. The T-shaped district includes approximately seventy structures along the two principal village thoroughfares: Main and Academy Streets.

The district boundaries are drawn to include the heart of the community where the 1838 Wyoming Inn (#1 S. Academy Street), the turn-of-the century bank (#5 S. Academy) a series of stores, the village "Fire Tower" (#10 Tower Road) and the Presbyterian Church (#1 N. Academy St.) are clustered around the triangular green.

The village nickname is "The Gaslight Village" because it is lit day and night by 30 gas lamps which use natural gas drawn from nearby shallow gas pockets under a 99-year lease.

== Architectural influences ==
=== Federal style ===
Houses in the district show Federal influence and are generally two-story frame buildings with center doorway, five bays wide on the front facade and usually one bay wide on the sides. The notable examples of this style are:

- The Newell-Bradley-Bishop House at #73 Main Street,
- the Dillon House at #14 S. Academy Street,
- the Cushing-Hooker House at #30 S. Academy Street, and
- the Chad Ewell-Squires House at #31 Main Street.

The most dominant building on the village green is the Presbyterian Church. This steepled, white church is a western New York State adaptation of the New England Church-on-the-Green. A large frame building, it was completed in 1830 and has some Federal features (simple front door and fanlight) as well as some later influences (the narrow paired windows lighting the nave). The interior was remodeled in 1852 and the spire rebuilt in 1870.

=== Greek Revival style ===
The 1817 Middlebury Academy (listed separately on the National Register) is known for its monumental Greek Revival portico which was probably added several years later. Some federal style exists in other elements.

Two other buildings in the district have prominent Greek Revival characteristics:

- The Ferris-Arnold House (#6 N. Academy Street), a 1 1/2-story frame building on an unusually high basement, flush board siding with quoined treatment in wood delineating the three front bays, front entrance with side lights and transom, high front porch with paired fluted columns, balustrade along roofline. On the interior, wallpaper depicts scenes from Sir Walter Scott novels. Formal gardens still evident on south side of house.
- The Dodson-Swanson House (#36 Main Street), a large two-story house with centered four-bay-wide Doric portico, flanking wings with pitches also supported by fluted Doric columns. Side wings were probably enlarged to present two-story heights later in 19th century, or early 20th century.

== Significant or unusual structures ==
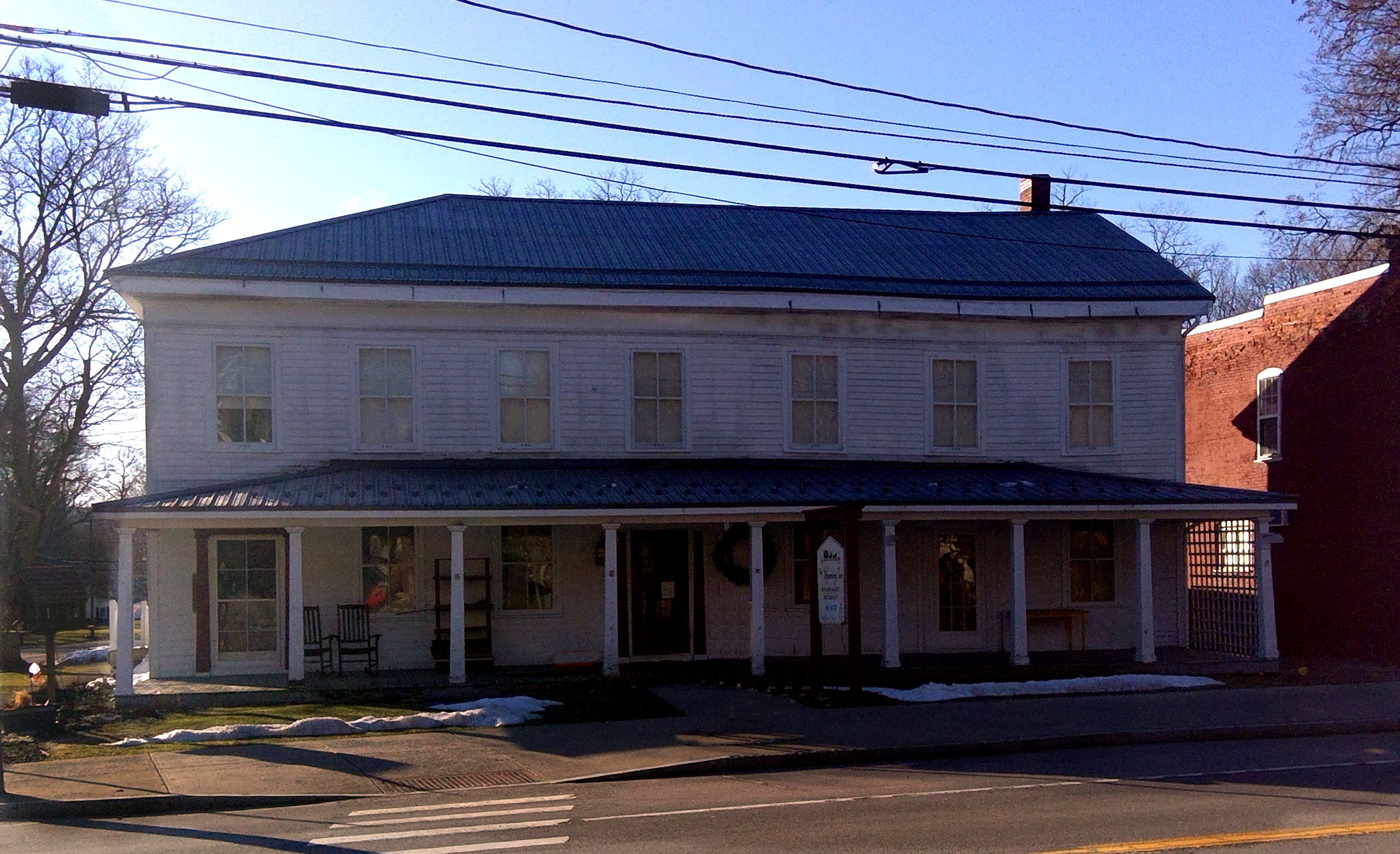
The Wyoming Inn built in 1838 is located at #1 S. Academy Street. It is still operating as a bed and breakfast hotel and community restaurant.

Some of the unusual structures dating from its mid-19th century period of growth in the village of Wyoming include:

- Seaver-Trumpfheller House (#14 N. Academy St.) is a 2 1/2-story asymmetrical frame house with Victorian barge boards and other elaborate carving around windows and entrance porch.
- #46 Main Street was built as the first district schoolhouse in Wyoming, operated since 1916 as a farm supply and hardware store by a family named Handyside. It has a simple one-story structure with narrow clapboards, three bays wide, simple doorway, gable roof with considerable overhang, and louvered cupola.
- Ianella-Dutton House (#32 Main Street) – two-story frame house with elegant woodwork on porches and in gables similar to #14 N. Academy.

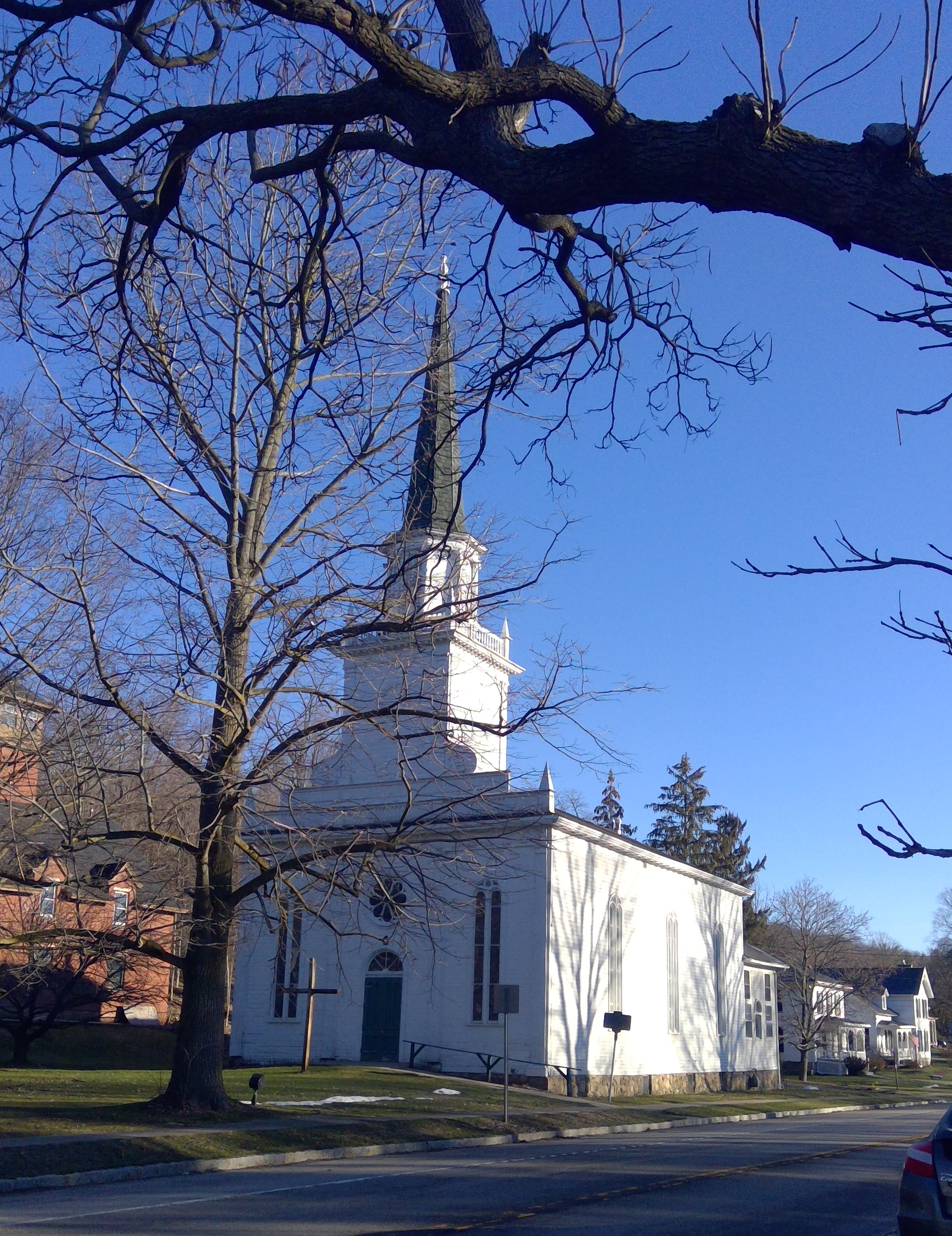
Wyoming Presbyterian Church at #1 N. Academy Street within the Wyoming Village Historic District

- Warren-Main House (#31 S. Academy) – 1 1/2-story board-and-batten cottage with gothic trim at the gables. Early twentieth-century colonial revival porch added by architect Bryant Fleming
- The Main Street churches both burned late in the 19th century. The Baptists replaced their church at #28 Main Street with a substantial brick building about 1876. The Methodist Church at #16 Main Street was built in 1893 and is a frame building with Gothic detailing, finials, and pointed windows.
- Fire Tower on Tower Road is a 1 1/2-story brick building with a steeply pitched pagoda-like roof. It was built in 1902 as the village fire station and as a companion structure to the Village Hall. Both were a gift to the community from the Lydia Avery Coonley-Ward family who lived just outside the village at the historic Hillside estate. The tower was renovated with a German clock in the 1990s.
- Village Hall on Academy Street is a brick building of French Provincial architecture. It was built in 1902 along with the Fire Tower as a gift to the village from the Lydia Avery Coonley-Ward family who intended it to be a community center for the fine arts and sciences. On the first floor is a lobby, clubroom, kitchen, and an assembly room. The assembly room is a 2-story space of about 60x40 feet, with ceiling buttresses running up to high dormer windows and rather sharply sloping roofs. Room fixtures include built-in bench seating, fireplace, and a performance stage. The stage's proscenium arch is flanked by elaborate black teak timbers once part of the King of Siam's exhibit at the 1893 World's Columbian Exposition in Chicago. On the mezzanine is a musician's gallery and cloakroom. On the second floor is a small museum containing an original 1902–1906 natural history cabinet collection by Mr. Henry A. Ward. A basement contains additional assembly space, toilet facilities, and storage. Village Hall grounds include about 3 acres with mature trees, a carriage house (private residence) and a segment of Gulf Creek.
- Middlebury Academy on Academy Street was a college preparatory school for boys. Bryant Fleming's architecture office was in the Academy during his construction of the Hillside estate for Lydia Avery Coonley.

== Locations of district structures ==
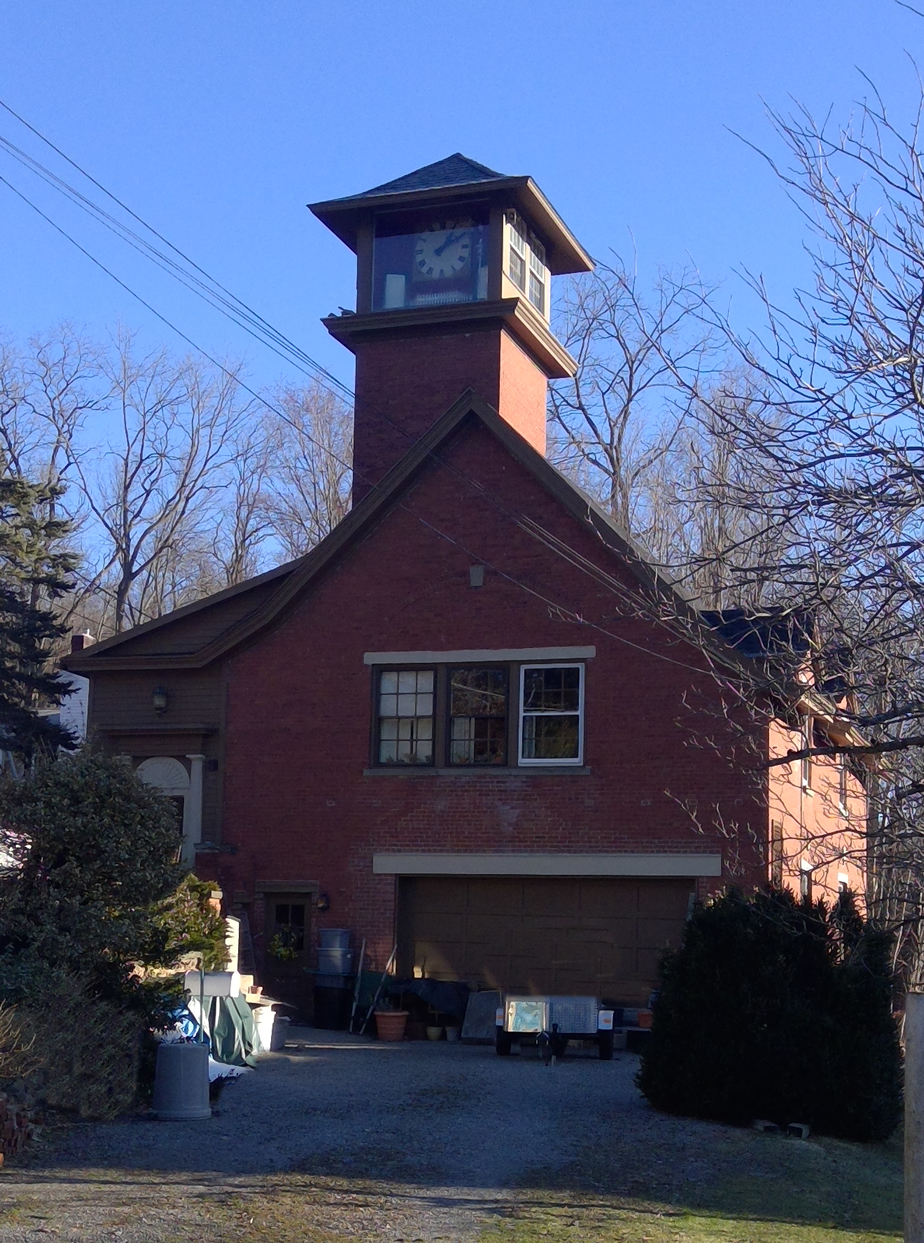
The Fire Tower (1902) in the Wyoming Village Historic District.

Within the Wyoming Village Historic District:

South Academy Street

- East side – #4, 8, 14, 18, 22 (Middlebury Academy), 28, 30, 32, 42, 46.
- West side – #1 (Wyoming Inn), 5, 15 (Village Hall), 25, 31, 33, 37.

North Academy Street

- #1 (Presbyterian Church), 2, 6, 14.

Main Street

- North side – #3, 7, 11, 15, 21, 25, 31, 35(?), 37, 45, 47, 49, 51, 57, 59, 63, 65, 69, 73, 79, 83.
- South side – #6, 8, 16 (Methodist Church), 20, 22, 26, 28 (1st Baptist Church), 30, 32, 36, 40, 42, 46, 50, 52, 54, 56, 58, 60, 64, 66.

Tower Road

- #3, 10 (Fire Tower).

Gulf Road

- #2, 7, 11, 18.
