= Middlebury Academy (Wyoming, New York) =

- U.S. National Register of Historic Places
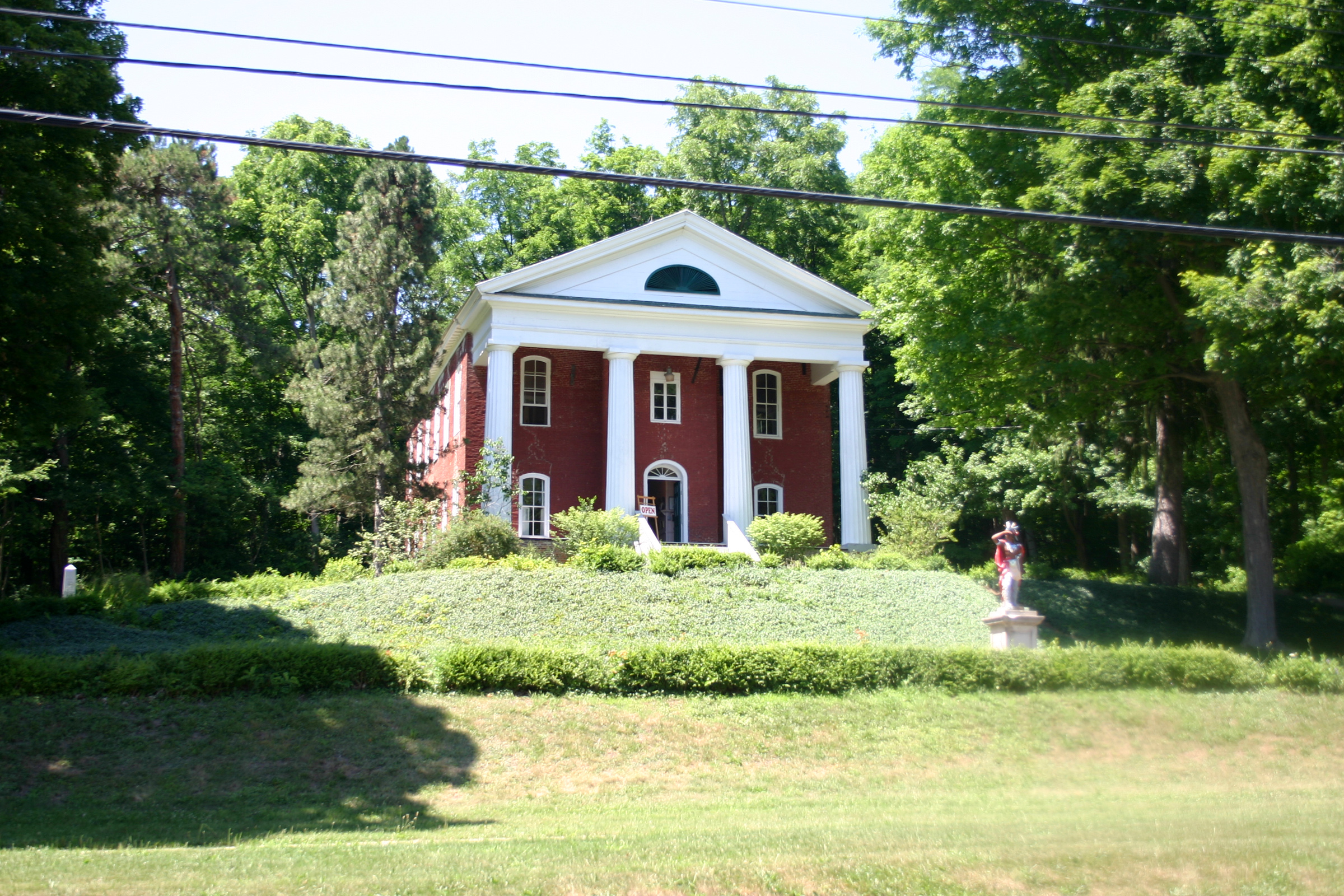
- Middlebury Academy, July 2005

- Location within New York Location within the United States
- Location: 22 S. Academy St., Wyoming, New York
- Coordinates: 42°49′39″N 78°5′23″W
- Built: 1817
- Architectural style: Greek Revival
- NRHP reference No.: 73001293
- Added to NRHP: January 17, 1973

Middlebury Academy is a historic school in Wyoming, Wyoming County, New York. The Greek Revival style structure was erected by the citizens of Wyoming in 1817. Originally sponsored by the local Baptist church, the academy became a Wyoming County Union Free School in 1880 and operated as a school until 1912. It is now home to the Middlebury Historical Society. It is located within the boundaries of the Wyoming Village Historic District.

It was listed on the National Register of Historic Places in 1973.

== Notable alumni ==
- John C. Burroughs (1818-1892), educator
- Milton J. Daniels (1838-1914), Civil War veteran and politician
- James Rood Doolittle (1815-1897), politician
- Seth M. Gates (1800-1877), merchant, attorney and politician
- Milo H. Olin (1842-1907), businessman and politician
- James O. Putnam (1818-1903), lawyer and politician
- Amelia Kempshall Wing (1837-1927), author and philanthropist
