= Wyoming, New York =

- Village
- Nickname: Gaslight Village
- Location within the state of New York
- Coordinates: 42°49′31″N 78°5′7″W
- Country: United States
- State: New York
- County: Wyoming
- Settled: 1809
- Incorporated: July 31, 1875
- Named for: Lenape word meaning "broad bottom lands"

Government
  - Mayor: Nathan Norton
  - Town Council: Village Board (5 members)

Area
  - Total: 0.69 sq mi (1.80 km^{2})
  - Land: 0.69 sq mi (1.80 km^{2})
  - Water: 0 sq mi (0.00 km^{2})
- Elevation: 988 ft (301 m)

Population (2020)
  - Total: 377
  - Density: 541.1/sq mi (208.91/km^{2})
- Time zone: UTC-5 (Eastern (EST))
  - Summer (DST): UTC-4 (EDT)
- ZIP code: 14591
- Area code: 585
- FIPS code: 36-83371
- GNIS feature ID: 0971788
- Website: villageofwyoming.org

Wyoming is a village in Wyoming County, New York, United States. As of the 2020 census, Wyoming had a population of 377.

The Village of Wyoming lies within the Town of Middlebury by the eastern town line. Wyoming is located on New York State Route 19.

== History ==
The Village of Newell's Settlement was founded in 1809 by Silas Newell. It was later renamed to Wyoming in 1829, to be incorporated in 1875. However, on Revolutionary War muster roll taken for March, April, May, and June 1779, of Lieutenant Colonel William Smith's company, a regiment of foot it states the regiment was mustered in Wyoming. Signed and dated by Nehemiah Wade, D.C.M. on June 30, 1779. It was one of the earliest locations where natural gas was developed. While the field was never a large producer, it still provides gas for the village streetlights and some homes to this day. The downtown historic district is known as the "Gaslight Village."

Middlebury Academy was built in 1817 and was chartered by the NY Regents in 1819, and is believed to be the first institution of higher education west of the Genesee in New York. It still stands in downtown Wyoming, maintained as a museum by the Middlebury Historical Society. It is listed on the National Register of Historic Places as of 1980. Also on the National Register of Historic Places are the Bryant Fleming House and Wyoming Village Historic District.

Another historic place is Hillside Inn, a classic Greek revival mansion built by Dr. Pliny Hayes as a Water Cure establishment in 1851. It overlooks the Village of Wyoming, and until 2012, was a bed and breakfast inn. It also has been a spa (with mineral springs) and has hosted many famous people including Susan B. Anthony, John Muir, and Presidents Theodore and Franklin D. Roosevelt.

== Geography ==
Wyoming is located at 42°49′31″N 78°5′7″W (42.825204, -78.085227).

Oatka Creek flows northward past the east side of the village.

According to the United States Census Bureau, the village has a total area of 0.7 square miles (1.8 km^{2}), all land.

=== Climate ===
Climate data for Wyoming, New York (1991–2020)
Month	Jan	Feb	Mar	Apr	May	Jun	Jul	Aug	Sep	Oct	Nov	Dec	Year
Mean daily maximum °F (°C)	30.0 (−1.1)	31.3 (−0.4)	38.4 (3.6)	53.2 (11.8)	65.3 (18.5)	73.1 (22.8)	76.5 (24.7)	75.2 (24.0)	68.1 (20.1)	56.6 (13.7)	45.2 (7.3)	34.9 (1.6)	54.0 (12.2)
Daily mean °F (°C)	22.6 (−5.2)	23.0 (−5.0)	30.4 (−0.9)	42.8 (6.0)	55.3 (12.9)	64.3 (17.9)	67.8 (19.9)	66.4 (19.1)	59.6 (15.3)	48.4 (9.1)	37.7 (3.2)	28.2 (−2.1)	45.5 (7.5)
Mean daily minimum °F (°C)	15.2 (−9.3)	14.6 (−9.7)	22.4 (−5.3)	32.3 (0.2)	45.2 (7.3)	55.5 (13.1)	59.1 (15.1)	57.6 (14.2)	51.0 (10.6)	40.2 (4.6)	30.1 (−1.1)	21.4 (−5.9)	37.1 (2.8)
Average precipitation inches (mm)	3.53 (90)	2.72 (69)	3.09 (78)	3.39 (86)	3.35 (85)	4.00 (102)	4.76 (121)	3.60 (91)	3.40 (86)	3.75 (95)	3.38 (86)	2.81 (71)	41.78 (1,060)
Source: NOAA

== Demographics ==
Historical population
Census	Pop.	Note	%±
1870	338		—
1880	387		14.5%
1890	525		35.7%
1920	386		—
1930	376		−2.6%
1940	430		14.4%
1950	508		18.1%
1960	526		3.5%
1970	514		−2.3%
1980	507		−1.4%
1990	478		−5.7%
2000	513		7.3%
2010	434		−15.4%
2020	377		−13.1%
U.S. Decennial Census

As of the census of 2000, there were 513 people, 176 households, and 133 families residing in the village. The population density was 763.2 inhabitants per square mile (294.7/km^{2}). There were 179 housing units at an average density of 266.3 units per square mile (102.8 units/km^{2}). The racial makeup of the village was 96.88% White, 0.39% African American, 0.58% Native American, 0.97% from other races, and 1.17% from two or more races. Hispanic or Latino of any race were 0.39% of the population.

There were 176 households, out of which 44.9% had children under the age of 18 living with them, 60.2% were married couples living together, 10.2% had a female householder with no husband present, and 24.4% were non-families. 17.6% of all households were made up of individuals, and 10.8% had someone living alone who was 65 years of age or older. The average household size was 2.90 and the average family size was 3.33.

In the village, the population was spread out, with 32.6% under the age of 18, 6.4% from 18 to 24, 30.2% from 25 to 44, 20.1% from 45 to 64, and 10.7% who were 65 years of age or older. The median age was 33 years. For every 100 females, there were 94.3 males. For every 100 females age 18 and over, there were 92.2 males.

The median income for a household in the village was $38,750, and the median income for a family was $46,875. Males had a median income of $34,643 versus $25,357 for females. The per capita income for the village was $14,925. About 6.4% of families and 6.0% of the population were below the poverty line, including 3.6% of those under age 18 and none of those age 65 or over.
