= National Register of Historic Places listings in Wyoming County, New York =

Location of Wyoming County in New York

List of the National Register of Historic Places listings in Wyoming County, New York

This is intended to be a complete list of properties and districts listed on the National Register of Historic Places in Wyoming County, New York. The locations of National Register properties and districts (at least for all showing latitude and longitude coordinates below) may be seen in a map by clicking on "Map of all coordinates".

This National Park Service list is complete through NPS recent listings posted September 11, 2026.

Contents: Counties in New York
Albany (Albany) – Allegany – Bronx – Broome – Cattaraugus – Cayuga – Chautauqua – Chemung – Chenango – Clinton – Columbia – Cortland – Delaware – Dutchess (Poughkeepsie, Rhinebeck) – Erie (Buffalo) – Essex – Franklin – Fulton – Genesee – Greene – Hamilton – Herkimer – Jefferson – Kings – Lewis – Livingston – Madison – Monroe (Rochester) – Montgomery – Nassau – New York (Below 14th Street, 14th to 59th Streets, 59th to 110th Streets, Above 110th Street, Islands) – Niagara (Niagara Falls) – Oneida – Onondaga (Syracuse) – Ontario – Orange – Orleans – Oswego – Otsego – Putnam – Queens – Rensselaer – Richmond – Rockland – St. Lawrence – Saratoga – Schenectady – Schoharie – Schuyler – Seneca – Steuben – Suffolk – Sullivan – Tioga – Tompkins – Ulster – Warren – Washington – Wayne – Westchester (Northern, Southern, New Rochelle, Peekskill, Yonkers) – Wyoming – Yates

== Listings county-wide ==
	Name on the Register	Image	Date listed	Location	City or town	Description
1	Arcade and Attica Railroad	Arcade and Attica Railroad	November 17, 1980 (#80002797)	Railroad right of way from Arcade to N. Java; 42°34′24″N 78°25′22″W	North Java	
2	Arcade Center Farm		April 15, 2004 (#04000290)	7298 NY 98; 42°32′38″N 78°24′12″W	Arcade	
3	Arcade Downtown Historic District		May 11, 2026 (#100012991)	229-297 Main Street: 315 West Main Street. 6-12. 15 Liberty Street: 17 Church Street; 42°32′02″N 78°25′25″W	Arcade	
4	Attica Market and Main Historic District	Attica Market and Main Historic District	May 1, 2013 (#13000225)	2-28 & 19-45 Market St., 2-10 & 21-39 Main St. 42°51′55″N 78°17′05″W	Attica	
5	Brick Presbyterian Church	Brick Presbyterian Church	October 3, 2007 (#07001042)	6 Church St. 42°43′15″N 78°00′05″W	Perry	
6	Epworth Hall	Epworth Hall	April 6, 2000 (#00000350)	Perry Ave. 42°41′53″N 78°01′16″W	Perry	
7	Exchange Street Historic District	Exchange Street Historic District	November 21, 2012 (#12000962)	15-48 Exchange St. & Erie RR Depot; 42°51′48″N 78°16′50″W	Attica	
8	First Free Will Baptist Church of Pike	First Free Will Baptist Church of Pike	June 27, 2012 (#12000369)	72 Main St. 42°33′17″N 78°09′21″W	Pike	
9	First Methodist Episcopal Church of Perry	First Methodist Episcopal Church of Perry	September 28, 2006 (#06000880)	35 Covington St. 42°43′10″N 78°00′18″W	Perry	
10	First Universalist Church of Portageville	First Universalist Church of Portageville	February 19, 2008 (#08000040)	E. Koy Rd. at NY 19A; 42°34′04″N 78°02′43″W	Portageville	
11	Bryant Fleming House	Bryant Fleming House	October 14, 2009 (#09000838)	1024 Tower Road; 42°49′52″N 78°05′31″W	Wyoming	
12	Seth M. Gates House	Seth M. Gates House	February 21, 1992 (#92000031)	15 Perry Ave. 42°44′26″N 78°08′06″W	Warsaw	
13	Java School No. 1		June 21, 2001 (#01000672)	NY 78; 42°40′26″N 78°26′11″W	Java Village	
14	Letchworth State Park	Letchworth State Park	November 4, 2005 (#03000718)	Genesee River Gorge Bet. Portageville and Mt. Morris; 42°38′05″N 77°59′00″W	Castile	
15	Middlebury Academy	Middlebury Academy	January 17, 1973 (#73001293)	22 S. Academy St. 42°49′39″N 78°05′23″W	Wyoming	
16	Monument Circle Historic District	Monument Circle Historic District	May 11, 1992 (#92000447)	Roughly, E. Court St. from N. Main St. to Park St. and adjacent parts of Main and Park; 42°44′35″N 78°07′53″W	Warsaw	
17	Perry Downtown Historic District	Perry Downtown Historic District	April 16, 2012 (#12000212)	N. & S. Main, Covington, & Lake Sts., Borden Ave. 42°43′06″N 78°00′07″W	Perry	
18	Perry High School		August 3, 2026 (#100013292)	59 Leicester Street; 42°43′16″N 78°00′05″W	Perry	
19	Perry Village Hall		October 28, 2022 (#100008318)	46 North Main St. 42°43′10″N 78°00′03″W	Perry	
20	Barna C. Roup House		August 10, 2015 (#15000519)	38 Borden Ave. 42°43′02″N 78°00′12″W	Perry	1898 Queen Anne house built by notable local attorney during period of village's major growth
21	Silver Lake Institute Historic District	Silver Lake Institute Historic District	September 19, 1985 (#85002442)	Roughly bounded by Wesley, Embury, Thompson, Haven, Lakeside & Lakeview Aves. 42°41′56″N 78°01′20″W	Silver Lake Institute	
22	Augustus A. Smith House	Augustus A. Smith House	June 27, 2007 (#07000627)	125 Main St. 42°51′44″N 78°16′42″W	Attica	
23	Trinity Church	Trinity Church	March 18, 1980 (#80002798)	W. Buffalo St. 42°44′23″N 78°08′03″W	Warsaw	
24	US Post Office-Attica	US Post Office-Attica	November 17, 1988 (#88002453)	76 Main St. 42°51′49″N 78°16′51″W	Attica	
25	US Post Office-Warsaw	US Post Office-Warsaw	May 11, 1989 (#88002441)	35 S. Main St. 42°44′22″N 78°07′59″W	Warsaw	
26	Warsaw Academy	Warsaw Academy	January 3, 1980 (#80002799)	73 S. Main St. 42°44′19″N 78°07′58″W	Warsaw	
27	Warsaw Downtown Historic District	Warsaw Downtown Historic District	November 21, 2012 (#12000963)	N. & S. Main between Frank & Brooklyn Sts. 42°44′22″N 78°07′57″W	Warsaw	
28	Orator F. Woodward Cottage		August 22, 2016 (#16000559)	3931 Thompson Ave. 42°41′55″N 78°01′11″W	Silver Lake	1894 vacation home of Jell-O inventor and popularizer, later used as a guest house for Methodist preachers visiting the Silver Lake Institute
29	Wyoming Village Historic District	Wyoming Village Historic District	December 27, 1974 (#74001326)	NY 19; 42°49′37″N 78°05′15″W	Wyoming	

== See also ==
- National Register of Historic Places listings in New York
