= Castile, New York =

Castile
- Town
- Location within Wyoming County and New York

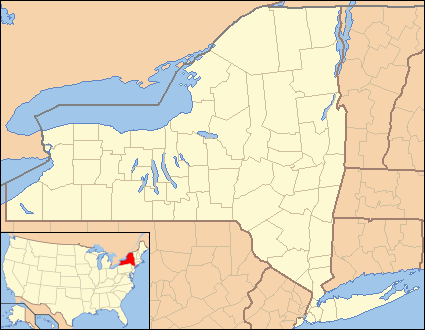
- Location of Castile in New York
- Coordinates: 42°37′44″N 78°03′17″W
- Country: United States
- State: New York
- County: Wyoming

Area
  - Total: 38.39 sq mi (99.44 km^{2})
  - Land: 36.98 sq mi (95.78 km^{2})
  - Water: 1.42 sq mi (3.67 km^{2})

Population (2010)
  - Total: 2,906
  - Estimate (2016): 2,816
  - Density: 76/sq mi (29.4/km^{2})
- Time zone: UTC-5 (Eastern (EST))
  - Summer (DST): UTC-4 (EDT)
- FIPS code: 36-121-12782
- Website: Town of Castile

Castile is an incorporated town in Wyoming County, New York, United States. The population was 2,873 at the 2000 census. The town is named after the historical region of Castile in Spain. The Town of Castile is on the eastern border of the county. The town contains a village which is also named Castile.

== History ==
The Town of Castile was established in 1821 from part of the Town of Perry.

== Geography ==
According to the United States Census Bureau, the town has a total area of 38.4 square miles (99.6 km^{2}), of which 37.0 square miles (95.9 km^{2}) is land and 1.4 square miles (3.7 km^{2}) (3.75%) is water.

Part of the eastern town boundary is the border of Livingston County, New York.

== Demographics ==
Historical population
Census	Pop.	Note	%±
1830	2,259		—
1840	2,833		25.4%
1850	2,446		−13.7%
1860	2,323		−5.0%
1870	2,186		−5.9%
1880	2,315		5.9%
1890	2,451		5.9%
1900	2,539		3.6%
1910	2,406		−5.2%
1920	2,290		−4.8%
1930	1,996		−12.8%
1940	2,172		8.8%
1950	2,361		8.7%
1960	2,609		10.5%
1970	3,156		21.0%
1980	2,865		−9.2%
1990	3,042		6.2%
2000	2,873		−5.6%
2010	2,906		1.1%
2016 (est.)	2,816	▼	−3.1%
U.S. Decennial Census

As of the census of 2000, there were 2,873 people, 1,128 households, and 788 families residing in the town. The population density was 77.6 inhabitants per square mile (30.0/km^{2}). There were 1,679 housing units at an average density of 45.4 per square mile (17.5/km^{2}). The racial makeup of the town was 98.43% White, 0.45% Black or African American, 0.21% Native American, 0.31% Asian, 0.10% from other races, and 0.49% from two or more races. Hispanic or Latino of any race were 0.52% of the population.

There were 1,128 households, out of which 32.0% had children under the age of 18 living with them, 56.2% were married couples living together, 8.6% had a female householder with no husband present, and 30.1% were non-families. 25.3% of all households were made up of individuals, and 12.5% had someone living alone who was 65 years of age or older. The average household size was 2.49 and the average family size was 2.97.

In the town, the population was spread out, with 24.5% under the age of 18, 8.0% from 18 to 24, 27.3% from 25 to 44, 24.7% from 45 to 64, and 15.4% who were 65 years of age or older. The median age was 39 years. For every 100 females, there were 99.1 males. For every 100 females age 18 and over, there were 95.8 males.

The median income for a household in the town was $35,762, and the median income for a family was $40,991. Males had a median income of $30,529 versus $21,500 for females. The per capita income for the town was $17,448. About 7.6% of families and 10.7% of the population were below the poverty line, including 13.4% of those under age 18 and 4.3% of those age 65 or over.

== Notable people ==
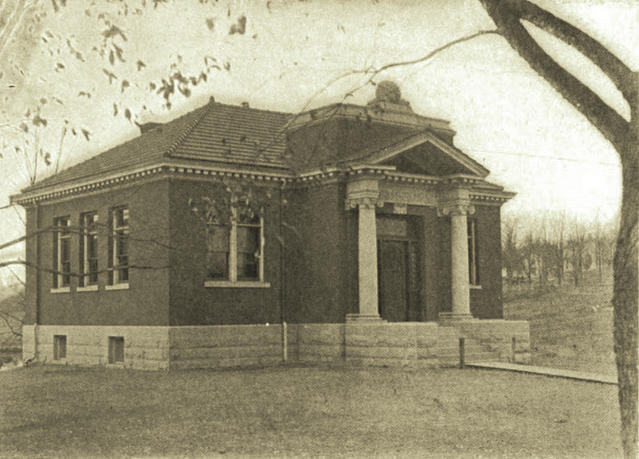
Cordelia A. Greene Public Library

- George H. Calkins, Wisconsin State Assemblyman and physician
- Athelston Gaston, former US Congressman from Pennsylvania
- Cordelia A. Greene, M.D., founder of the Castile Sanitarium; benefactor of the town's Cordelia A. Greene Public Library
- Clara Swain, physician, missionary of the Methodist Episcopal Church
- John B. Halsted, member of the New York State Senate (1856–1859)
- J. C. Stout, racing driver

== Communities and locations in the Town of Castile ==
- Castile – The Village of Castile
- Castile Center – A hamlet on Route 39, north of Castile village
- Fairview – A hamlet on the eastern shore of Silver Lake
- Letchworth State Park – The town borders the park's western side
- Perry – A small part of the Village of Perry is at the northern town line
- Silver Lake – A crescent-shaped lake southeast of Perry, New York and in the western part of the town
- Silver Lake Institute – A community on the eastern shore of Silver Lake
- Silver Lake State Park – a park at the southern end of the lake
- Sowerby Corners – A hamlet on the western side of Silver Lake
