= Exchange Street =

Exchange Street may refer to:

- Exchange Street Historic District (Attica, New York), a national historic district in Attica, Wyoming County, New York
- Exchange Street Historic District (Pawtucket, Rhode Island), a national historic district in Pawtucket, Rhode Island
- Exchange Street (Maine), a commercial street in Portland, Maine
- Buffalo–Exchange Street station, a passenger rail station in Buffalo, New York
