= Epworth Hall (Perry, New York) =

- U.S. National Register of Historic Places
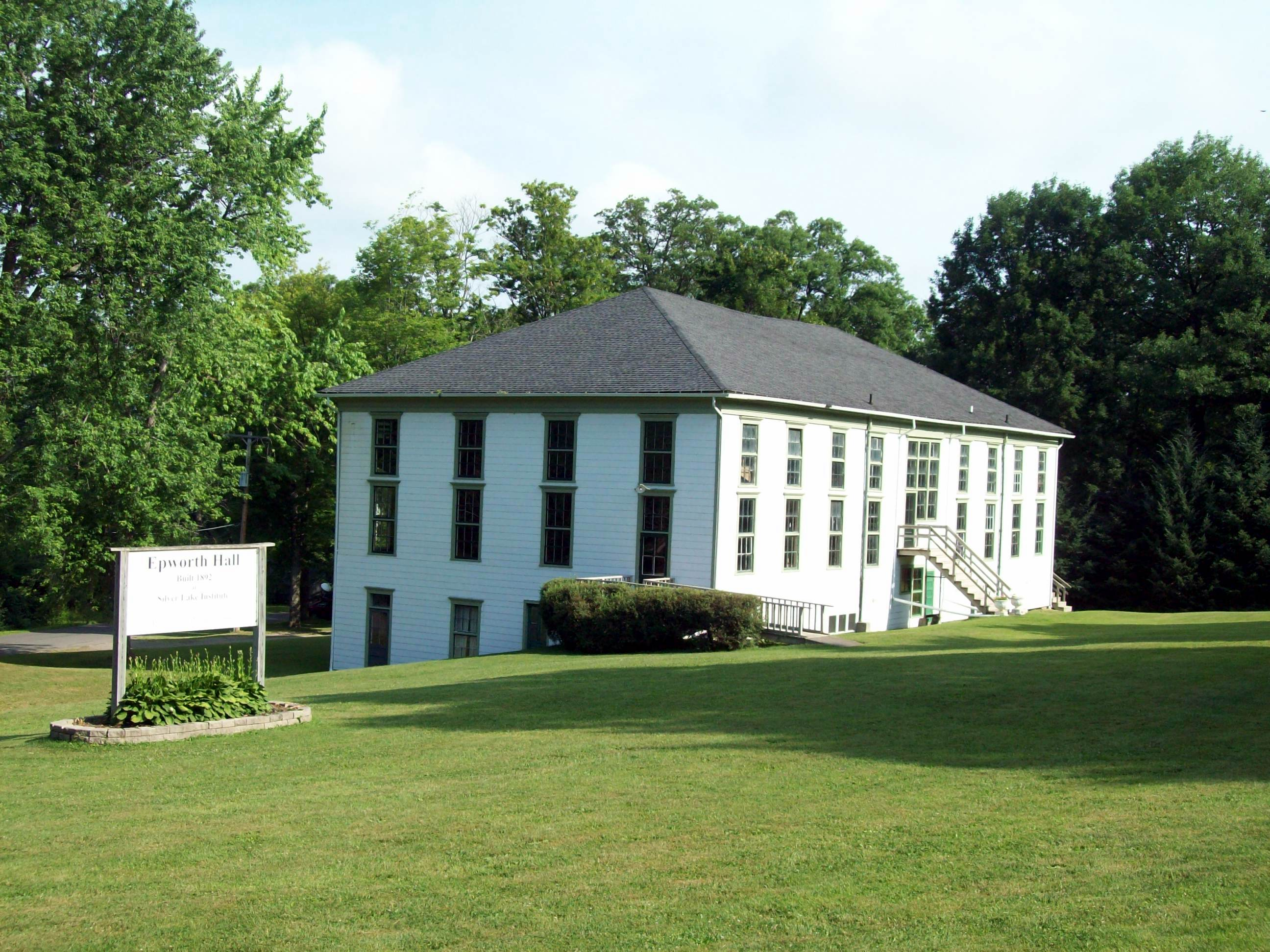
- Epworth Hall, July 2011

- Location within New York Location within the United States
- Nearest city: Perry, New York
- Coordinates: 42°41′53″N 78°1′16″W
- Built: 1892
- Architect: Dyer, Otis
- Architectural style: Colonial Revival
- NRHP reference No.: 00000350
- Added to NRHP: April 06, 2000

Epworth Hall is a historic assembly hall located in Castile township in Wyoming County, New York. It was built in 1892 in the Colonial Revival style and is the largest of three such halls on the grounds of the Silver Lake Institute, a Methodist-affiliated camp facility established in 1873. The two story, 100 feet by 50 feet, multi-purpose building exhibits elements of the Akron Plan in its interior layout.

It was listed on the National Register of Historic Places in 2000.

== Gallery ==
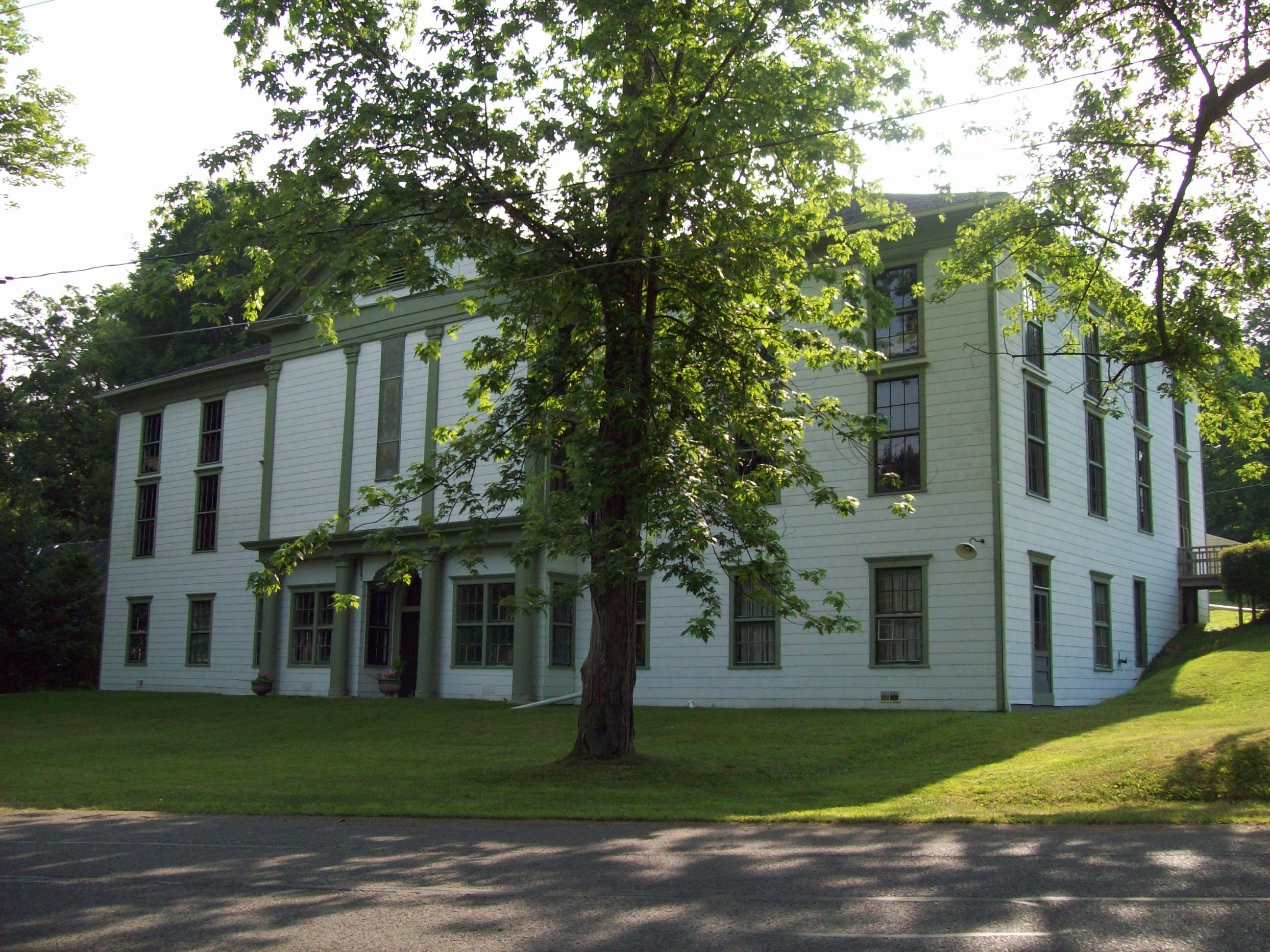
Epworth Hall, July 2011
