= Silver Lake Institute =

Historic district in New York, United States

- Silver Lake Institute Historic District
- U.S. National Register of Historic Places
- U.S. Historic district
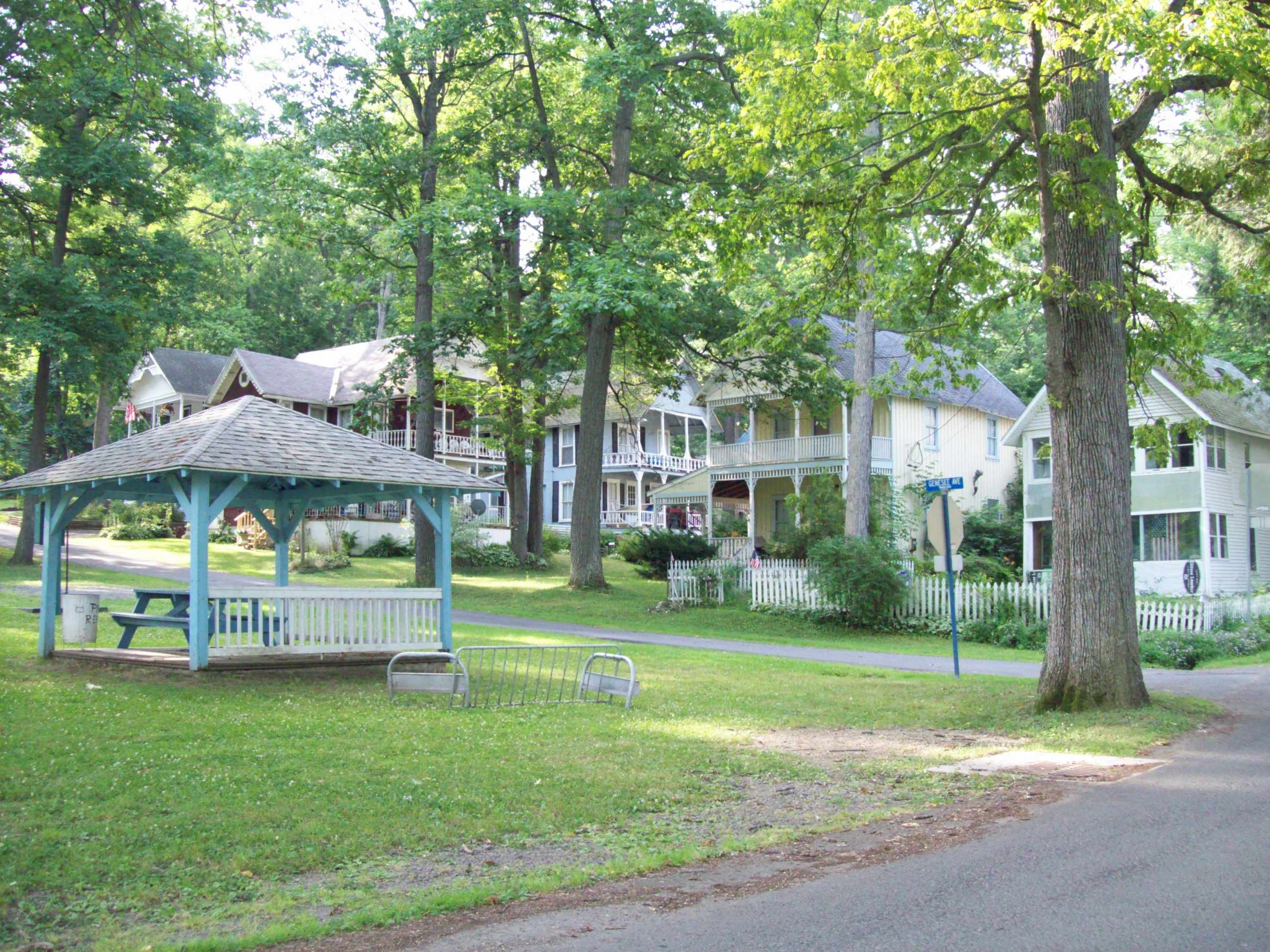
- Silver Lake Institute Historic District, July 2011

- Location within New York Location within the United States
- Location: Roughly bounded by Wesley, Embury, Thompson, Haven, Lakeside & Lakeview Aves., Silver Lake, New York
- Coordinates: 42°41′56″N 78°1′20″W
- Area: 13 acres (5.3 ha)
- Built: 1873
- Architectural style: Colonial Revival, Late Victorian, Gothic Revival
- NRHP reference No.: 85002442
- Added to NRHP: September 19, 1985

Silver Lake Institute is a community in Wyoming County, New York, situated on Silver Lake, south of the village of Perry in the Town of Castile. The community was founded as a Methodist-affiliated camp facility in 1873.

The core of the community was listed as a historic district listed on the National Register of Historic Places (NRHP). The district consists of 13 acres (5.3 ha). The properties reflect the evolution of the institute from a Methodist Revivalist summer camp in the 1870s and 1880s to a cultural, educational, and religious summer institute in the Chautauqua tradition during the 1880s and 1890s, and finally to a secular summer cottage community in the early 20th century. The focal point of the community is the 2.03-acre (0.82 ha) Burt Park and the district includes 72 additional properties including 70 cottages.

The Silver Lake Institute (SLI) was officially re-confirmed in the court action of making SLI an independent organization separate from the Methodist Church. This charter change was re-stated in NYS Supreme Court, Warsaw, NY, on Feb. 2, 2016.

== Geography ==
Silver Lake is located at 42°42′06″N 78°01′19″W (42.701729, -78.021951). Its elevation is 1,375 feet (419 m). The lake is one of few in the United States that has its inlet and outlet at the same end.

== Today ==
Silver Lake has yet to revive the popularity it once had, but it remains a favorite among those in the area. The Perry Public Beach has been recently renovated and hosts Shake on the Lake, a Shakespeare company founded in Silver Lake in 2012. The Pioneer Log Cabin and Museum Is a historic building housing artifacts, and a former schoolhouse is on the grounds, moved from the village of Perry. An annual Pioneer Picnic has been held on the grounds since 1874, occurring on the first Sunday in August. A portion of an Indian Council Tree was relocated at the museum in 1882 from Pavilion, Genesee County, for preservation.
