= First Methodist Episcopal Church of Perry =

Historic church in New York, United States

- U.S. National Register of Historic Places
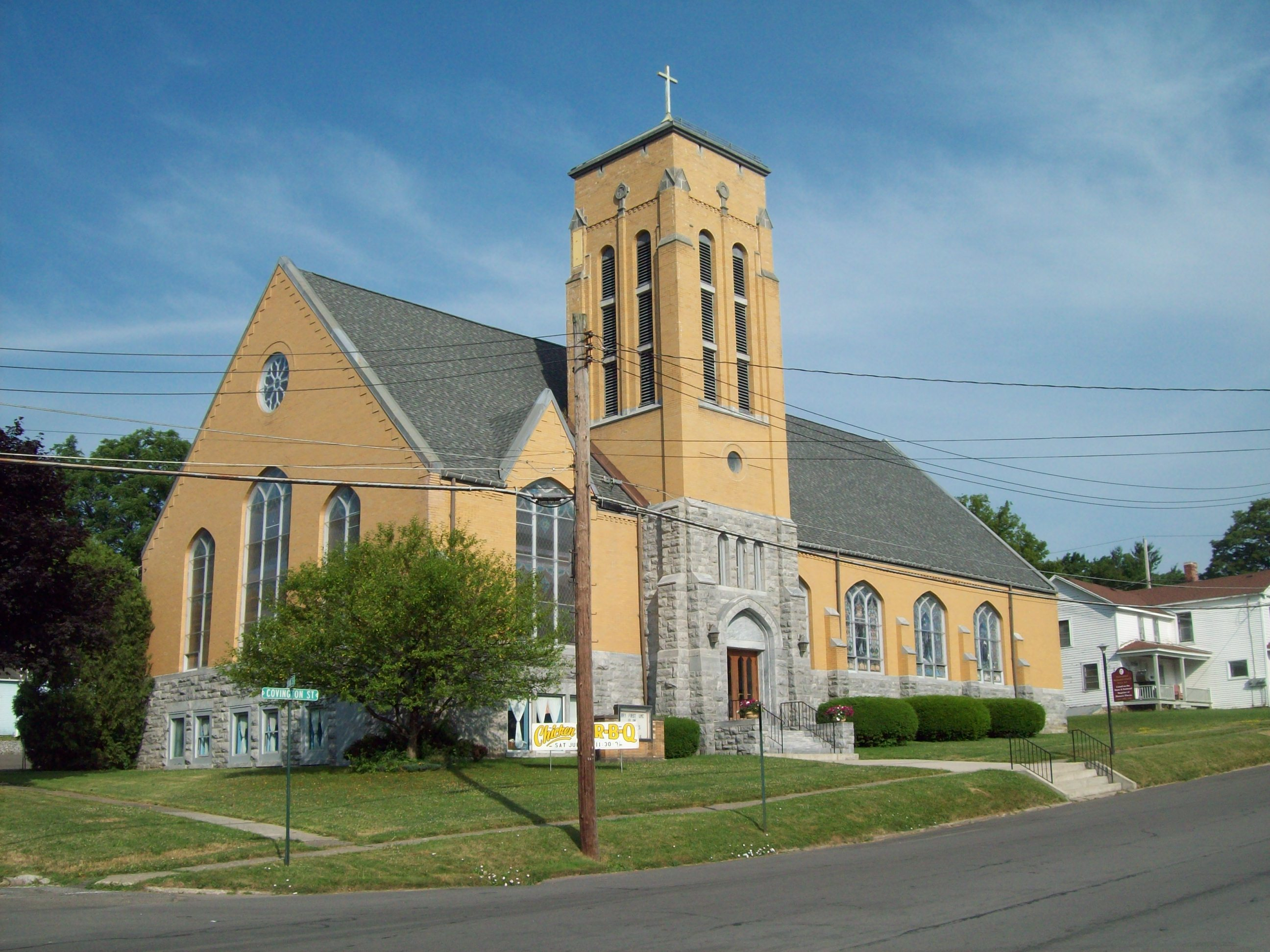
- First Methodist Episcopal Church of Perry, July 2011

- Location within New York Location within the United States
- Location: 35 Covington St., Perry, New York
- Coordinates: 42°43′10″N 78°0′18″W
- Architect: Fay & Dryer
- Architectural style: Late Gothic Revival
- NRHP reference No.: 06000880
- Added to NRHP: September 28, 2006

First Methodist Episcopal Church of Perry, now known as Perry United Methodist Church, is a historic Methodist Episcopal church at Perry in Wyoming County, New York, United States. The Gothic Revival-style church is home to a Methodist congregation dating to 1816. The sanctuary design is in the Akron Plan.

It was listed on the National Register of Historic Places in 2006.
