= Perry Downtown Historic District =

Historic district in New York, United States

- U.S. National Register of Historic Places
- U.S. Historic district
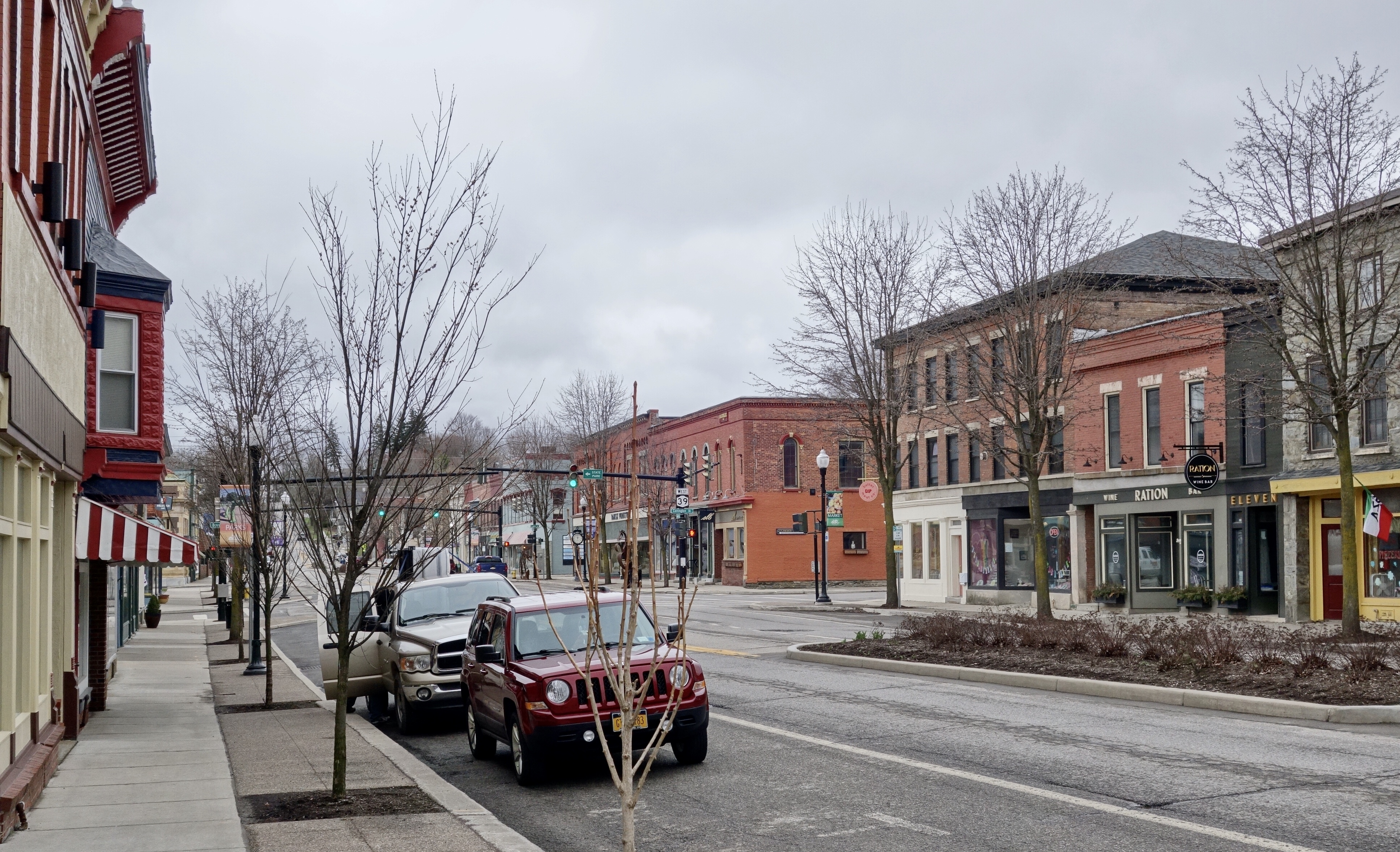
- Perry Downtown Historic District, April 2020

- Location within New York Location within the United States
- Location: N. & S. Main, Covington, & Lake Sts., Borden Ave., Perry, New York
- Coordinates: 42°43′06″N 78°00′07″W
- Area: 8.5 acres (3.4 ha)
- Architectural style: Mixed
- NRHP reference No.: 12000212
- Added to NRHP: November 21, 2012

Perry Downtown Historic District is a national historic district located at Perry in Wyoming County, New York. The district encompasses 41 contributing buildings in the village of Perry. They are a variety of commercial, institutional, and governmental buildings with most built between 1850 and 1918. Most of the commercial buildings are two-stories and constructed of brick. They include the Town Hall (1909), Masonic Temple (1914), Bussey Block (1898), Bailey-Roche Block (c. 1836), A. Cole and Wygant Building (1867), Garrison Building (1901), Rufus Smith Block (1856), Howell Building (1895), Traver Place Apartments (1924), and the Wise Building (1903).

It was listed on the National Register of Historic Places in 2012.

== Gallery ==
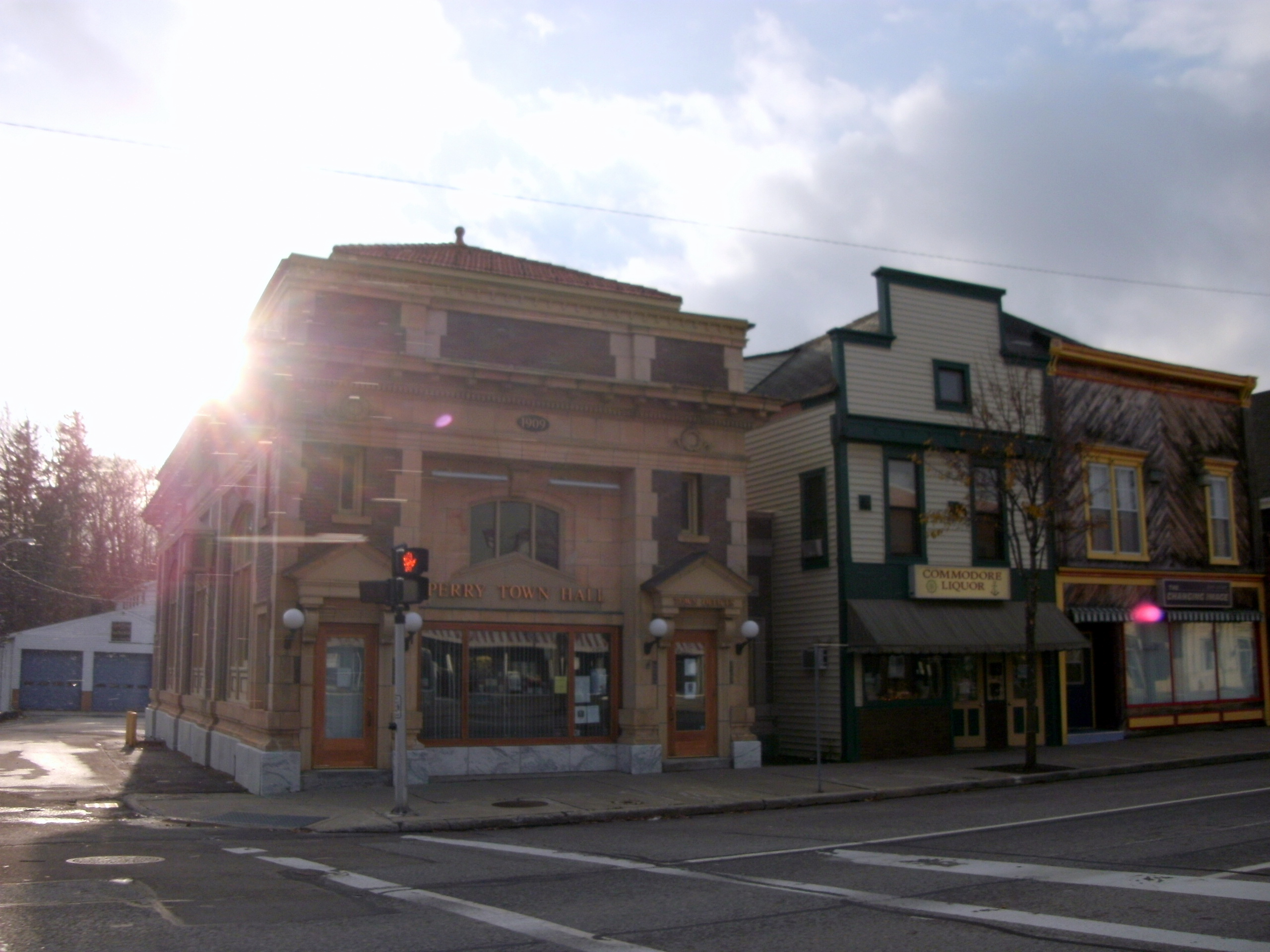
Perry Town Hall and Commercial Buildings, Perry Downtown Historic District, Perry, New York, November 2010
