= United States Post Office (Attica, New York) =

- US Post Office-Attica
- U.S. National Register of Historic Places
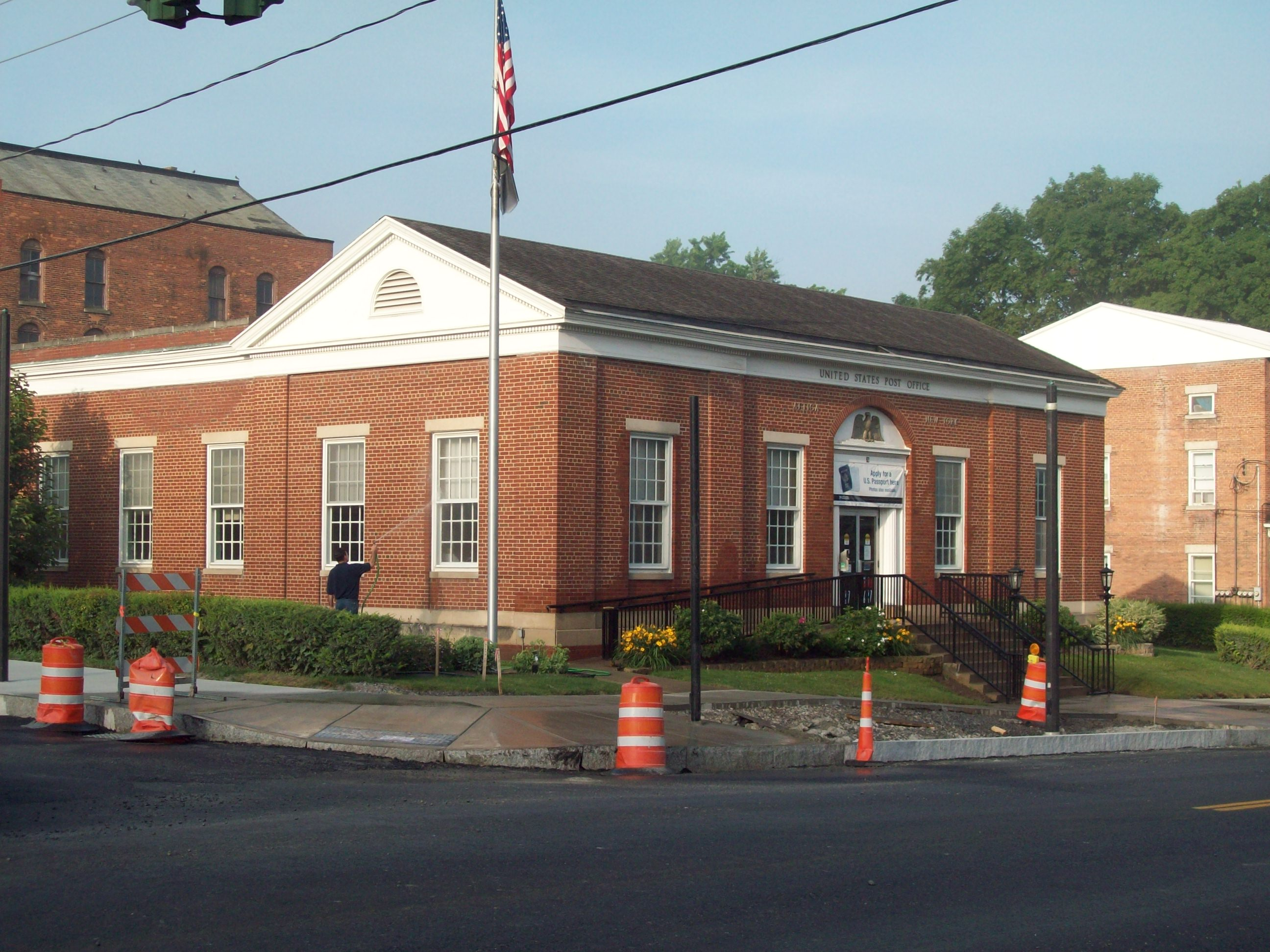
- U.S. Post Office, July 2011

- Location within New York Location within the United States
- Interactive map showing the location of the U.S. Post Office-Attica
- Location: 76 Main St., Attica, New York
- Coordinates: 42°51′49″N 78°16′51″W
- Built: 1936
- Architect: Simon, Louis A.; Donnelly, Thomas
- Architectural style: Colonial Revival
- MPS: US Post Offices in New York State, 1858-1943, TR
- NRHP reference No.: 88002453
- Added to NRHP: November 17, 1988

US Post Office—Attica is a historic post office building located at Attica in Wyoming County, New York. It was designed and built in 1936-1937 as a Works Progress Administration project, and is one of a number of post offices in New York State designed by the Office of the Supervising Architect of the Treasury Department, Louis A. Simon. It is a one-story brick structure on a stone water table in the Colonial Revival style. The interior includes a mural painted in 1938 by Thomas Donnelly and titled Fall in the Genesee Country.

It was listed on the National Register of Historic Places in 1988.
