= Arcade Center Farm =

Historic house in New York, United States

- U.S. National Register of Historic Places
- Location within New York Location within the United States
- Location: 7298 NY 98, Arcade, New York
- Coordinates: 42°32′38″N 78°24′12″W
- Area: 58.9 acres (23.8 ha)
- Built: 1835
- Architectural style: Greek Revival
- NRHP reference No.: 04000290
- Added to NRHP: April 15, 2004

Arcade Center Farm is a historic home and farm complex in Arcade, Wyoming County, New York. The farmhouse is a Greek Revival-style frame structure built about 1835 with a 1 1/2-story main block and 1-story wings. The farm occupies 58.94 acres (238,500 m^{2}) and, in addition to the farmhouse, includes a historic 19th century barn. The property includes a number of other non-contributing structures.

It was listed on the National Register of Historic Places in 2004.
