= Brick Presbyterian Church (Perry, New York) =

Historic church in New York, United States

- U.S. National Register of Historic Places
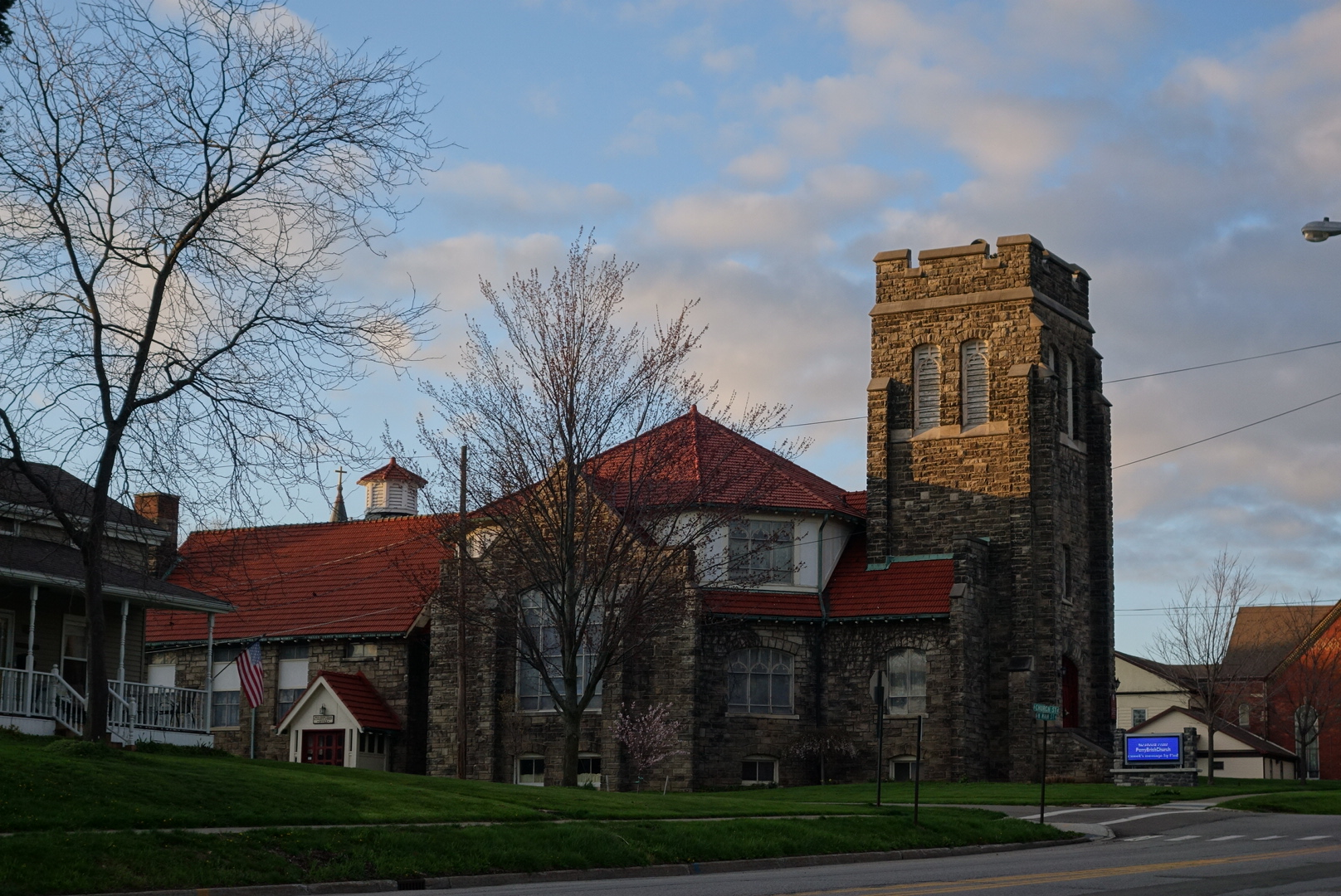
- Brick Presbyterian Church, May 2020

- Location within New York Location within the United States
- Location: 6 Church St., Perry, New York
- Coordinates: 42°43′14.9982″N 78°0′4.7412″W
- Built: 1909
- Architect: Green & Wicks
- Architectural style: Gothic Revival
- NRHP reference No.: 07001042
- Added to NRHP: October 03, 2007

Brick Presbyterian Church is a historic Presbyterian church in Perry, Wyoming County, New York. The Gothic Revival-style church was built in 1909 of randome ashlar Pennsylvania limestone. It consists of a central octagonal structure housing the sanctuary surrounded by wings that give the structure a cruciform appearance. It features a massive square crenellated bell tower. It is a product of the Buffalo architectural firm of Green & Wicks.

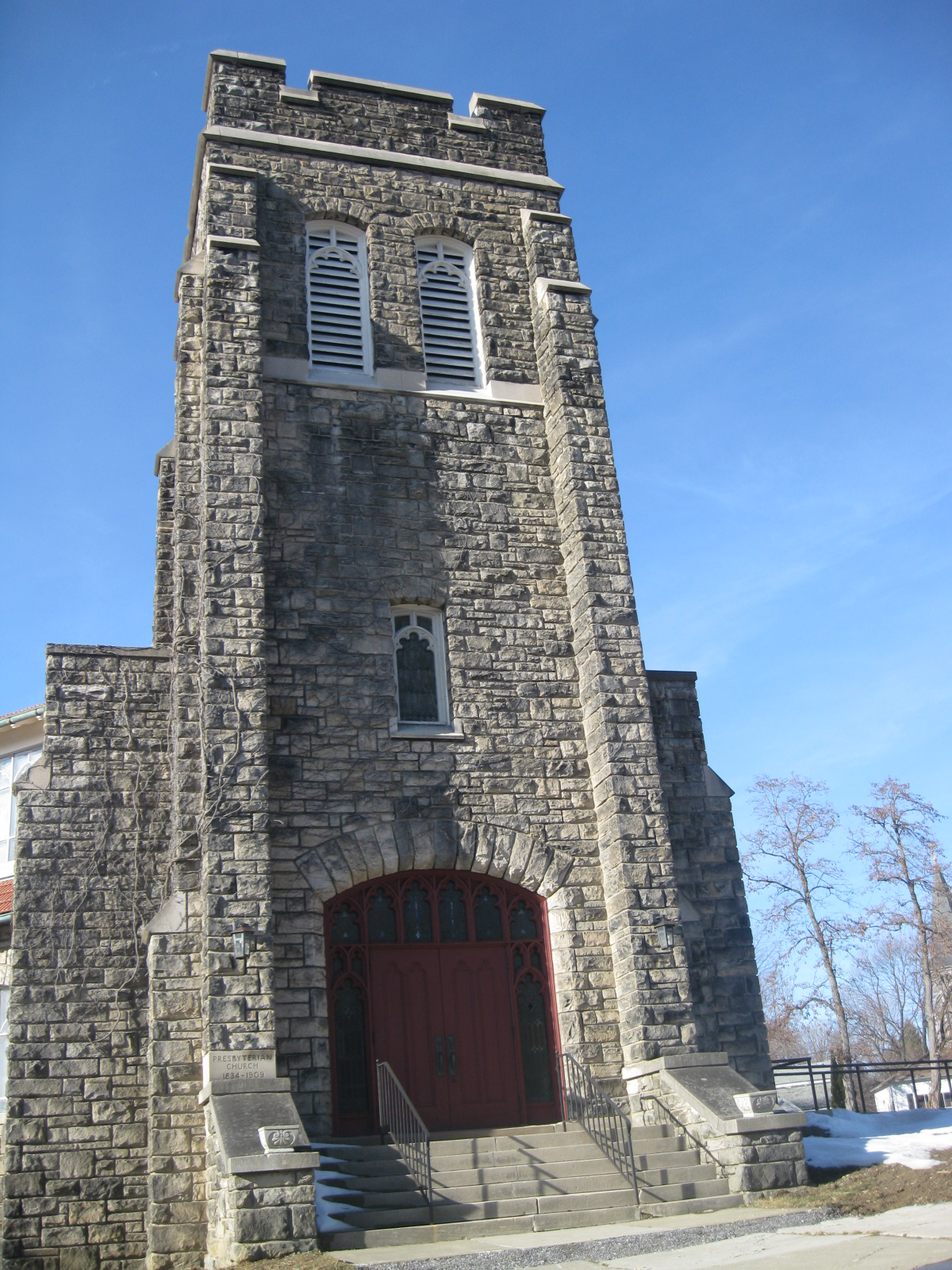
Brick Presbyterian Church, Perry, New York as seen in 2010

The church building replaces an older brick building that was built on the site. The bricks for that church were made in West Perry at the north end of Silver Lake, probably by James Russell Webster, whose property is also on the National Historic Registry.

The current church building was listed on the National Register of Historic Places in 2007.
