= Perry (village), New York =

Perry, New York
- Village
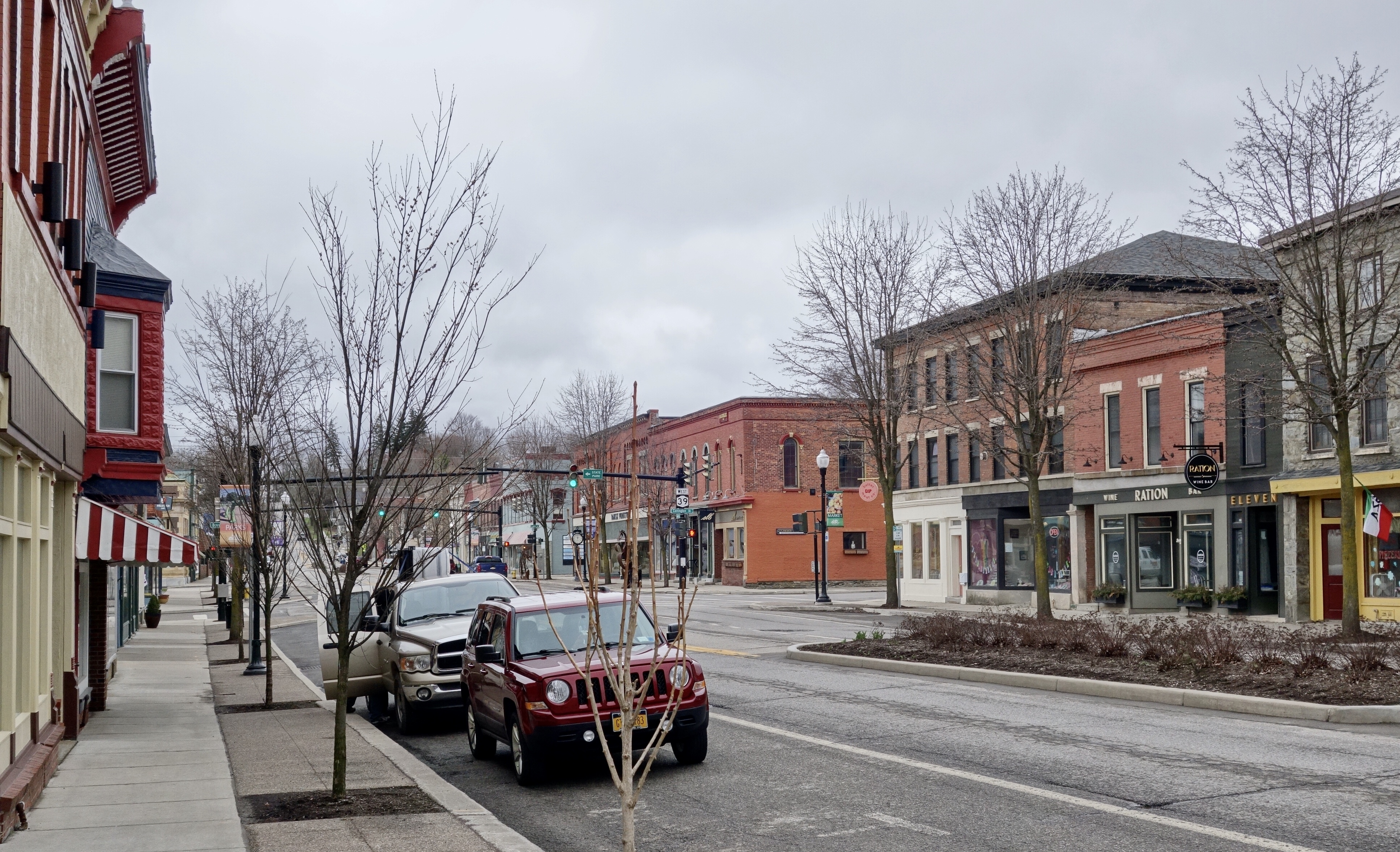
- Main Street, April 2020

- Location within the state of New York
- Coordinates: 42°43′1″N 78°0′16″W
- Country: United States
- State: New York
- County: Wyoming
- Settled: 1809
- Incorporated: May 17, 1830
- Named for: Oliver Hazard Perry

Area
  - Total: 2.45 sq mi (6.34 km^{2})
  - Land: 2.34 sq mi (6.05 km^{2})
  - Water: 0.11 sq mi (0.29 km^{2})
- Elevation: 1,371 ft (418 m)

Population (2020)
  - Total: 3,536
  - Density: 1,512.8/sq mi (584.09/km^{2})
- Time zone: UTC-5 (Eastern (EST))
  - Summer (DST): UTC-4 (EDT)
- ZIP code: 14530
- Area code: 585
- FIPS code: 36-57243
- GNIS feature ID: 0960202
- Website: villageofperryny.gov

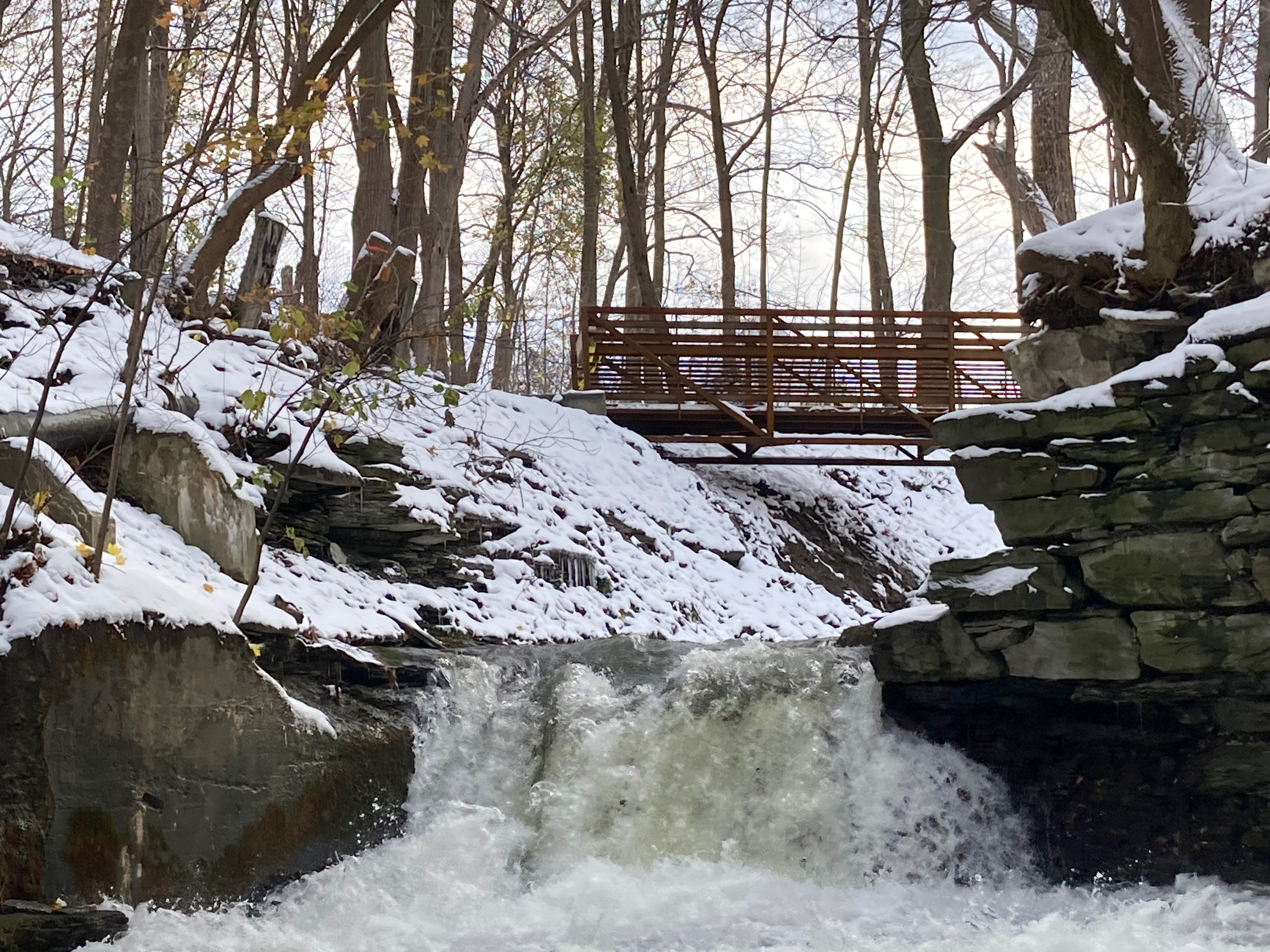
Silver Lake Trail footbridge near Main Street, overlooking secret waterfall behind a 200 year-old former mill.

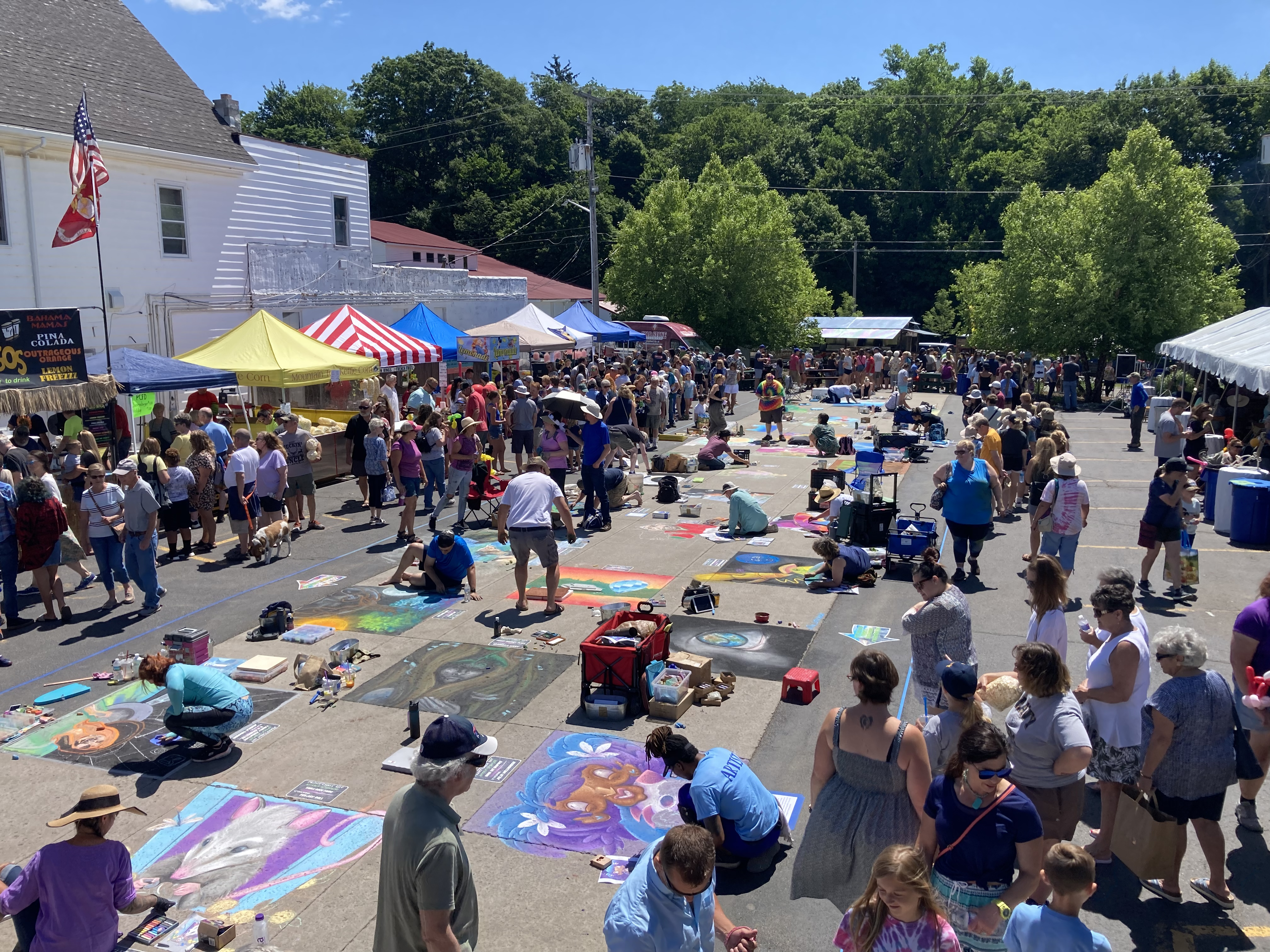
The Perry Chalk Art Festival is one of the area’s signature events, with dozens of professional artists, producing temporary works of art over a one-day period each summer on the second Saturday in July.

Perry is a village in the towns of Perry and Castile in Wyoming County, New York, United States. The population was 3,673 at the 2010 census. The village is at the junction of state routes 39 and 246.

== History ==
The village of Perry was incorporated in 1830.

The Perry Downtown Historic District, First Methodist Episcopal Church of Perry, Brick Presbyterian Church, Barna C. Roup House, and Epworth Hall are listed on the National Register of Historic Places.

On November 27, 2019, Perry signed a Friendship Agreement with the town of Nailsworth, England.

== Amenities ==
As of 2023, Perry has seen a resurgence, with a gain of 36 independent businesses, the establishment of 11 signature events and the creation of hundreds of new jobs village-wide. Perry Farmers' Market, founded in 2002, draws crowds of people to downtown each Saturday morning from mid-June through September. Signature events include the Perry Chalk Art Festival, Tour de Perry, Shake on the Lake, New York State Puppet Festival, Silver Serpent Triathlon and Silver Lake Sea Serpent Arts and Crafts Show. The Village recently renovated its Public Beach, added a Splash Park to its Village Park, completed a Main Street Improvement Project, and a segment of the Silver Lake Trail from the Beach to Main Street. In 2023, Perry was awarded $10 million through New York State's Downtown Revitalization Initiative to support a variety of public and private sector projects, including continued expansion of the Trail, renovation of the Assembly Hall, and new or renovated buildings adding over 60 new housing units over the next several years.

== Demographics ==
Historical population
Census	Pop.	Note	%±
1870	867		—
1880	1,115		28.6%
1890	1,528		37.0%
1900	2,763		80.8%
1910	4,388		58.8%
1920	4,717		7.5%
1930	4,231		−10.3%
1940	4,468		5.6%
1950	4,533		1.5%
1960	4,629		2.1%
1970	4,538		−2.0%
1980	4,198		−7.5%
1990	4,219		0.5%
2000	3,945		−6.5%
2010	3,673		−6.9%
2020	3,536		−3.7%
U.S. Decennial Census

As of the census of 2000, there were 3,945 people, 1,560 households, and 1,051 families residing in the village. The population density was 1,744.8 inhabitants per square mile (673.7/km^{2}). There were 1,764 housing units at an average density of 780.2 per square mile (301.2/km^{2}). The racial makeup of the village was 97.41% White, 0.74% Black or African American, 0.15% Native American, 0.35% Asian, 0.03% Pacific Islander, 0.46% from other races, and 0.86% from two or more races. Hispanic or Latino of any race were 1.55% of the population.

There were 1,560 households, out of which 33.1% had children under the age of 18 living with them, 48.1% were married couples living together, 13.9% had a female householder with no husband present, and 32.6% were non-families. 27.1% of all households were made up of individuals, and 12.9% had someone living alone who was 65 years of age or older. The average household size was 2.48 and the average family size was 2.97.

In the village, the population was spread out, with 25.8% under the age of 18, 8.4% from 18 to 24, 28.2% from 25 to 44, 22.6% from 45 to 64, and 15.0% who were 65 years of age or older. The median age was 37 years. For every 100 females, there were 92.9 males. For every 100 females age 18 and over, there were 88.0 males.

The median income for a household in the village was $35,596, and the median income for a family was $41,090. Males had a median income of $31,845 versus $21,486 for females. The per capita income for the village was $16,794. About 6.5% of families and 8.7% of the population were below the poverty line, including 12.8% of those under age 18 and 2.6% of those age 65 or over.

== Government ==
Perry is governed by a board of trustees composed of a mayor, deputy mayor, and three trustees. The current Board is composed of Mayor Rick Hauser, Deputy Mayor Arlene Lapiana, and Trustees Sandy Lawrence, Joel Bouchard, and Richard Muolo.

== Geography ==
Perry is located at 42°43′0″N 78°0′16″W (42.716876, -78.004582).

According to the United States Census Bureau, the village has a total area of 2.4 square miles (6.1 km^{2}), of which 2.3 square miles (5.9 km^{2}) is land and 0.1 square mile (0.3 km^{2}) (4.64%) is water.

Perry is at the northeast end of Silver Lake. It is west of Letchworth State Park and northeast of Silver Lake State Park.

== Notable people ==
- Chester A. Arthur, the twenty-first President of the United States, spent some of his childhood years in the Village of Perry after being born in Vermont
- James M. Bingham, former Lt. Governor of Wisconsin
- C. W. Dibble, former University at Buffalo football coach
- J. Francis Harter, former US Congressman
- Edwin B. Kelsey, former US Congressman
- William D. Metz, Rhode Island historian
- Lewis B. Parsons Jr., brigadier general for the Union Army in the Civil War
- David Rubio, stringed musical instruments maker
- Thomas Blanchard Stowell, distinguished educator
- Irving C. Tomlinson, Unitarian minister who became a prominent early Christian Scientist

== See also ==
- List of villages in New York
