= Silver Lake State Park (New York) =

State park in Wyoming County, New York

- Location within New York
- Type: State park
- Location: 4229 W Lake Road; Castile, New York
- Coordinates: 42°40′41″N 78°03′04″W
- Area: 776 acres (3.14 km^{2})
- Operator: New York State Office of Parks, Recreation and Historic Preservation
- Visitors: 37,814 (in 2025)
- Open: All year
- Website: Silver Lake State Park

Silver Lake State Park is a 776-acre (3.14 km^{2}) state park located near the south end of Silver Lake in the Town of Castile in Wyoming County, New York.

The park offers picnic tables, hiking, fishing, seasonal deer and small game hunting, cross-country skiing, and a boat launch.

== See also ==
- List of New York state parks
