= Augustus A. Smith House =

Historic house in New York, United States

- U.S. National Register of Historic Places
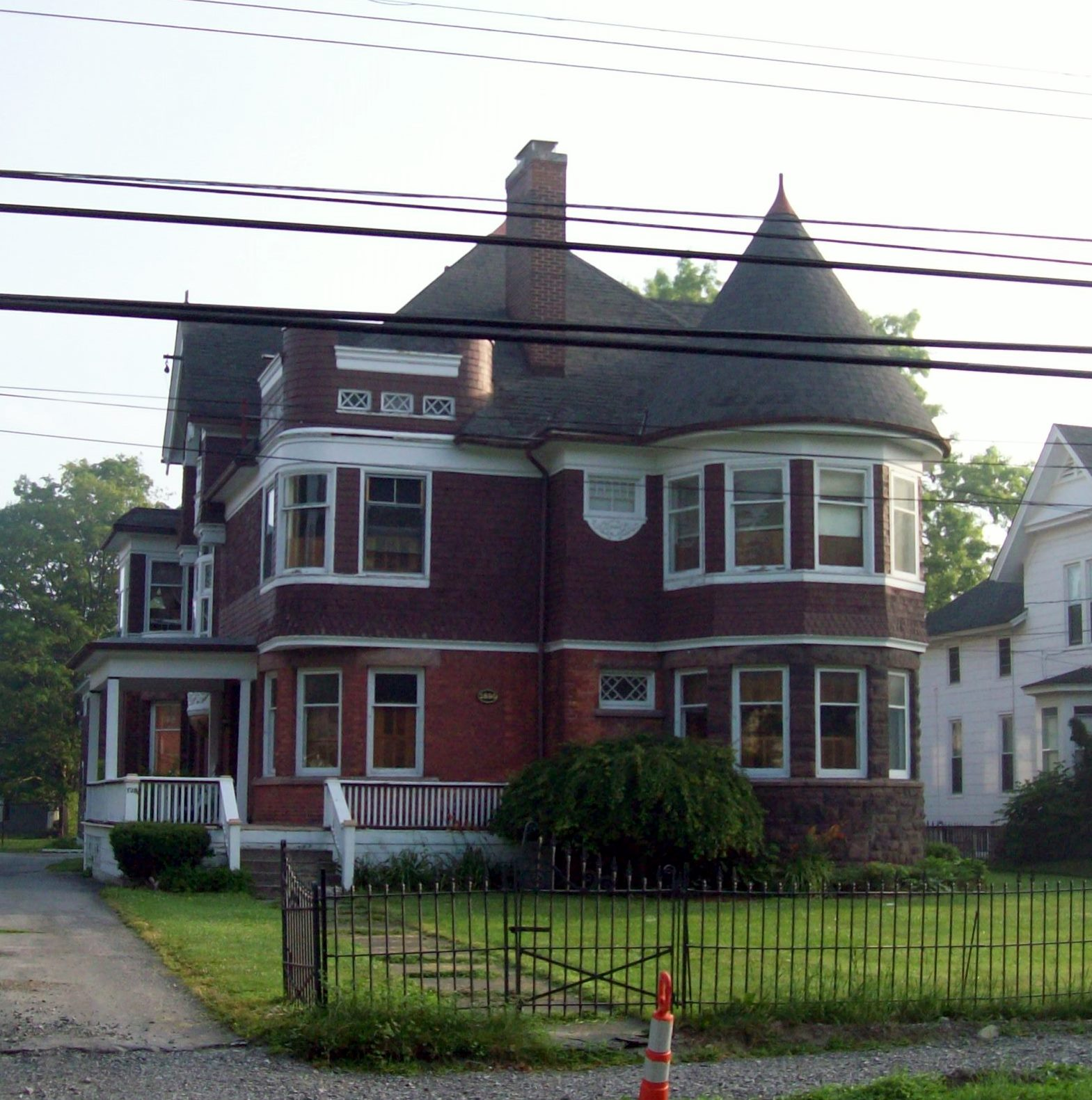
- Augustus A. Smith House, July 2011

- Location within New York Location within the United States
- Location: 125 Main St., Attica, New York
- Coordinates: 42°51′44.0496″N 78°16′42.009″W
- Built: 1890; 136 years ago
- Architectural style: Queen Anne
- NRHP reference No.: 07000627
- Added to NRHP: June 27, 2007; 19 years ago

Augustus A. Smith House, also known as Germain House, is a historic home located at Attica in Wyoming County, New York. It is a large, irregularly massed Queen Anne style residence constructed in 1890. It features a large two story, semi-circular window bay on the south facade and other fine architectural details in keeping with its style.

It was listed on the National Register of Historic Places in 2007.
