= Barna C. Roup House =

Historic house in New York, United States

- U.S. National Register of Historic Places
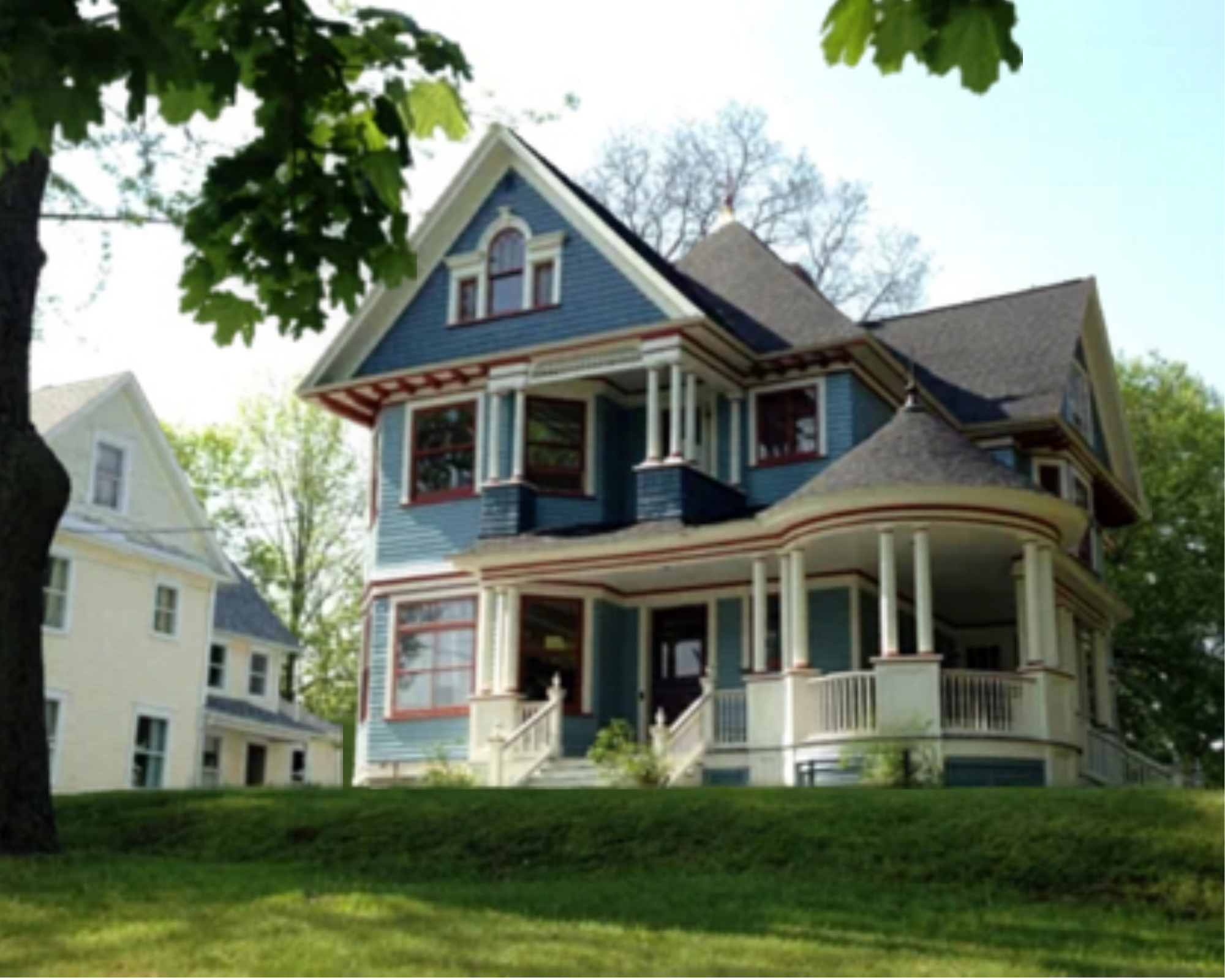
- The Barna C. Roup House in 2016 after restoration

- Location within New York Location within the United States
- Location: N. & S. Main, Covington, & Lake Sts., Borden Ave., Perry, New York
- Coordinates: 42°43′02″N 78°00′12″W
- Area: 0.89 acres (0.36 ha)
- Built: 1898, c. 1927
- Architect: J. Mills Platt
- Architectural style: Queen Anne
- NRHP reference No.: 15000519
- Added to NRHP: August 10, 2015

Barna C. Roup House is a historic home located at Perry in Wyoming County, New York. It was built in 1898, and is a 3-story, Queen Anne-style frame dwelling with a 1927 addition. It features intersecting gable roofs, asymmetrical massing, polygonal bays on three sides, and an elaborately detailed, wrap-around porch. The porch is supported by Doric order columns and has a turreted roof and a small balcony above. The house was built by a notable local attorney during a period of major growth in the village.

It was listed on the National Register of Historic Places in 2015. The house was renovated in 2016 by Barna C. Roup LLC, an organization that purchased the house out of foreclosure and has restored several other buildings in downtown Perry. It was listed for purchase in August of that year.

== Architecture ==
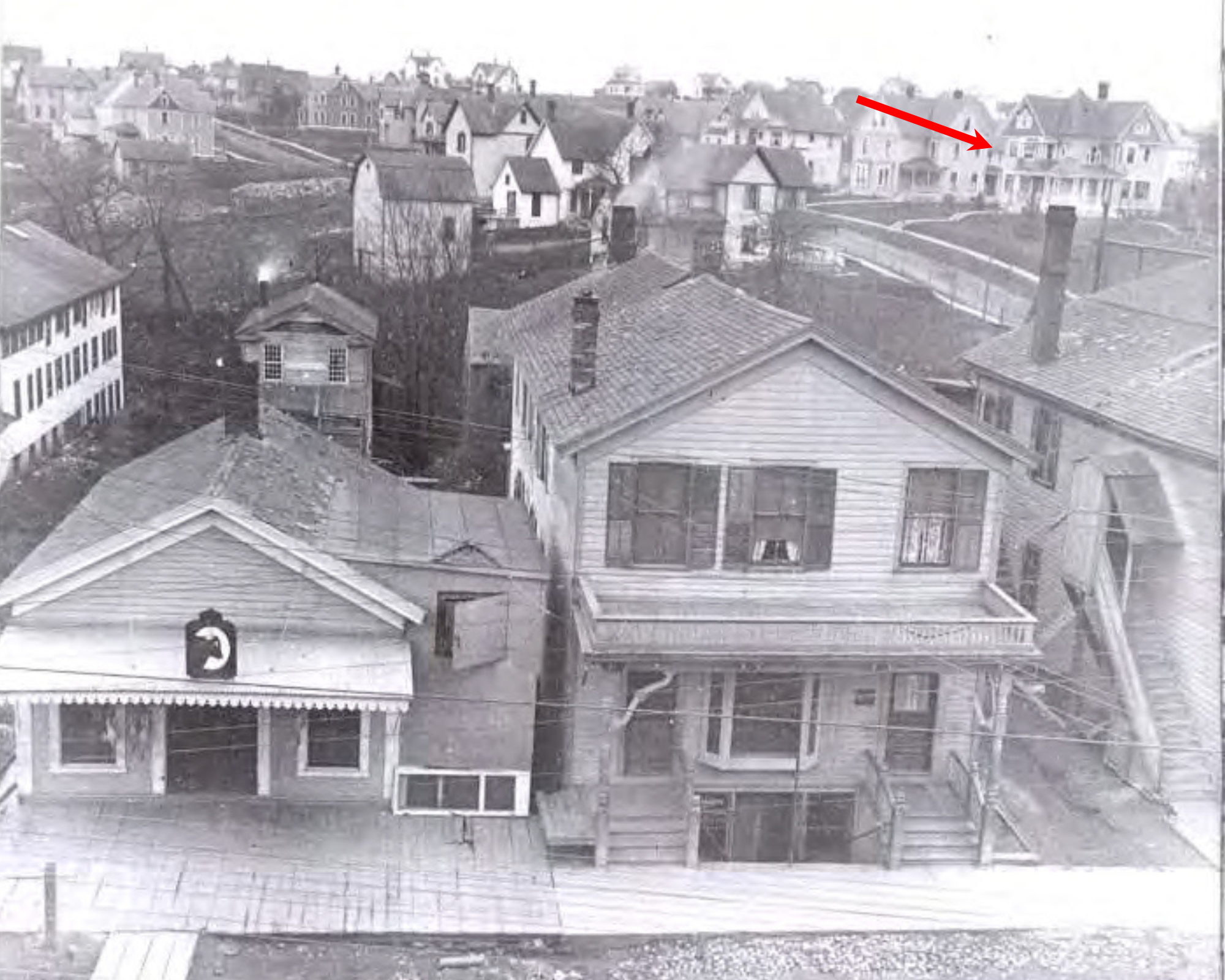
This view shows the slight rise on which the Roup House is sited, and gives some suggestion of its relationship to the nearby commercial area of Perry. (Clark Rice Collection #3781, Perry Public Library, Perry, NY)

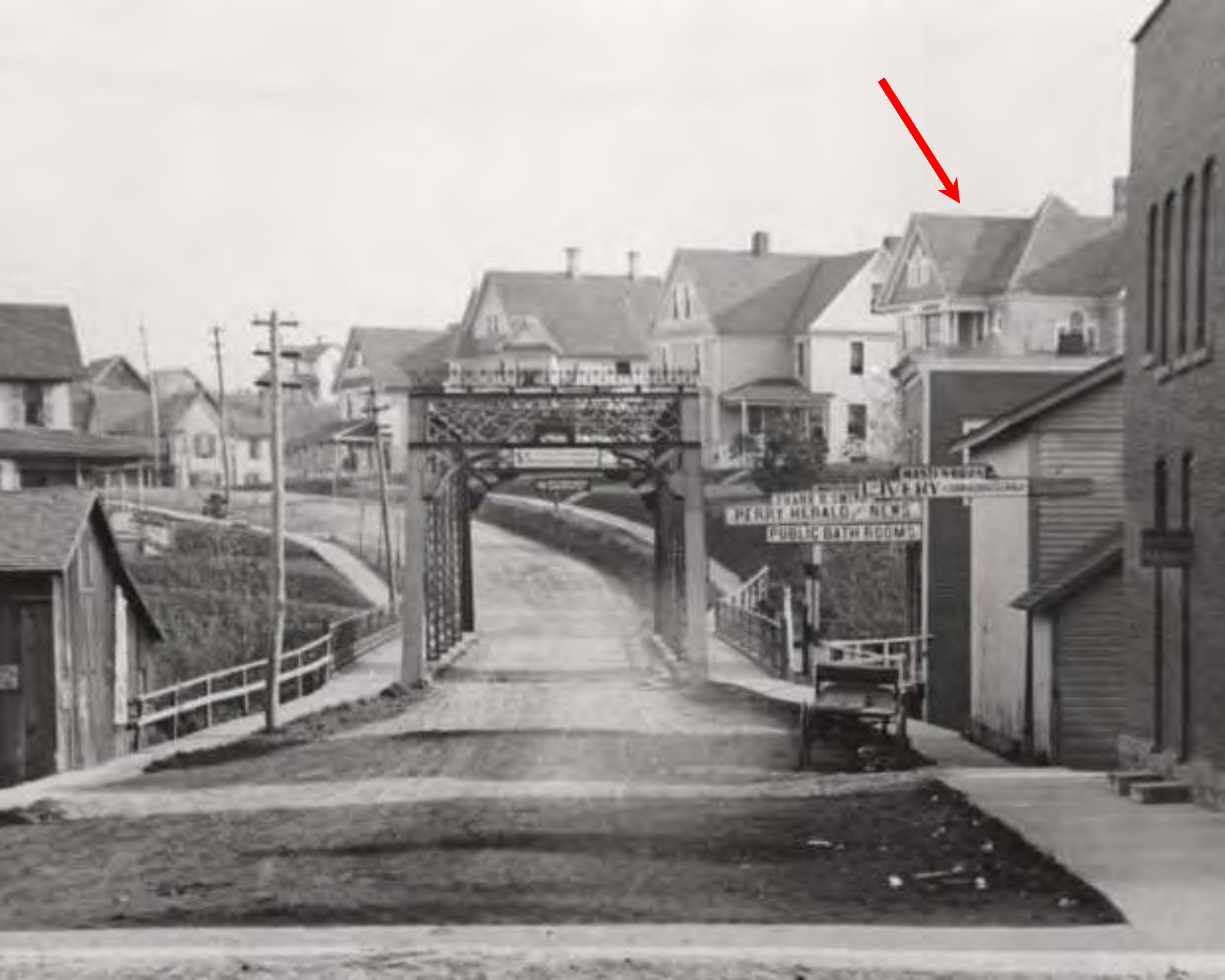
Looking southeast down Borden Avenue, showing houses across the bridge (ca. 1900-1905). The Roup House is the first house after the bridge, and is indicated with the arrow.(Henry Page Collection, Perry Public Library, Perry, NY)

The Barna C. Roup House is a 3-story, wood-frame residence constructed in 1898 in the Queen Anne style. It features elements of the Free Classic variant. The house is characterized by asymmetrical massing, intersecting gable roofs, and a modified rectangular plan. Exterior finishes include painted wood clapboard siding. There are cedar shingles in the gable ends and on the balcony. The house sits on a dressed stone foundation with sections of rock-faced concrete associated with later additions.

The house includes a wraparound porch that extends across the north and west elevations and is joined at the corner by a circular projection with a turreted roof. The porch is supported by paired and tripled Doric columns set on paneled bases. An upper balcony with decorative balustrades is present. The porch is raised and located at the building’s corner. Polygonal bay windows are found on multiple elevations. These elements result in a varied exterior.

The north façade includes recessed porch and balcony spaces and a projecting polygonal bay. A front-facing gable contains a three-part Palladian window with decorative muntins and molded detailing. Brackets and layered trim elements are present. A hipped roof section at the northwest corner connects with the intersecting gables.

The west elevation includes recessed and projecting forms, ending in a two-story bay beneath a gable. A deep overhanging soffit, supported by closely spaced brackets, is present at the attic level. The bay is offset beneath the gable.

The eastern elevation is comparatively restrained in detail. It has a shallow two-story polygonal bay and a cross gable finished in wood shingles. A small dormer is located toward the rear. Historical maps indicate that a porch on this side was enclosed and expanded around 1927. This area was adapted for use as a medical office.

The south (rear) elevation is the most simplified, with minimal ornamentation and limited fenestration. A one-story projection with a shallow hipped roof extends from this side. This appears to date to early 20th-century alterations. The rear entrance occupies a historic opening. However, the door itself is a later replacement.

The house retains original decorative features, including stained-glass windows and diamond-paned attic windows. Some alterations and window replacements have occurred, but elements of the late 19th-century design remain.
