= Arcade, New York =

Arcade
- Town
- Location in Wyoming County and the state of New York.
- Coordinates: 42°32′24″N 78°24′36″W
- Country: United States
- State: New York
- County: Wyoming

Area
  - Total: 47.11 sq mi (122.01 km^{2})
  - Land: 47.00 sq mi (121.74 km^{2})
  - Water: 0.10 sq mi (0.27 km^{2})

Population (2020)
  - Total: 4,220 ▲
  - Estimate (2021): 4,219
  - Density: 87/sq mi (33.7/km^{2})
- FIPS code: 36-121-02418

Arcade is a town in Wyoming County, New York, United States. The population was 4,220 at the 2020 census.

The Town of Arcade has within its borders a village also called Arcade. Arcade is in the southwestern corner of Wyoming County.

== History ==
The Town of Arcade was established in 1807 as the "Town of China." The name changed to Arcade in 1866. Arcade was previously part of the Town of Sheldon.

The Arcade and Attica Railroad provides freight service along its right-of-way and excursions in passenger trains powered by steam locomotives.

The Arcade Center Farm was listed on the National Register of Historic Places in 2004.

== Geography ==
The southern town line is the boundary of Cattaraugus County and the western town line is the border of Erie County.

According to the United States Census Bureau, the town has a total area of 47.2 square miles (122.2 km^{2}), of which 47.1 square miles (121.9 km^{2}) is land and 0.1 square mile (0.3 km^{2}# #0.21%) is water.

Cattaraugus Creek flows southward through the town to Arcade village.

New York State Route 39 runs west-to-east through the town, and New York State Route 98 runs north-to-south.

=== Climate ===
This climatic region is typified by large seasonal temperature differences, with warm to hot (and often humid) summers and cold (sometimes severely cold) winters. According to the Köppen Climate Classification system, Arcade has a humid continental climate, abbreviated "Dfb" on climate maps.

== Demographics ==
Historical population
Census	Pop.	Note	%±
1820	780		—
1830	2,387		206.0%
1840	1,437		−39.8%
1850	1,961		36.5%
1860	2,037		3.9%
1870	1,742		−14.5%
1880	2,000		14.8%
1890	1,840		−8.0%
1900	1,877		2.0%
1910	2,131		13.5%
1920	2,412		13.2%
1930	2,404		−0.3%
1940	2,387		−0.7%
1950	2,570		7.7%
1960	2,861		11.3%
1970	3,048		6.5%
1980	3,714		21.9%
1990	3,938		6.0%
2000	4,184		6.2%
2010	4,205		0.5%
2020	4,220		0.4%
2021 (est.)	4,219	▼	0.0%
U.S. Decennial Census

As of the census of 2000, there were 4,184 people, 1,672 households, and 1,131 families residing in the town. The population density was 88.9 people per square mile #34.3/km^{2}. There were 1,854 housing units at an average density of 39.4 per square mile #15,2/km^{2}. The racial makeup of the town was 98.52% White, 0.22% Black or African American, 0.22% Native American, 0.38% Asian, 0.02% Pacific Islander, 0.17% from other races, and 0.48% from two or more races. Hispanic or Latino of any race were 0.86% of the population.

There were 1,672 households, out of which 33.1% had children under the age of 18 living with them, 53.6% were married couples living together, 9.9% had a female householder with no husband present, and 32.3% were non-families. 28.3% of all households were made up of individuals, and 12.9% had someone living alone who was 65 years of age or older. The average household size was 2.50 and the average family size was 3.06.

In the town, the population was spread out, with 27.2% under the age of 18, 7.3% from 18 to 24, 28.2% from 25 to 44, 23.4% from 45 to 64, and 14.0% who were 65 years of age or older. The median age was 38 years. For every 100 females there were 94.2 males. For every 100 females age 18 and over, there were 91.8 males.

The median income for a household in the town was $35,982, and the median income for a family was $43,077. Males had a median income of $32,936 versus $22,222 for females. The per capita income for the town was $16,820. About 3.7% of families and 7.1% of the population were below the poverty line, including 7.3% of those under age 18 and 9.9% of those age 65 or over.

== Communities and locations ==
- Arcade – The Village of Arcade is in the southwestern corner of the town.
- Arcade Center – A hamlet at the corner of Old Cattaraugus Road and Genesee Road.
- Arcade and Attica Station – Located in Arcade Village.
- East Arcade – A hamlet on East Arcade Road in the eastern part of the town.
- Punkshire Corners – A hamlet in the northwestern corner of the town.

== Education ==
It is in the Yorkshire-Pioneer Central School District.

== Notable people ==
- Daniel F. Bakeman, last survivor receiving a veteran's pension for service in the American Revolutionary War
- Paul Evans, former college basketball coach at Navy and Pittsburgh
- Fran Striker, creator and writer of The Lone Ranger radio and television series, had a summer home in Arcade, and is buried at Arcade Rural Cemetery.

== See also ==
- Arcade and Attica Railroad
