= Attica Market and Main Historic District =

Historic district in New York, United States

- U.S. National Register of Historic Places
- U.S. Historic district
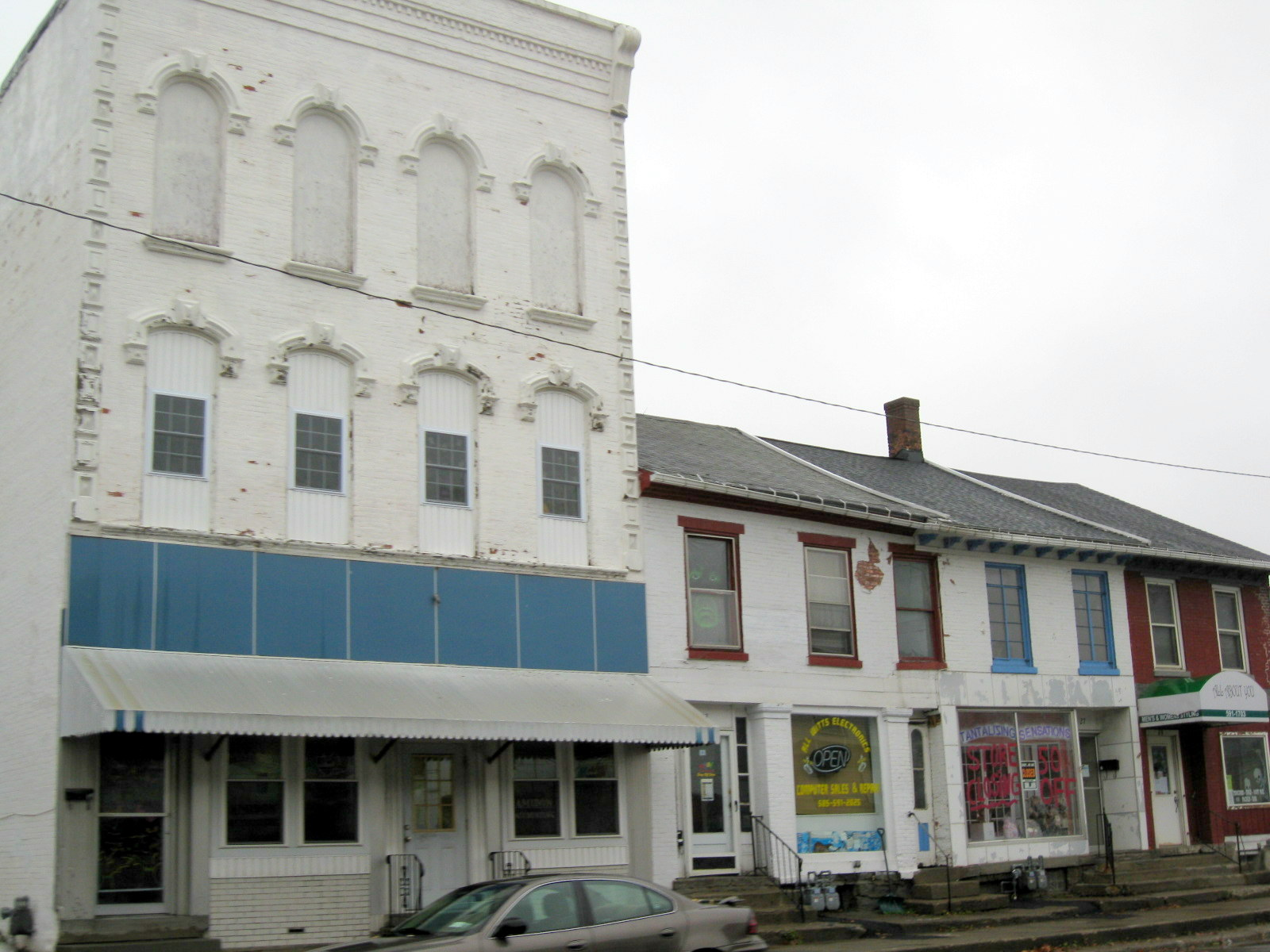
- Market Street, Attica Market and Main Historic District, October 2009

- Location within New York Location within the United States
- Location: 2-28 & 19-45 Market St., 2-10 & 21-39 Main St., Attica, New York
- Coordinates: 42°51′55″N 78°17′05″W
- Area: 2.82 acres (1.14 ha)
- Built: c. 1827-1915
- Architectural style: Italianate, Gothic Revival, Second Empire, Romanesque Revival, Classical Revival, Renaissance Revival, Art Deco
- NRHP reference No.: 13000225
- Added to NRHP: May 1, 2013

Attica Market and Main Historic District is a national historic district in Attica, New York. The district encompasses 23 contributing buildings in the central business district of Attica. The district developed between about 1827 and 1915, and includes buildings in a variety of architectural styles including Greek Revival, Italianate, Second Empire, and Romanesque Revival. Notable buildings include the Farmer's Bank (1856), Walbridge Block (1853), Pfender Block (c. 1855), Young-Krauss Block (1907), Scott Building (1827), American Hall (1872), the Hardware Block (1853), and Masonic Temple (1908).

It was listed on the National Register of Historic Places in 2013.
