= Attica (village), New York =

Attica, New York
- Village
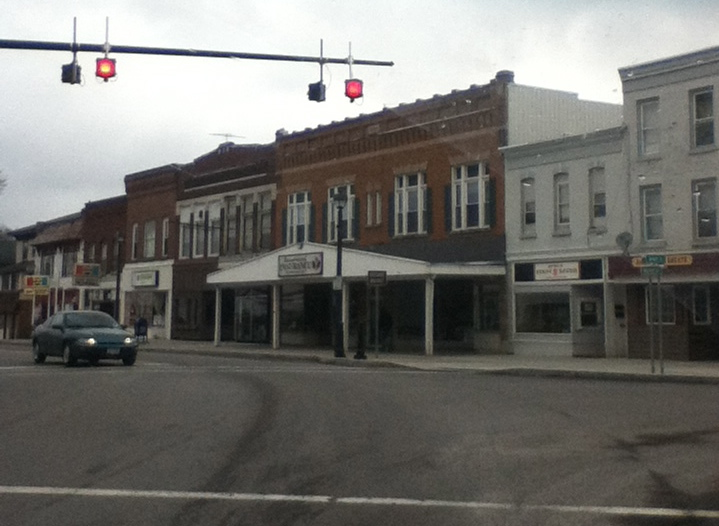
- Motto: "Attica ... By Choice!"
- Location within New York Location within the United States
- Coordinates: 42°51′54″N 78°16′37″W
- Country: United States
- State: New York
- Counties: Wyoming, Genesee
- Towns: Attica, Alexander
- Settled: 1802
- Incorporated: May 2, 1837
- Named for: Attica, Ancient Greece

Area
  - Total: 1.69 sq mi (4.38 km^{2})
  - Land: 1.69 sq mi (4.38 km^{2})
  - Water: 0 sq mi (0.00 km^{2})
- Elevation: 981 ft (299 m)

Population (2020)
  - Total: 2,450
  - Density: 1,449/sq mi (559.4/km^{2})
- Time zone: UTC-5 (Eastern (EST))
  - Summer (DST): UTC-4 (EDT)
- ZIP code: 14011
- Area code: 585
- FIPS code: 36-03001
- GNIS feature ID: 0942677
- Website: villageofatticany.gov

Attica is a village in Wyoming and Genesee counties, New York, United States. The population was 2,547 at the 2010 census.

The village is on the northern border of Wyoming County. The village lies mostly within the town of Attica, but the northern part of the village is within the adjacent town of Alexander in Genesee County.

== History ==
In 1802, Zerah Phelps became the first European-American landowner in the Attica area, which had for centuries been part of territory of the Seneca Nation, one of the Five Nations of the Iroquois Confederacy. As allies of the British, they were mostly forced out of New York after the American Revolution, when the Crown ceded control of its territory to the new United States.

He built and owned a gristmill, and was also the first business owner in Attica. By 1810 the settlement had grown into a town., Malaria and plague drove the settlers to higher ground. During the War of 1812, many people fled to this area from Buffalo, which was vulnerable to British attack from the Great Lakes.

In 1837, Phelps' Settlement was incorporated, becoming the village of Attica. The village is named after a region in Greece.

In 1854, Dr. Orin Davis established a health institute to which people from around the country traveled for treatment.

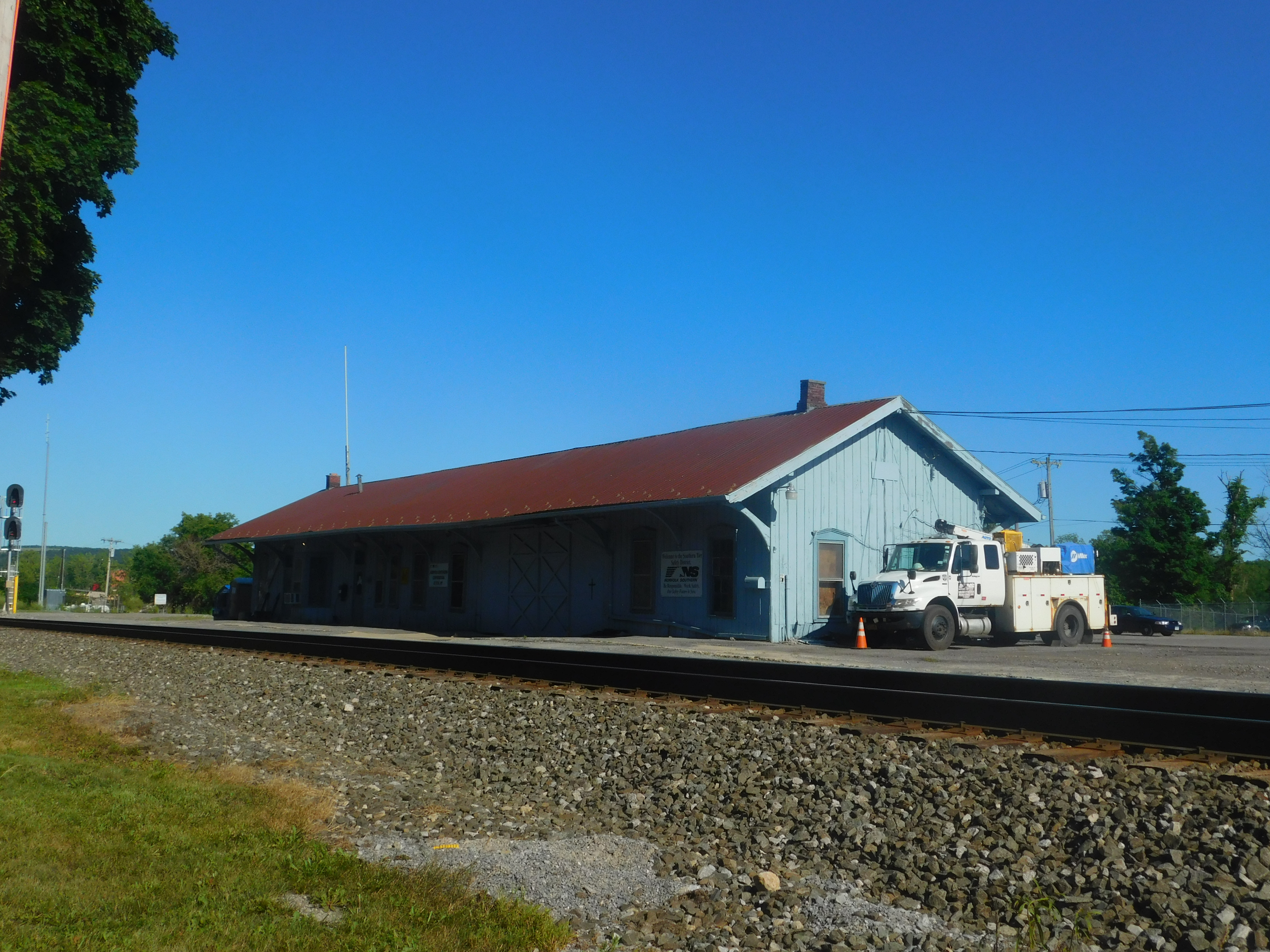
Attica's former Erie Railroad station, now used by Norfolk Southern

In 1883, Eugene Norton created what became known as the Pineapple Cheese Factory. In 1918 the company's molds and patents were sold to the Kraft Cheese Company. The Stevens family has bred and raised thoroughbred livestock. One of their horses took first prize at the World's Fair. Agriculture remains an important element of community culture and economy.

As New York State began to expand its penal system, a group of citizens worked to get a state prison in the town of Attica, as employment opportunities were limited in the rural area. In March 1929, roughly 700 acres (2.8 km^{2}) south of the village were acquired for the prison, and construction began in October. After two years the first inmates were transferred to Attica.

== Geography ==
The village of Attica is located in the northern part of the town of Attica in Wyoming County at 42°51′54″N 78°16′37″W (42.865138, -78.276885). The village limits extend north into the town of Alexander in Genesee County. According to the United States Census Bureau, the village has a total area of 1.7 square miles (4.4 km^{2}), all land.

Tonawanda Creek, a tributary of the Niagara River, flows northward through the center of the village. New York State Route 98 passes through the village along the west side of Tonawanda Creek, leading north 11 miles (18 km) to Batavia and south 27 miles (43 km) to Arcade. New York State Route 238 (Main Street) passes through the center of Attica, leading southeast 13 miles (21 km) to Warsaw and northwest 4 miles (6 km) to U.S. Route 20 in Darien. New York State Route 354 (West Main Street) leads west from Attica 33 miles (53 km) to Buffalo.

=== Climate ===
Attica, New York

Climate chart (precipitation, max. and min. temperature)
J	F	M	A	M	J	J	A	S	O	N	D
2.1 32 17	1.9 35 18	2.3 44 26	3 57 37	3.3 69 47	3.6 78 57	3.4 81 61	3.2 80 60	3.7 73 53	3.2 61 42	2.8 49 33	2.4 37 23
- █ Average max. and min. temperatures in °F
- █ Precipitation totals in inches
- Source: NOWData - NOAA Online Weather Data
Metric conversion
J	F	M	A	M	J	J	A	S	O	N	D
52 0 −8	47 2 −8	58 7 −4	76 14 3	85 20 8	92 25 14	86 27 16	82 26 15	95 23 12	81 16 6	71 9 1	61 3 −5
- █ Average max. and min. temperatures in °C
- █ Precipitation totals in mm

The warmest temperatures in Attica typically occur in July and August. The highest temperature recorded near Attica is 103 °F in July 1936. The lowest ever recorded was −28 °F in February 1934. Snowfall is typically from November through March. The highest recorded snowfall amount is 23 inches in January 1966. In December 2012, the area experienced heavy snowfall as part of the late December 2012 North American storm complex. During this time, approximately 15 to 17 inches of snow was dropped in record time.

== Demographics ==
Historical population
Census	Pop.	Note	%±
1840	800		—
1850	600		−25.0%
1860	1,098		83.0%
1870	1,333		21.4%
1880	1,935		45.2%
1890	1,994		3.0%
1900	1,785		−10.5%
1910	1,869		4.7%
1920	2,015		7.8%
1930	2,212		9.8%
1940	2,379		7.5%
1950	2,676		12.5%
1960	2,758		3.1%
1970	2,911		5.5%
1980	2,659		−8.7%
1990	2,630		−1.1%
2000	2,597		−1.3%
2010	2,547		−1.9%
2020	2,450		−3.8%
U.S. Decennial Census

As of the census of 2000, there were 2,597 people, 1,072 households, and 709 families residing in the village. The population density was 1,542.8 inhabitants per square mile (595.7/km^{2}). There were 1,158 housing units at an average density of 687.9 per square mile (265.6/km^{2}). The racial makeup of the village was 98.81% White, 0.15% African American, 0.35% Native American, 0.15% Asian, 0.12% from other races, and 0.42% from two or more races. Hispanic or Latino of any race were 0.62% of the population.

There were 1,072 households, out of which 33.1% had children under the age of 18 living with them, 49.3% were married couples living together, 13.1% had a female householder with no husband present, and 33.8% were non-families. 29.8% of all households were made up of individuals, and 11.8% had someone living alone who was 65 years of age or older. The average household size was 2.42 and the average family size was 3.00.

In the village, the population was spread out, with 25.8% under the age of 18, 8.9% from 18 to 24, 29.8% from 25 to 44, 21.9% from 45 to 64, and 13.6% who were 65 years of age or older. The median age was 36 years. For every 100 females, there were 95.7 males. For every 100 females age 18 and over, there were 91.8 males.

The median income for a household in the village was $40,234, and the median income for a family was $47,049. Males had a median income of $35,729 versus $22,007 for females. The per capita income for the village was $18,732. About 6.9% of families and 9.9% of the population were below the poverty line, including 15.4% of those under age 18 and 6.9% of those age 65 or over.

== Arts and culture ==
=== Annual cultural events ===
In 1957, the Attica Rodeo and Show Association was formed. Every year a rodeo is held at the grounds in Attica, and it has been voted best rodeo by the American Professional Rodeo Association.

=== Tourism ===
The Exchange Street Historic District, Augustus A. Smith House and U.S. Post Office are listed on the National Register of Historic Places.

== Education ==
The Attica Central School District (ACSD) includes all of the village on the Wyoming County side, and the vast majority of the village on the Genesee County side. The physical campuses of the ACSD include Attica Senior High School, Attica Junior High School, and Prospect Elementary, Sheldon Elementary is no longer in use. The Genesee County side of Attica Village extends into Alexander Central School District.

Higher education in the area is available at Genesee Community College, with its main campus located just north of Attica in nearby Batavia. Additional colleges and universities nearby include Monroe Community College, State University of New York at Brockport, University at Buffalo, and University of Rochester.

== State institutions ==
Attica Correctional Facility and Wyoming Correctional Facility are located south of the village in the Town of Attica.

== Notable people ==
- Parmenio Adams (1776–1832), U.S. congressman from New York, lived here
- Charles B. Benedict (1828–1901), congressman from New York, lived here
- George Gilbert Hoskins (1824–1893), congressman from New York and lieutenant governor of New York, lived here
- Harold C. Ostertag (1896–1985), congressman from New York, born here
- James O. Putnam (1793–1855), U.S. congressman from New York and New York state senator, lived here
- James Edward Quigley (1854–1915), Bishop of Buffalo and Archbishop of Chicago, lived here
- Leo Richard Smith (1905–1963), Bishop of Ogdensburg, born here
- Frederick C. Stevens (1856–1916), New York state senator, born here
- Robert S. Stevens (1824–1893), congressman from New York, born here
