= Perry, New York =

Perry
- Town
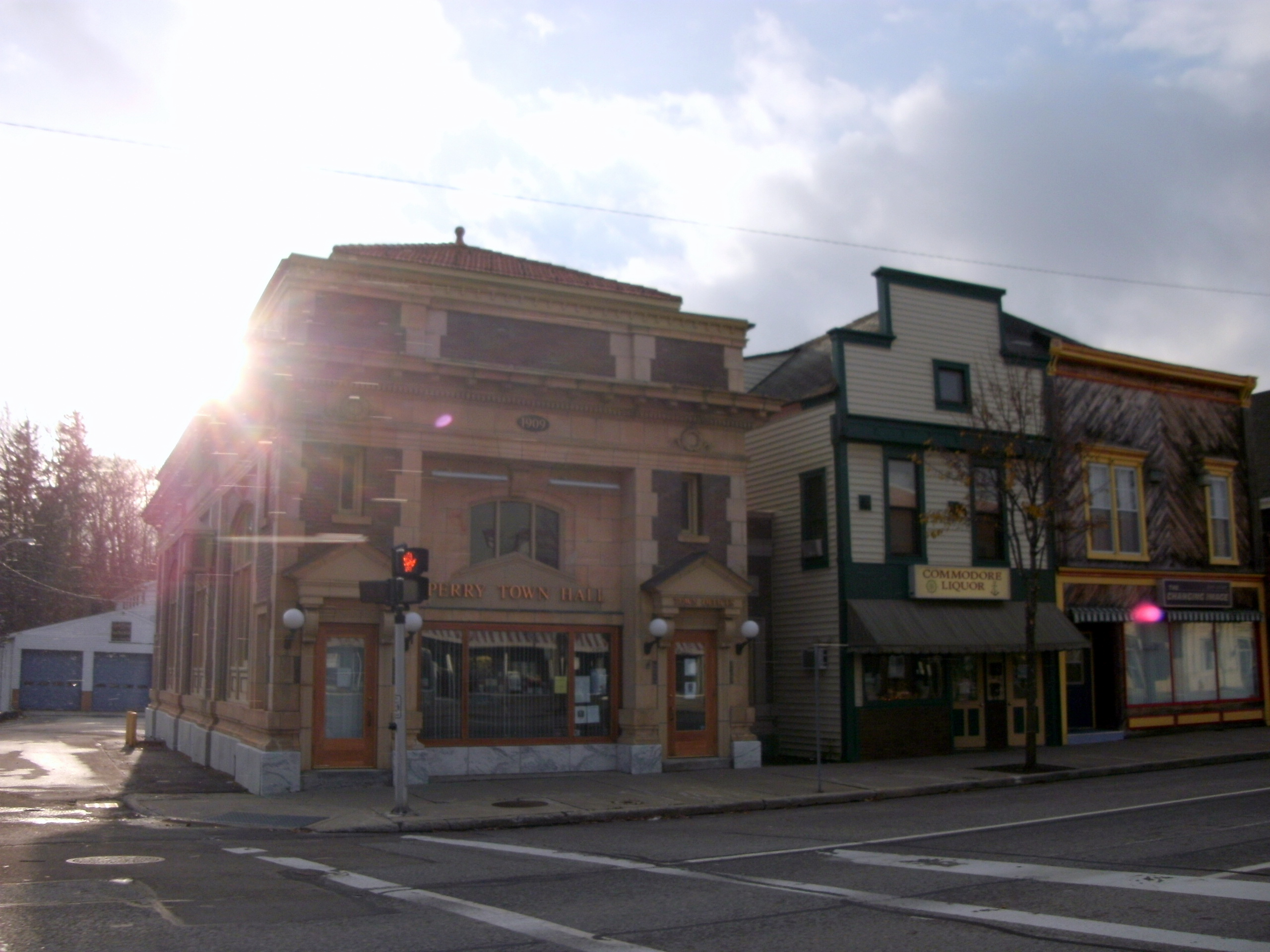
- Town hall

- Location within Wyoming County and New York

- Location within the state of New York
- Coordinates: 42°42′57″N 78°0′19″W
- Country: USA
- State: New York
- County: Wyoming County

Area
  - Total: 36.65 sq mi (94.92 km^{2})
  - Land: 36.41 sq mi (94.29 km^{2})
  - Water: 0.24 sq mi (0.63 km^{2})
- Elevation: 1,440 ft (440 m)

Population (2010)
  - Total: 4,616
  - Estimate (2016): 4,402
  - Density: 120.9/sq mi (46.69/km^{2})
- Time zone: UTC-5 (Eastern (EST))
  - Summer (DST): UTC-4 (EDT)
- ZIP code: 14530
- FIPS code: 36-57254
- GNIS feature ID: 0979354
- Website: www.townofperry.com

Perry is a town in Wyoming County, New York, United States. The population was 5,813 at the 2020 census. The town is named after Commodore Oliver Hazard Perry.

The town is on the eastern border of the county. Perry is also the name of a village within the town. The town is styled "home of the Silver Lake Sea Serpent" after a sea serpent sighting, possibly a hoax, in 1855. The serpent is celebrated by images throughout the town and previously by a summer festival. An artificial serpent was placed by Silver Lake in 2016.

The Village of Perry joined Tree City USA in 2017.

U.S. Route 20A passes across the town.

== History ==
The Town of Perry was established in 1814 from part of the Town of Leicester (now in Livingston County). It was coincidentally formed at the same time as another town of Perry in Cattaraugus County; that town changed its name to Perrysburgh in 1818 after being split up. Parts of the town of Perry were removed later to form new towns.

Chester A. Arthur, the twenty-first President of the United States spent some of his childhood years in the Village of Perry after being born in Fairfield, Vermont. Irving C. Tomlinson, a Universalist minister who became a prominent Christian Scientist, was born in Perry in 1860.

Edward Austin Sheldon was born and grew up in the hamlet of Perry Center, in what was then Genesee County and later became Wyoming County. Sheldon founded the Oswego Training School, now the State University of New York at Oswego.

Landscape artist Lemuel M. Wiles was from Perry and had an art school at Silver Lake. A gallery devoted to his work was donated to Perry Public Library and his work, including some local scenes, can be seen there. His son Irving Ramsey Wiles was a noted portrait artist.

== Demographics ==
Historical population
Census	Pop.	Note	%±
1820	2,317		—
1830	3,831		65.3%
1840	3,082		−19.6%
1850	2,832		−8.1%
1860	2,452		−13.4%
1870	2,342		−4.5%
1880	2,571		9.8%
1890	2,928		13.9%
1900	3,862		31.9%
1910	5,360		38.8%
1920	5,400		0.7%
1930	5,086		−5.8%
1940	5,251		3.2%
1950	5,342		1.7%
1960	5,372		0.6%
1970	5,367		−0.1%
1980	5,437		1.3%
1990	5,353		−1.5%
2000	4,876		−8.9%
2010	4,616		−5.3%
2020	5,832		26.3%
2022 (est.)	5,813	▼	−0.3%
U.S. Decennial Census

As of the census of 2010, there were 4,616 people, 1,872 households, and 1,242 families residing in the town. There were 2,190 housing units at an average density of 57.3 per square mile (22.1/km^{2}). The racial makeup of the town was 96.2% White, 0.5% Black or African American, 0.3% Native American, 0.3% Asian, 1.3% from other races, and 1.4% from two or more races. Hispanic or Latino of any race were 3.3% of the population.

There were 1,872 households, out of which 27.9% had children under the age of 18 living with them, 4.81% were married couples living together, 12.0% had a female householder with no husband present, and 33.7% were non-families. 26.5% of all households were made up of individuals, and 11.1% had someone living alone who was 65 years of age or older. The average household size was 2.45 and the average family size was 2.93.

In the town, the population was spread out, with 23.5% under the age of 18, and 14.8% who were 65 years of age or older. The median age was 39.4 years. For every 100 females, there were 94.8 males. For every 100 females age 18 and over, there were 106.2 males.

According to the 2010-2014 American Community Survey 5-Year Estimates, the median income for a household in the town was $51,194, and the median income for a family was $62,625. Males had a median income of $39,151 versus $34,639 for females. The per capita income for the town was $24,726. About 11.7% of families and 14.9% of the population were below the poverty line, including 21.5% of those under age 18 and 8.1% of those age 65 or over.

== Geography ==
According to the United States Census Bureau, the town has a total area of 36.6 square miles (94.8 km^{2}), of which 36.4 square miles (94.2 km^{2}) is land and 0.2 square mile (0.6 km^{2}) (0.60%) is water.

The east town line is the border of Livingston County.

Routes 20A, 39, and 246 pass through the town. New York State Route 39 is the village's Main Street.

== Community Events ==
- New York State Puppet Festival, June 2018

== Communities and locations in the Town of Perry ==
- Buffalo Corners – A location on Route 246 north of Perry Center.
- Burke Hill – A location west of Buffalo Corners.
- Perry – The Village of Perry in on the south town line.
- Perry Center – A hamlet at the intersection of Routes 20A and 246.
- Perry-Warsaw Municipal Airport (01G) – A general aviation airport northwest of Perry village.
- Silver Lake – The north end of the lake is southwest of Perry village.
- Simmons Corners – A location east of Perry Center on Route 20A.
- Sucker Brook – A hamlet west of Perry Center on Route 20A.
- West Perry Center – A hamlet on the western town line on Route 20A.

== See also ==
- List of towns in New York
