= Exchange Street Historic District (Attica, New York) =

Historic district in New York, United States

- U.S. National Register of Historic Places
- U.S. Historic district
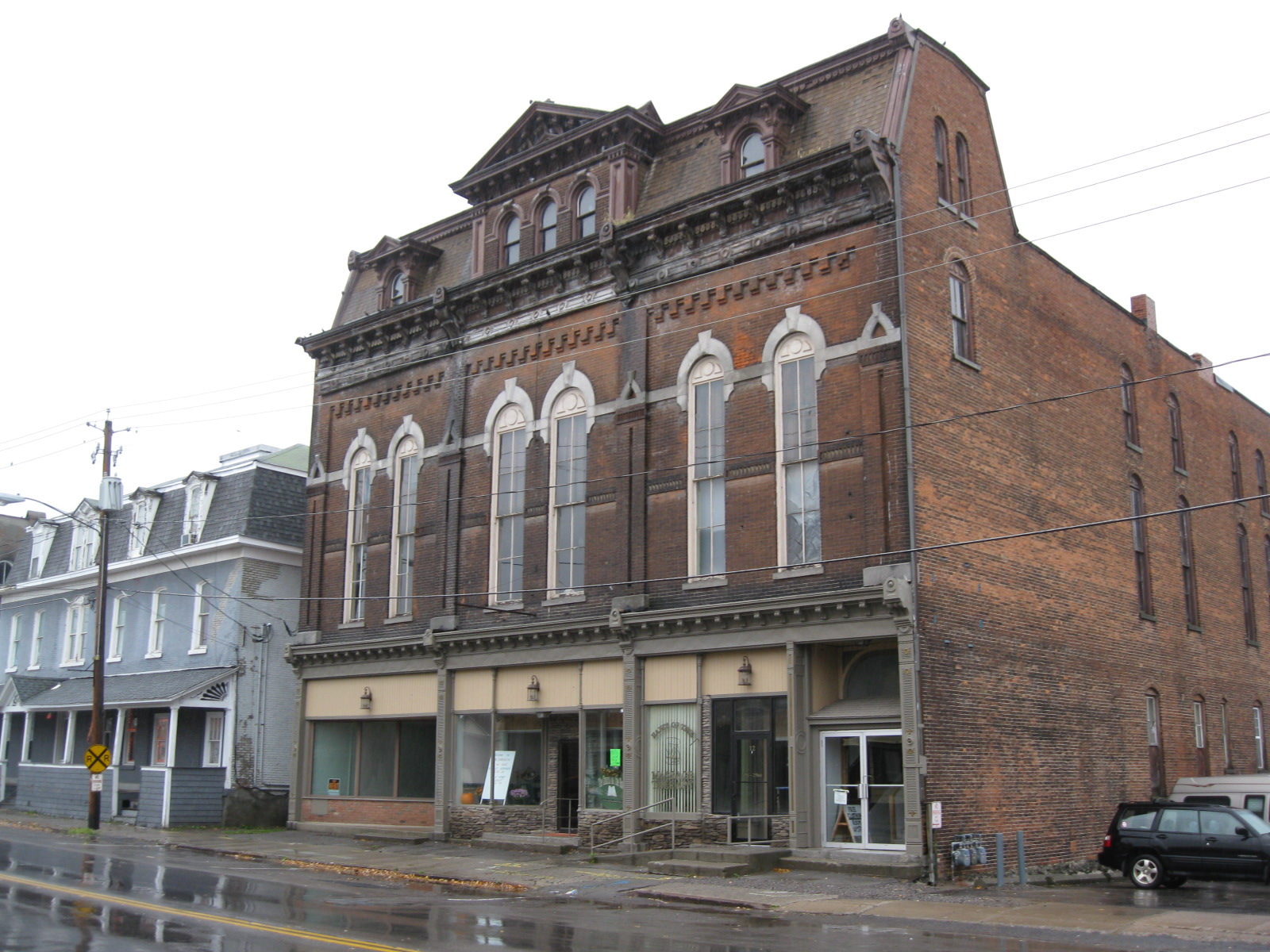
- Williams Opera House, Exchange Street Historic District, October 2009

- Location within New York Location within the United States
- Location: 15-48 Exchange St. & Erie RR Depot, Attica, New York
- Coordinates: 42°51′48″N 78°16′50″W
- Area: 5.07 acres (2.05 ha)
- Architectural style: Mixed
- NRHP reference No.: 12000962
- Added to NRHP: November 21, 2012

Exchange Street Historic District is a national historic district located at Attica in Wyoming County, New York. The district encompasses 12 contributing buildings along two blocks in the village of Attica. They are two- and three-story, brick and frame commercial buildings built after the fire of 1877. The buildings provided service and hospitality for rail passengers and for cultural and social events for Attica's citizens. They include the Williams Opera House (1879), Wyoming House (1878), Hotel Liberty or Attica Hotel (c. 1880), The Railroad Store (c. 1885), Erie House (1880), Spann Block (1874), Western Hotel (1832), and Erie Depot (1879).

It was listed on the National Register of Historic Places in 2012.

== Gallery ==
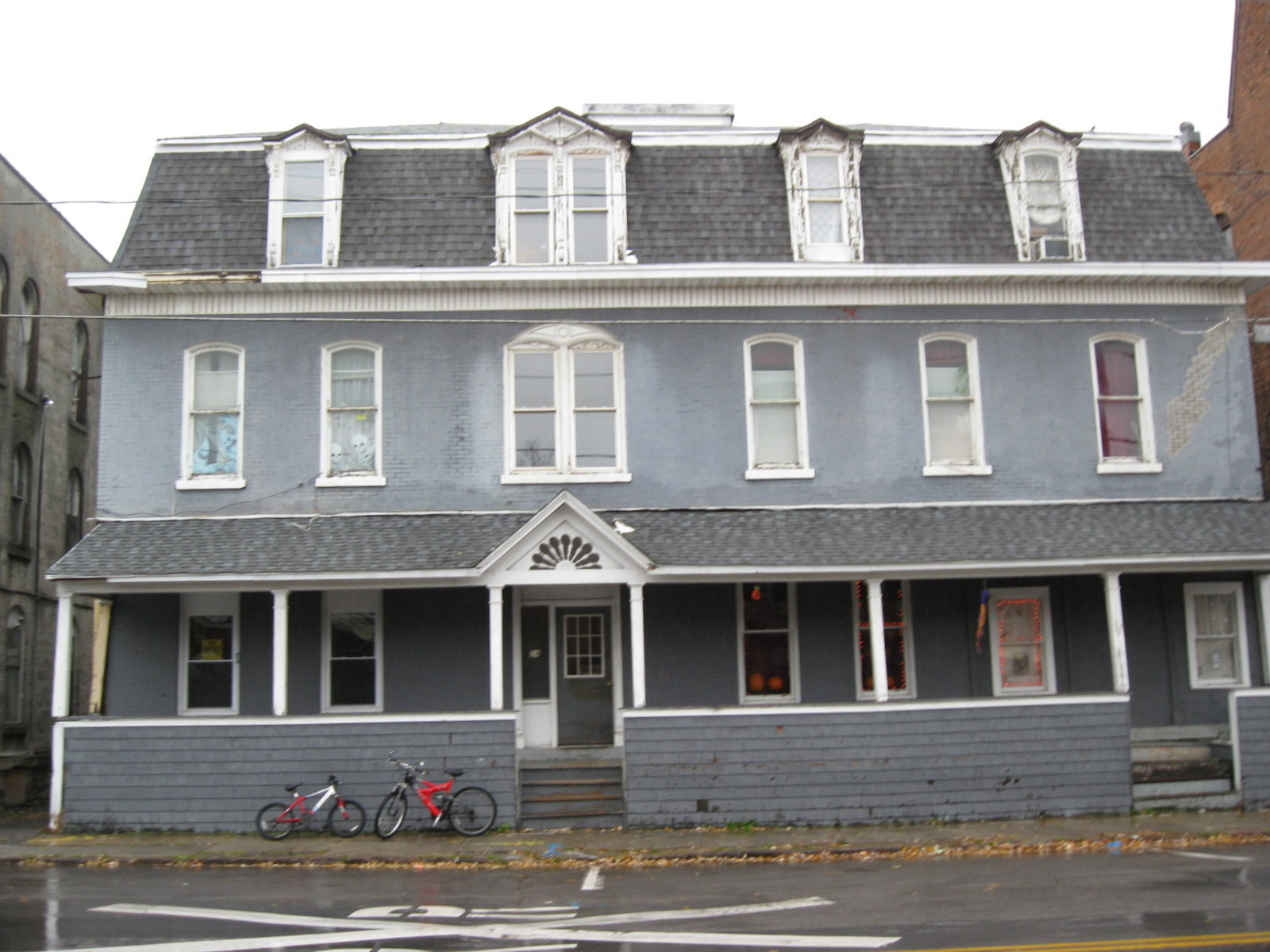
Wyoming House, Exchange Street Historic District, October 2009

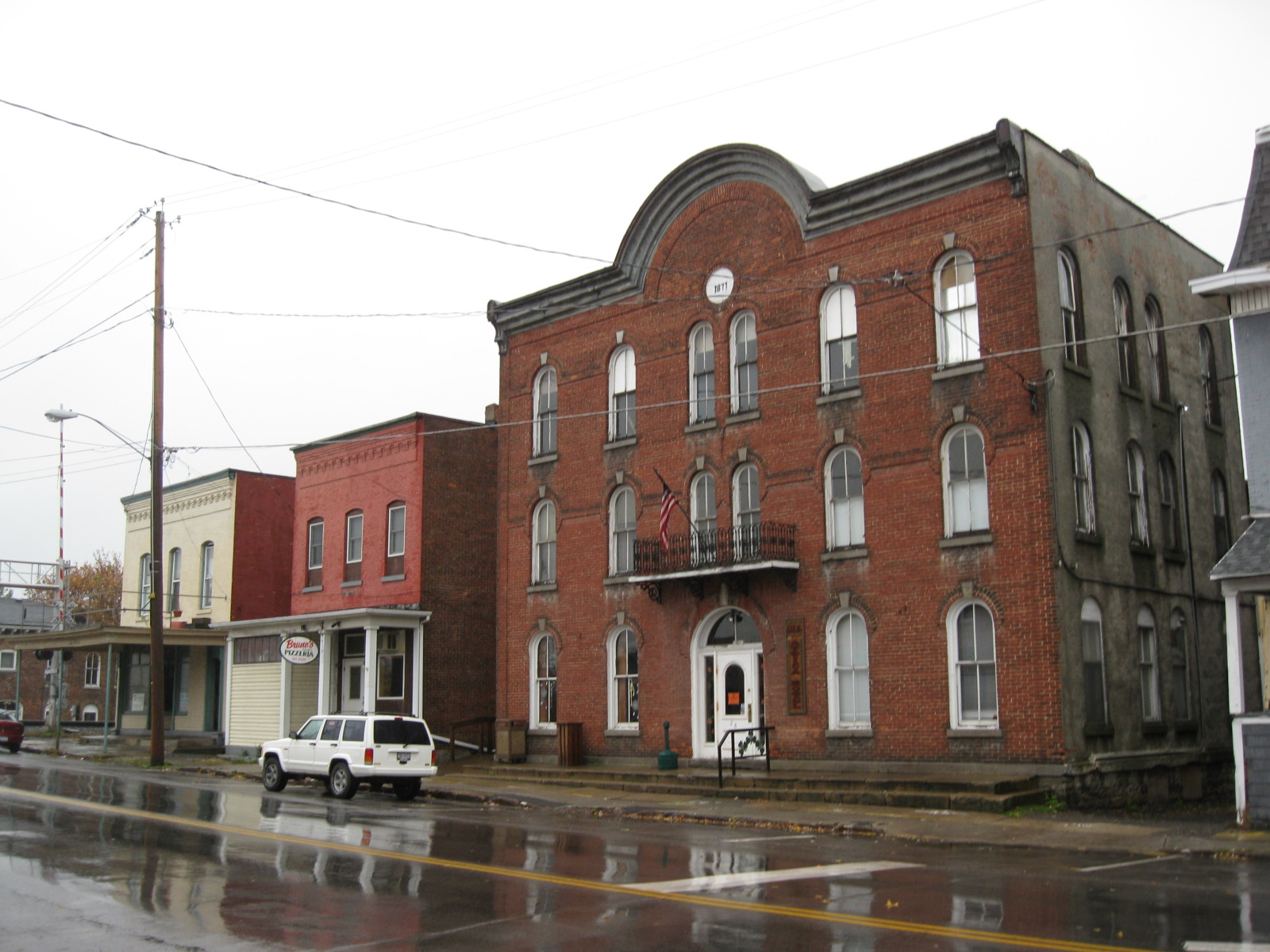
Hotel Liberty or Attica Hotel (at right), Exchange Street Historic District, October 2009

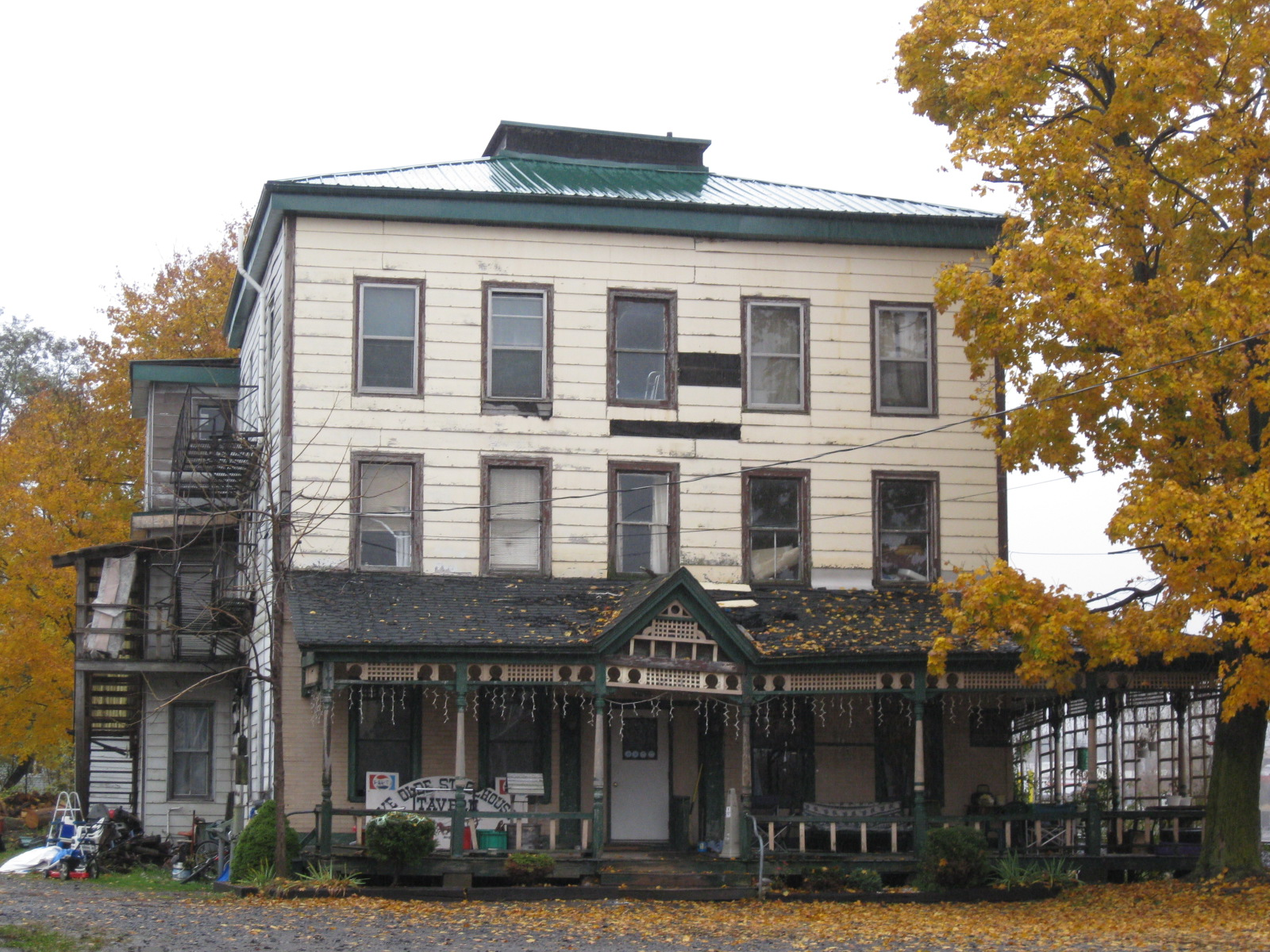
Western Hotel, Exchange Street Historic District, October 2009
