= Silver Lake, Wyoming County, New York =

Lake in Wyoming County, New York, United States

Silver Lake
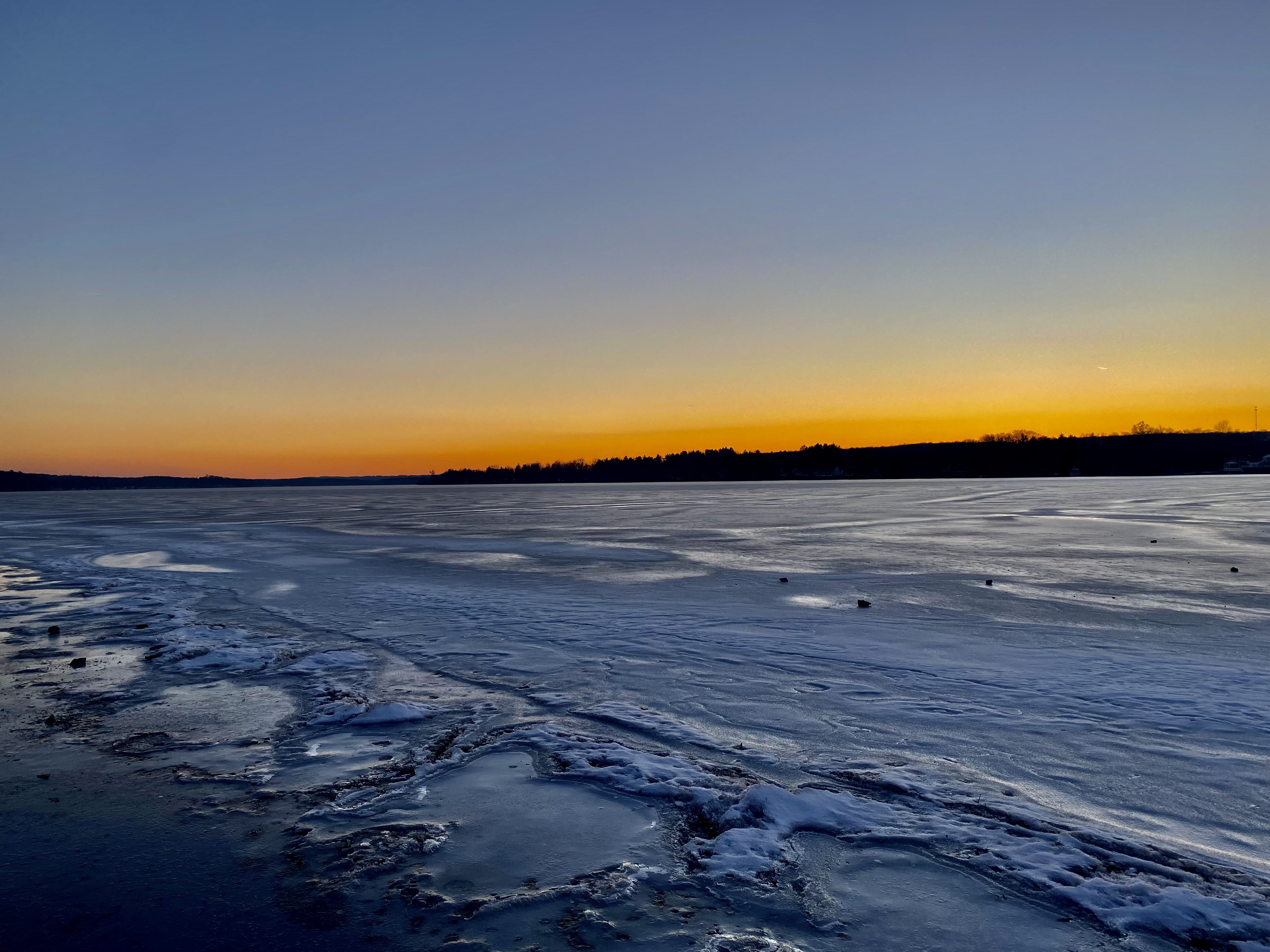
- Silver Lake viewed on a February evening

- Location within New York Location within the United States
- Location: Wyoming County, New York, United States
- Coordinates: 42°41′40″N 78°1′59″W
- Primary inflows: Silver Lake Inlet
- Primary outflows: Silver Lake Outlet
- Basin countries: United States
- Max. length: 3.7 kilometres (2.3 mi)
- Max. width: 1 kilometre (0.62 mi)
- Surface area: 836 acres (3.38 km^{2})
- Average depth: 17 feet (5.2 m)
- Max. depth: 37 feet (11 m)
- Shore length^{1}: 7.4 miles (11.9 km)
- Surface elevation: 1,352 feet (412 m)
- Settlements: Perry, New York
- ^{1} Shore length is not a well-defined measure.

Silver Lake is a lake in Wyoming County, New York, United States. It is located on New York State Route 39 . It extends from the village of Perry south to Silver Lake State Park near Silver Springs. Silver Lake's main attractions include its scenery, fishing and boating, and its location near Letchworth State Park.

Like the nearby Finger Lakes of Conesus, Hemlock, and Honeoye, Silver Lake is in the Genesee River Watershed, which ultimately drains into Lake Ontario. Other lakes in the region include Waneta and Lamoka lakes.

Fish species present in the lake are black bullhead, northern pike, largemouth bass, bluegill, pumpkinseed sunfish, yellow perch, black crappie, rock bass, and walleye. There is state owned public access with hard surface ramp on the southwest shore at Silver Lake State Park.

== History ==
Silver Lake was the focus of a legend surrounding a sea serpent that was reportedly seen in the nearby lake in the mid-19th century. According to an affidavit sworn by four men who were out fishing on July 13, 1855, it was a 60-foot-long (18 m) serpent with glowing, red eyes. The resulting frenzy that came from this story created an immense boom for the nearby town of Perry and Silver Lake. After this incident, about 100 other people claimed to see the giant beast. This phenomenon lasted throughout the summer and was last seen towards the end of the season. Despite the lack of appearance, it remained one of the most popular places in America.

One of the main beneficiaries of the sea serpent was A. B. Walker, the owner of the Walker Hotel in Silver Lake. When the Hotel burned down in 1857, firemen discovered the remains of the legend: a large mass of canvas. He had constructed the entire monster in order to attract business to the lake. It was said he got the idea from a Native American legend.
