= I. Sam Johnson =

American politician

Isaac Samuel Johnson (October 28, 1840 – September 25, 1906) was an American lawyer and politician from New York.

== Life ==
Johnson was born on October 28, 1840, in Centerfield, New York, the son of Hiram Johnson and Jane Slade.

Johnson moved to Cattaraugus County in 1843. He later moved to Warsaw. He attended the Warsaw Academy and the Genesee Wesleyan Seminary. He spent six months studying law under General L. W. Thayer. He then studied under Judges Comstock and Healy until August 1862.

In August 1862, during the American Civil War, Johnson was enrolled in the 136th New York Infantry Regiment. In September 1862, he was mustered in as first sergeant of Company D. In March 1863, he was promoted to first lieutenant. In January 1864, he was discharged for disability.

In May 1864, Johnson was admitted to the state bar. He initially practiced law with M. E. Bartlett in Warsaw. In 1866, he moved to Arcade. In 1870, he became a member of the law firm Johnson & McKnight. In 1876, he returned to Warsaw. In 1877, he formed a copartnership with S. B. Bartlett called Johnson & Bartlett. After Bartlett moved to Minnesota in 1881, Johnson formed a law partnership with H. E. Dean. In 1885, he formed the law firm Johnson & Charles with Elmer E. Charles.

In 1876, Johnson was elected District Attorney of Wyoming County, an office he was re-elected twice to and served in for nine years. He also served as president of the village of Arcade and trustee of the village of Warsaw. In 1889, he was elected to the New York State Assembly as a Republican, representing Wyoming County. He served in the Assembly in 1890 and 1891. He was also a delegate to the 1894 New York State Constitutional Convention.

Johnson was a member of the Freemasons, the Royal Arch Masonry, the Knights Templar, the Shriners, the Odd Fellows, and the Knights of Pythias. He was also a commander of his Grand Army of the Republic post. In 1865, he married Mary McFarland of Twinsburg, Ohio. They had no children.

Johnson died at home on September 25, 1906. He was buried in the Warsaw Cemetery.

New York State Assembly
Preceded by Greenleaf S. Van Gorder	New York State Assembly; Wyoming County; 1890–1891	Succeeded by Milo H. Olin
