= Warsaw Downtown Historic District =

Historic district in New York, United States

- U.S. National Register of Historic Places
- U.S. Historic district
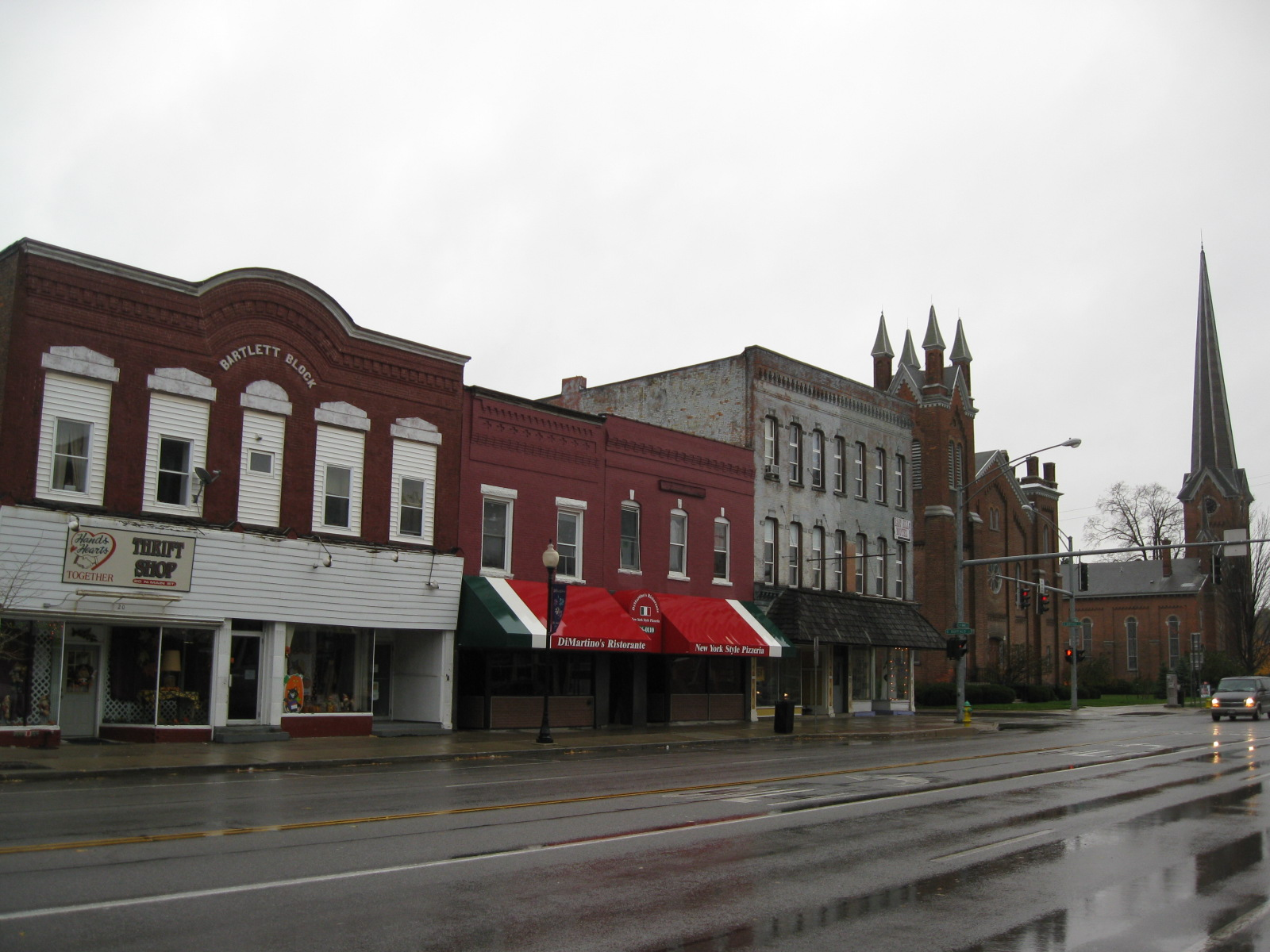
- East Side of North Main St., Warsaw Downtown Historic District, October 2009

- Location within New York Location within the United States
- Location: N. & S. Main between Frank & Brooklyn Sts., Warsaw, New York
- Coordinates: 42°44′22″N 78°07′57″W
- Architectural style: Mixed
- NRHP reference No.: 12000963
- Added to NRHP: November 21, 2012

Warsaw Downtown Historic District is a national historic district located at Warsaw in Wyoming County, New York. The district encompasses 36 contributing buildings in the village of Warsaw. They are a variety of commercial, institutional, and religious buildings with most built between the 1870s and 1915. A number of commercial buildings were constructed after the fires of 1867 and 1887. They include the Andrew Jackson Warner designed United Church of Warsaw (1860s), First Baptist Church (1889), Bartlett Block (c. 1866, c. 1890), Hostetter's Pharmacy (c. 1888), New Watkin's Hotel (c. 1888) Sullivan Building (1915), Wyoming County Bank (c. 1905), Glover's Department Store (c. 1916), Gardner's Grocery (c. 1860-1870), Pratt Grocery (c. 1870), Farman-Humphrey Block (1884), Lincoln Block (c. 1894-1900), and Schwab's Motor Sales (c. 1940). Located in the district and separately listed are the Warsaw Academy and United States Post Office.

It was listed on the National Register of Historic Places in 2012.

== Gallery ==
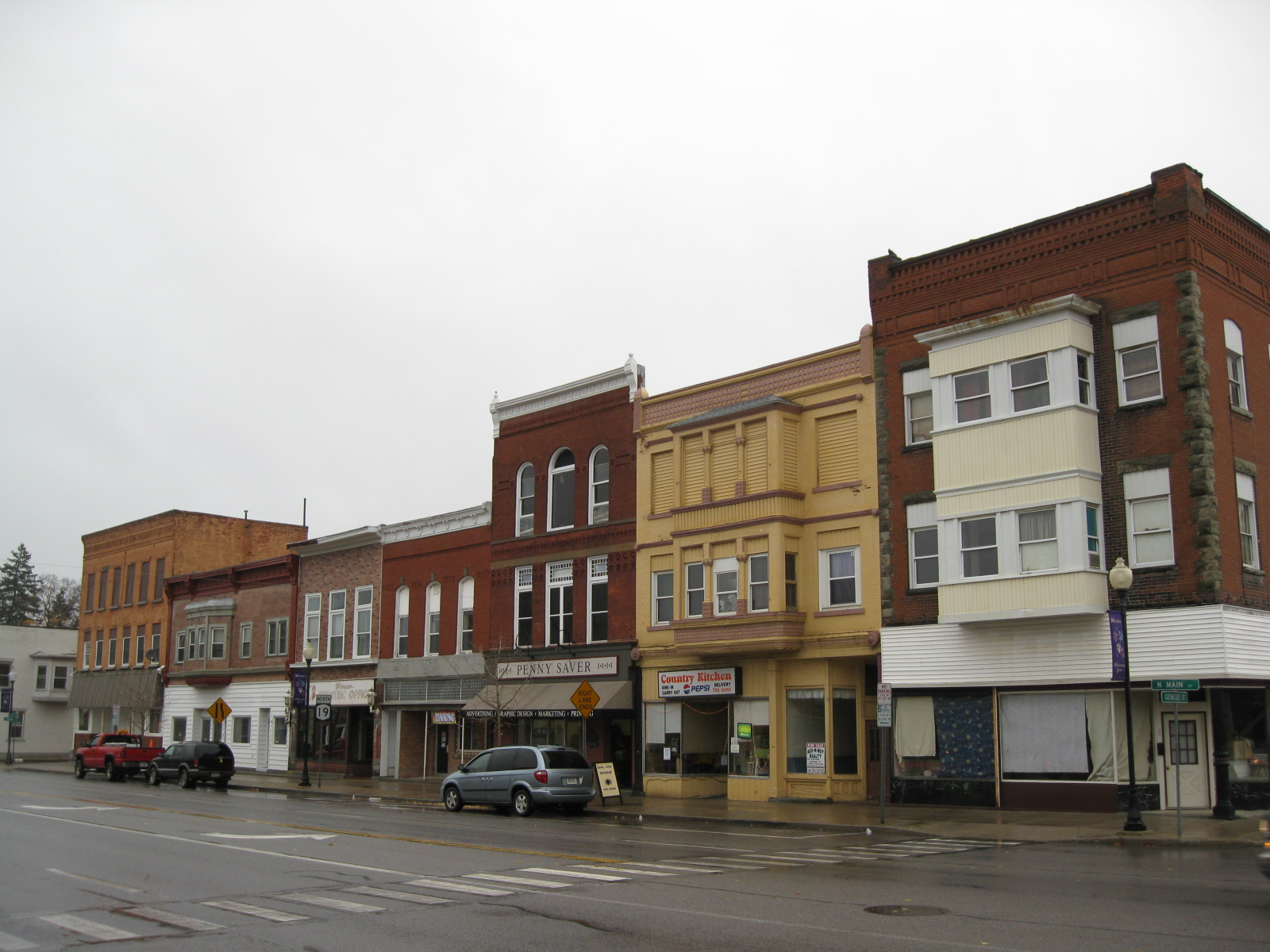
East Side of North Main St., Warsaw Downtown Historic District, October 2009

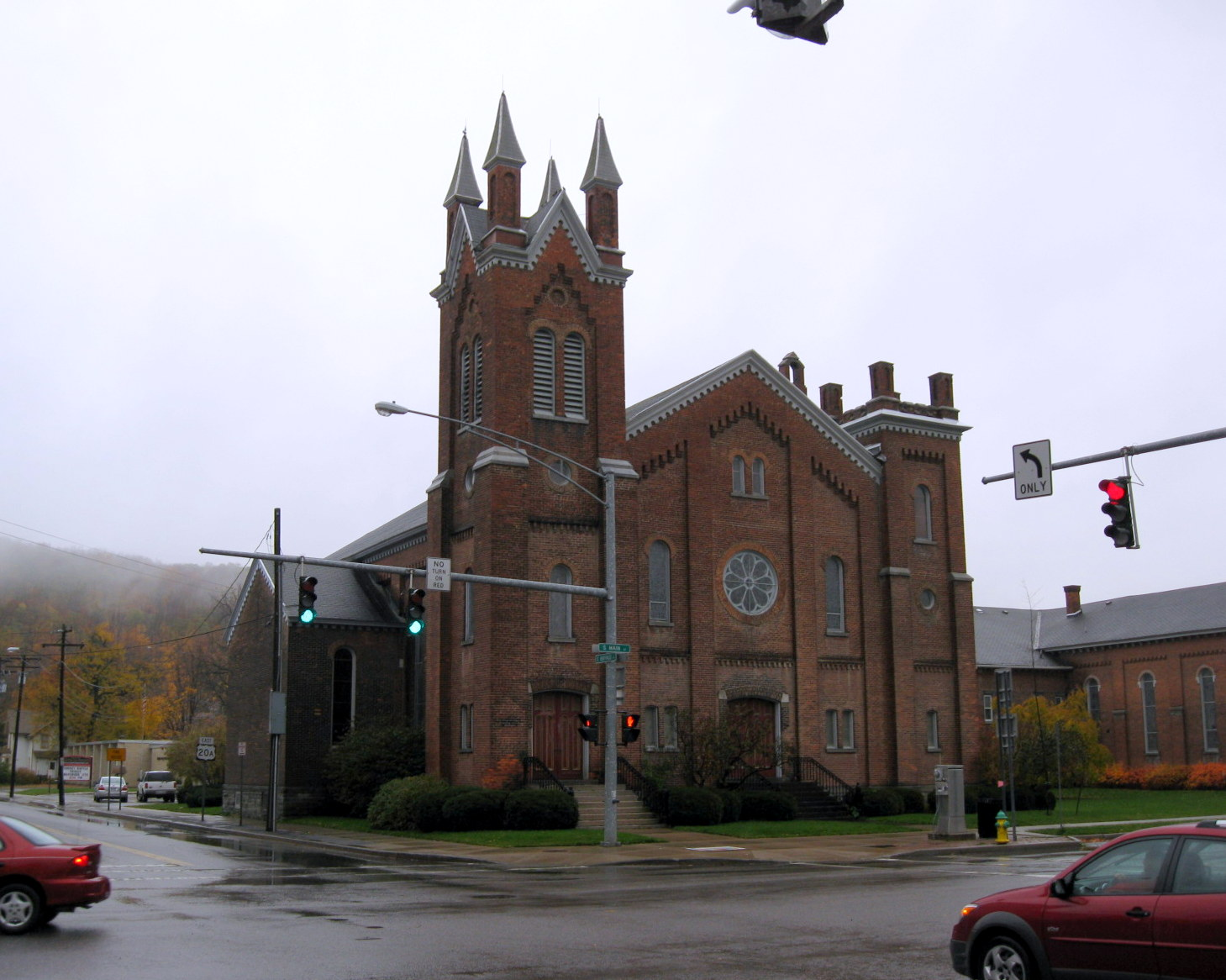
United Church of Warsaw, Warsaw Downtown Historic District, October 2009

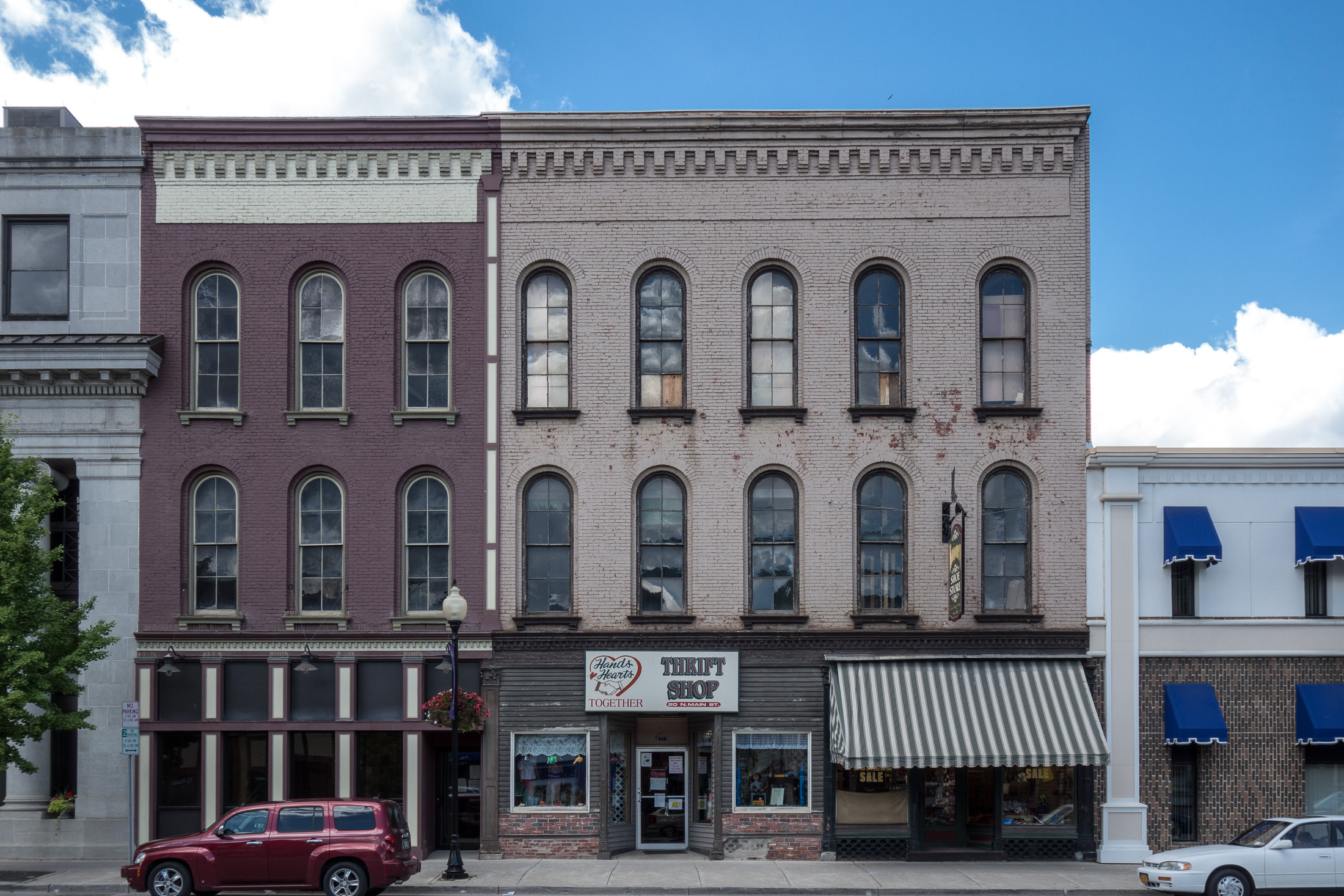

== See also ==
- National Register of Historic Places listings in Wyoming County, New York
