= Senator Humphrey =

Senator Humphrey may refer to:

== Members of the United States Senate ==
- Gordon J. Humphrey (born 1940), U.S. Senator from New Hampshire from 1979 to 1990
- Hubert Humphrey (1911–1978), U.S. Senator from Minnesota from 1971 to 1978

== United States state senate members ==
- Friend Humphrey (1787–1854), New York State Senate
- Herman L. Humphrey (1830–1902), Wisconsin State Senate
- James M. Humphrey (1819–1899), New York State Senate
- John Humphrey (Illinois politician) (1838–1914), Illinois State Senate
- Lester H. Humphrey (1850–1902), New York State Senate
- Lyman U. Humphrey (1844–1915), Kansas State Senate
- Ralph L. Humphrey (1908–1961), Ohio State Senate
- Reuben Humphrey (1757–1832), New York State Senate
- Skip Humphrey (born 1942), Minnesota State Senate
- Wolcott J. Humphrey (1817–1890), New York State Senate

== See also ==
- Senator Humphreys (disambiguation)
