= WCJW =

Radio station in Warsaw, New York

Coordinates: 42°43′34″N 78°06′43″W

- Warsaw, New York; United States
- Broadcast area: Western New York
- Frequency: 1140 kHz
- Branding: WNY's CJ Country

Programming
- Format: Classic Country
- Affiliations: Fox News Radio; Motor Racing Network; Performance Racing Network

Ownership
- Owner: WCJW LLC
- Sister stations: WVIN-FM

History
- First air date: May 16, 1973
- Call sign meaning: Station founders Catherine and John Weeks

Technical information
- Licensing authority: FCC
- Facility ID: 37858
- Class: D
- Power: 8,000 watts (days only); 2,300 watts (critical hours)
- Translator: See below

Links
- Public license information: Public file; LMS
- Website: wcjw.com

WCJW (1140 kHz) is a commercial AM radio station licensed to Warsaw, New York and serving Western New York. It is owned by WCJW LLC, and calls itself "CJ Country." The radio studios and transmitter are on Merchant Road in Warsaw.

WCJW broadcasts at 8,000 watts during daytime hours using a directional antenna with a two-tower array. During critical hours, the power is reduced to 2,300 watts.

It is required by the FCC to sign off at sunset, though effectively the AM station now merely serves as a de facto relay to a network of six co-owned FM translators to provide full-time service, which are all promoted over the AM signal, which is only mentioned during the hourly station identification.

== Programmning ==
The station's format is centered on country music, using the positioning statement "Today's Favorites and the Legends", playing classic country hits with more recent releases included in the playlist. WCJW also airs local news, weather, high school sports, and agriculture reports. Other popular features include WCJW's daily Tradio program and weekend coverage of NASCAR races. National news service is provided by Fox News Radio.

In contrast to many small-market radio stations, WCJW maintains a local programming staff. Weekend shows heard on WCJW include Retro Country USA and Rise Up Country.

== Coverage area ==
WCJW is the only AM station in Wyoming County and the only broadcast station in the county with a local studio (WLKK is licensed to Wethersfield in Wyoming County, but has its main studios in the Buffalo suburb of Amherst).

In addition to the county seat of Warsaw, targeted communities include Perry, Silver Springs, Castile, Gainesville, Arcade, and Attica, along with the Livingston County villages of Geneseo, Mount Morris, Nunda, Avon and Caledonia, and the Genesee County municipalities of Batavia and Le Roy.

== Translators ==
In June 2008, WCJW began simulcasting its programming on FM translator W279BO in Warsaw, a 250-watt facility collocated with the studio and AM transmitter. In November 2008, W288BZ began operating on 105.5 MHz from the Genesee County public safety tower in Batavia. In January 2009, W265BX began serving southern Wyoming County and Livingston County from the hilltop east of Nunda, and in November 2011, WCJW's fourth translator W282BQ commenced service to Le Roy, northern Livingston County, and southwestern Monroe County, including the Interstate 390 corridor from Mount Morris to Henrietta. In April 2015, W285EZ began operation at the WLKK tower site in Wethersfield, employing a directional pattern that serves Arcade, Yorkshire, Delevan and Bliss. All six translators transmit in stereo and employ the Radio Data System.

Broadcast translators for WCJW
Call sign	Frequency	City of license	FID	ERP (W)	Class	FCC info
W265DQ	100.9 FM	Alden, New York	200641	230	D	LMS
W285EZ	104.9 FM	Arcade, New York	151698	250	D	LMS
W282BQ	104.3 FM	Avon, New York	156153	110	D	LMS
W288BZ	105.5 FM	Batavia, New York	151763	250	D	LMS
W265BX	100.9 FM	Geneseo, New York	148909	250	D	LMS
W279BO	103.7 FM	Warsaw, New York	151653	250	D	LMS
W262CX	100.3 FM	Bath, New York		250	D	

== History ==
WCJW began its test broadcasts on May 16, 1973, officially broadcasting on May 21. It was a daytimer under the ownership of broadcast engineer John Weeks, who had spent much of his career on the engineering staff of WJR in Detroit. Weeks envisioned a family-oriented operation, with his wife Catherine and daughters Carolyn and Jill filling early staff positions at the station. WCJW's original music format took an easy listening / MOR approach, later dubbed "The Heart of Western New York".

Upon Weeks' retirement in September 1984, the station was purchased by Warsaw resident Lloyd Lane and a group of local investors. A format change to country music in 1986 brought increased support from listeners in this rural region of upstate New York with a local economy based primarily on dairy farming. In 1996, The station was awarded a New York State Broadcasters Association award for best small market play-by-play for high school football by Seth Fenton and Tom LaDelfa. At the time, due to its daytime only status, WCJW pre-recorded Friday night games to air on Saturday morning, and broadcast live daylight games in the afternoon. In 1999, the station's nominal power was raised to 2,500 watts, and in 2014 the power was increased again to 8,000 watts.

Prior to adding the FM translators in 2008, WCJW was a daytime-only station. The AM station remains on the air only during the daytime, as it occupies a clear channel and must vacate the channel at night to allow WRVA in Richmond, Virginia to use the frequency.

As part of a longstanding legal fiction, WCJW officially "shared" its studios with WLKK in Wethersfield. In reality WLKK never used WCJW's studios, which were leased by Buffalo-based broadcasters to comply with the FCC's main studio rule, which has since been rescinded.

In September 2025, longtime station owner Lloyd Lane sold WCJW to Tom and Desire (sic) Hoyt. The Hoyts maintained the station's format and introduced a full-power FM simulcast on WVIN-FM in Bath.

In an interesting historical footnote, the call letters WCJW had previously been assigned to an FM station in Cleveland, OH on the frequency of 104.1 from 1968 to 1971. That station had also switched to a country music format during the use of these call letters. In 1971 the station was sold and became WQAL.

== Awards ==
In 2007, WCJW was recognized by New Music Weekly magazine as the Country Radio Station of the Year at the New Music Awards. In 2019, 2020, 2022 & 2023 Program Director Jimi Jamm was nominated for Small Market Music Director of the Year by Country Aircheck, a country radio trade publication. In 2021, Jamm won the Randy Jones Memorial Award, which is given for charitable work in the community and for the promotion and preservation of country music through the station.\
