= Elmer E. Charles =

American politician

Elmer E. Charles (January 3, 1862 – October 31, 1936) was an American lawyer and politician from New York.

== Life ==
Charles was born on January 3, 1862, in Wethersfield, New York, the son of farmer William Henry Charles and Lurana Witherell. His great-great-grandfather was Harvard University President Samuel Langdon.

After attending the district schools and Warsaw high school, Charles began studying law. He was admitted to the bar in 1884. He initially practiced law in Arcade for a year. In 1885, he moved to Warsaw. In 1886, he formed a partnership with I. Sam Johnson. He served as District Attorney of Wyoming County from 1895 to 1903. He was a member of the Warsaw School Board from 1904 to 1913, serving as its president for most of that time. He practiced law alone from 1906 to 1924, when he formed a partnership with his son Glenn E. called E. E. & G. E. Charles.

In 1903, Charles was elected to the New York State Assembly as a Republican, representing Wyoming County. He served in the Assembly in 1904 and 1905.

Charles was a member of the Wyoming County Bar Association, the New York State Bar Association, the American Bar Association, the Freemasons, the Royal Arch Masonry, and the Odd Fellows. He attended the First Congregational Church of Warsaw. In 1892, he married Sadie G. Baird of Narrowsburg. Their children were Glenn E., Delphine K., and Barbara B. His son Glenn was also District Attorney of Wyoming County.

Charles died at home on October 31, 1936. He was buried in Warsaw Cemetery.

New York State Assembly
Preceded by Henry J. McNair	New York State Assembly; Wyoming County; 1904–1905	Succeeded by Byron A. Nevins
