= Frederick C. Stevens =

Frederick C. Stevens may refer to:

- Frederick Stevens (American politician) (Frederick Clement Stevens, 1861–1923), US congressman from Minnesota
- Frederick C. Stevens (New York politician) (Frederick Charles Stevens, 1856–1916), New York politician
