= Lester H. Humphrey =

American politician

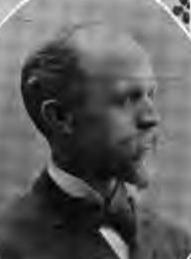
- Humphrey (1897)
- Born: January 22, 1850; Sheldon, New York, U.S.
- Died: March 17, 1902 (aged 52); Albany, New York, U.S.
- Resting place: Warsaw Town Cemetery; Warsaw, New York
- Education: Warsaw Academy
- Political party: Republican Party
- Spouse: Maude Wilton Skinner
- Children: Harry C. Humphrey; Onias S. Humphrey; Mary E. Humphrey
- Parent(s): Lester Hayden Humphrey; Hannah (Blakeley) Humphrey
- Relatives: Wolcott J. Humphrey; Onias C. Skinner

Lester Hayden Humphrey (January 22, 1850 – March 17, 1902) was an American manufacturer, banker and politician. He served as a member of the New York State Senate.

== Early life ==
Humphrey was born on January 22, 1850, in Sheldon, Wyoming County, New York, the son of Lester Hayden Humphrey (1799–1884) and Hannah (Blakeley) Humphrey (1807-1902). He moved with his family to Warsaw, New York in 1865. He attended the common schools, and Arcade and Warsaw academies.

== Career ==
He engaged in the tanning and leather trade until 1872, and was Vice President of the Wyoming County National Bank from 1873-1888. In 1885, he began the manufacture of salt in Warsaw, and in 1888 co-established a salt plant at Hutchinson, Kansas. In 1890, he sold out his interest in the Hutchinson plant and succeeded his uncle Wolcott J. Humphrey as President of the Wyoming County National Bank. He also continued to engage in the manufacture of salt in Pavilion and Ithaca.

Humphrey was a delegate to the 1888 Republican National Convention, and a member of the New York State Senate (46th District) from 1896 until his death in 1902, sitting in the 119th, 120th, 121st, 122nd, 123rd, 124th and 125th New York State Legislatures. While in the State Senate, he served as Chairman of the Committee of Banks, and worked on reforming bank taxation laws.

He died during the legislative session, on March 17, 1902, at his lodgings in Albany, of pneumonia; and was buried at the Warsaw Town Cemetery in Warsaw, New York.

== Family life ==
On May 18, 1875, Humphrey married Maude Wilton Skinner, daughter of Illinois Supreme Court Justice Onias C. Skinner. Humphrey and his wife had three children: Harry C. Humphrey, Onias S. Humphrey and Mary E. Humphrey.

New York State Senate
| Preceded by new district | New York State Senate; 46th District; 1896–1902 | Succeeded by Frederick C. Stevens |
