= WABH =

Radio station in Bath, New York

- Bath, New York; United States
- Broadcast area: Elmira-Corning area
- Frequency: 1380 kHz
- Branding: 100.3 FM 1380 AM WABH

Programming
- Format: Country
- Affiliations: Nash Icon

Ownership
- Owner: Gordon Ichikawa; (Tower Broadcasting, LLC)

History
- First air date: November 17, 1962 (as WFSR)
- Former call signs: WFSR (1962–1973); WGHT (1973–1975); WVIN (1975–1990)

Technical information
- Licensing authority: FCC
- Facility ID: 52119
- Class: B
- Power: 10,000 watts day 450 watts night
- Transmitter coordinates: 42°18′52″N 77°17′9″W
- Translators: W262CX (100.3 MHz, Bath)

Links
- Public license information: Public file; LMS
- Website: 1380wabh.com

WABH (1380 AM) is a radio station broadcasting a country music format. Located in Bath, New York, United States, the station serves the Elmira-Corning area. The station is owned by Dawn Ichikawa, through licensee Tower Broadcasting, LLC, a company established by Ichikawa's late husband Gordon.

== History ==
The station first signed on November 17, 1962, with the call letters WFSR as a 500 watt daytimer. On December 1, 2008, WABH changed its format from oldies to sports.

On January 31, 2016, WABH changed their format from sports to adult standards.

Some time before the start of 2019, the station flipped to Nash Icon (adult country), picking up a format previously abandoned by WCKR, which Ichikawa would purchase in 2023.

In January 2026, Ichikawa agreed to sell the station to Tom and Desire Hoyt, who are also purchasing nearby AM country station WCJW. The station went silent, still listed under Ichikawa ownership and citing financial issues, in July 2026. Its country format, now being supplied by WCJW, moved to sister station WVIN-FM; its translator on FM 100.3 remained operational under the Hoyts' ownership.
