= WVIN-FM =

Simulcast of WCJW, Warsaw
- Bath, New York; United States
- Broadcast area: Elmira-Corning
- Frequency: 98.3 MHz
- Branding: CJ Country

Programming
- Format: Country
- Affiliations: FOX News Radio

Ownership
- Owner: Tom and Desire Hoyt; (WCJW, LLC)
- Sister stations: WCJW

History
- First air date: October 10, 1971; 55 years ago (as WEKT-FM)
- Former call signs: WEKT-FM (1971–1975)

Technical information
- Licensing authority: FCC
- Facility ID: 52121
- Class: A
- ERP: 4,500 watts
- HAAT: 112 meters (367 ft)
- Transmitter coordinates: 42°19′6″N 77°21′27″W

Links
- Public license information: Public file; LMS
- Webcast: Listen Live
- Website: wcjw.com

WVIN-FM (98.3 MHz) is a radio station broadcasting a country music format. Licensed to Bath, the station serves the Elmira-Corning area of New York's Southern Tier. The station is owned by Tom and Desire Hoyt. The studios are on Washington Street Extension in Bath.

WVIN-FM has an effective radiated power (ERP) of 4,500 watts as a Class A station.

== History ==
The station first signed on the air on October 10, 1971, as WEKT-FM with a power of 1.7 kW and was licensed to Hammondsport, New York. The station was owned by Taylor Aviation with offices on Bully Hill in Hammondsport.

In October 1974, the station was sold to Genkar, Inc., which also purchased WGHT in Bath, New York from Taylor Aviation. The studios of the two stations were consolidated in Bath, New York and the station began simulcasting with the callsigns WVIN FM & AM in 1975. Both bands were referenced in all on air call sign reporting because of simulcasting and different cities of license.

The combined stations were sold to Media Magic, Inc. in 1985. After less than four years of operation, Media Magic declared bankruptcy in February 1989 and the stations operated under bankruptcy protection until sale to Pembrook Pines Mass Media in May 1990. Pembrook Pines operated radio stations throughout New York, including Elmira and Newark.

By 1987, the license city for WVIN-FM had been changed to Bath, New York, matching its AM counterpart, which became WABH in 1990. Morning host Dave Taylor Smith joined the station in 1989.

In 2016, Gordon Ichikawa purchased the station following the collapse of the Pembrook Pines group. Ichikawa died in 2023, and his next of kin had no interest in the money-losing stations, which Ichikawa had largely operated as a hobby and passion project.

In 2026, WVIN was sold to its current owners Tom and Desire Hoyt. The couple flipped WVIN's format to country music, simulcasting their Warsaw sister station WCJW. (Its sister station WABH, which had been carrying a country format, went silent that year. ) Smith declined to stay with the station despite an offer to remain in his role.

== Past DJs ==
- William Bilancio
- John Snyder
- John Lyke
- Steve Rouse
