= Corinne Rider-Kelsey =

American singer and voice teacher

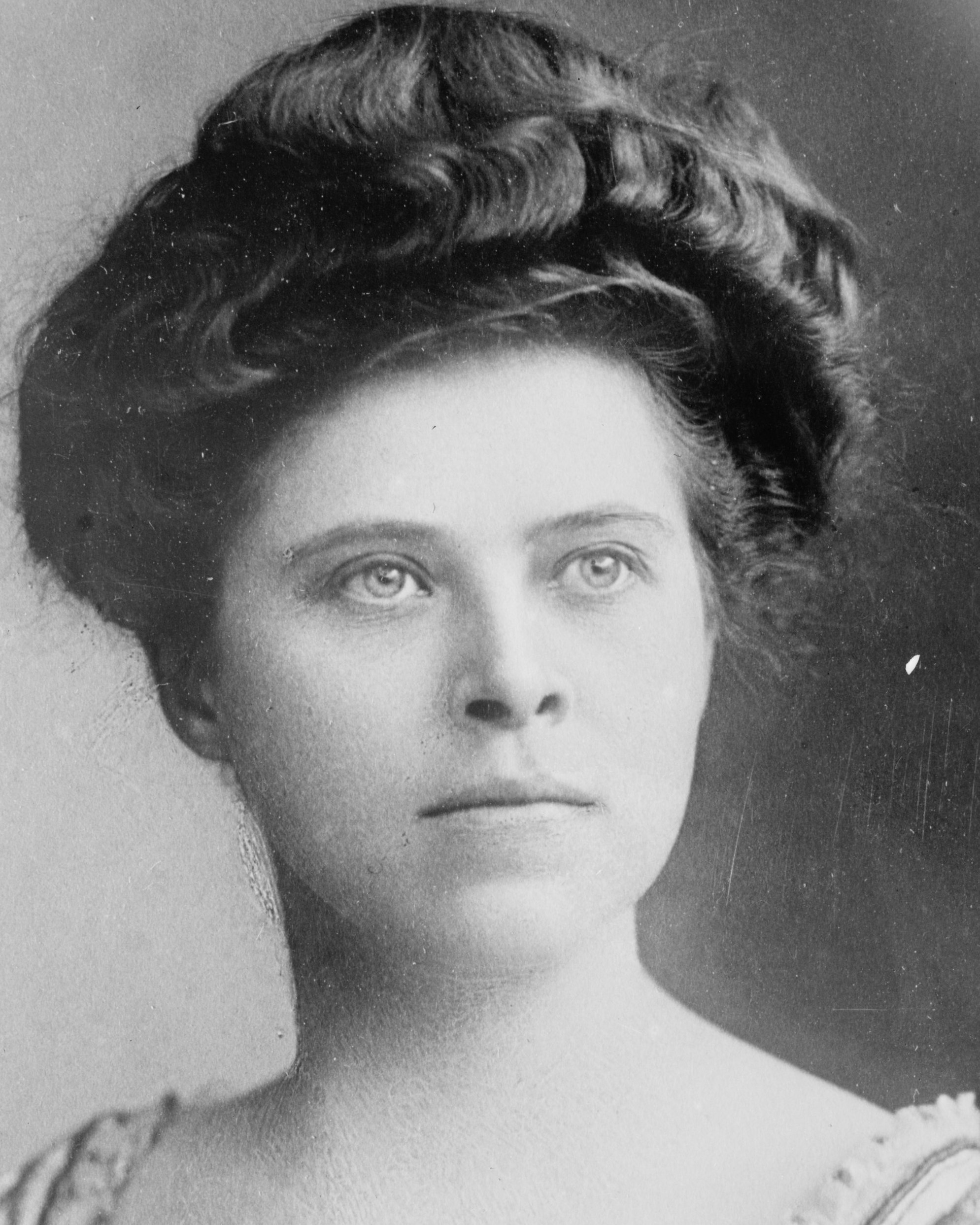
- Corinne Rider-Kelsey
- Born: Corinne Antoinette Rider; February 24, 1877; Leroy, New York, U.S.
- Died: July 10, 1947 (age 70); Toledo, Ohio, U.S.
- Other names: Corinne Rider-Reed, Corinne Reed
- Occupation(s): Singer, voice teacher

Corinne Antoinette Rider-Kelsey (February 24, 1877 – July 10, 1947), also known as Corinne Rider-Reed, was an American soprano singer.

== Early life and education ==
Corinne Rider was born in Le Roy, New York, the daughter of Ebenezer Rider and Fannie Wilson Rider (later Hovey). Her father died in 1881, and her widowed mother moved the family to Rockford, Illinois. She graduated from Oberlin Conservatory of Music.

== Career ==
Rider-Kelsey was a soprano who had a successful national career as a concert singer and church soloist before World War I. She sang in oratorios and appeared in a 1908 production of Carmen at Covent Garden. She was featured soloist at Carnegie Hall in 1909 at a concert with Gustav Mahler. She toured with the Boston Symphony Orchestra in 1910. Also in 1910, she and pianist Teresa Carreño were soloists in a concert in Minneapolis.

She gave joint recitals with baritone Claude Cunningham in Spokane, Minneapolis, and San Francisco in 1913. She was reputed to be "the highest paid church soloist" in the United States, earning $5000 per year at First Church of Christ, Scientist in New York.

Rider-Kelsey made several recordings between 1910 and 1926. She sang on radio broadcasts in the 1920s. In 1933 she sang at the Toledo Museum of Art, in a joint recital with pianist Mary Huggins. One of her voice students was Neira Riegger.

== Personal life ==
Rider married twice. Her first husband was George Russel Kelsey; they married in 1900 and later divorced. Her second husband was violinist and composer Lynnel Reed; they performed together, and married, in 1926. She died in 1947, at the age of 70, in Toledo, Ohio.
