= Seth M. Gates House =

Historic house in New York, United States

- U.S. National Register of Historic Places
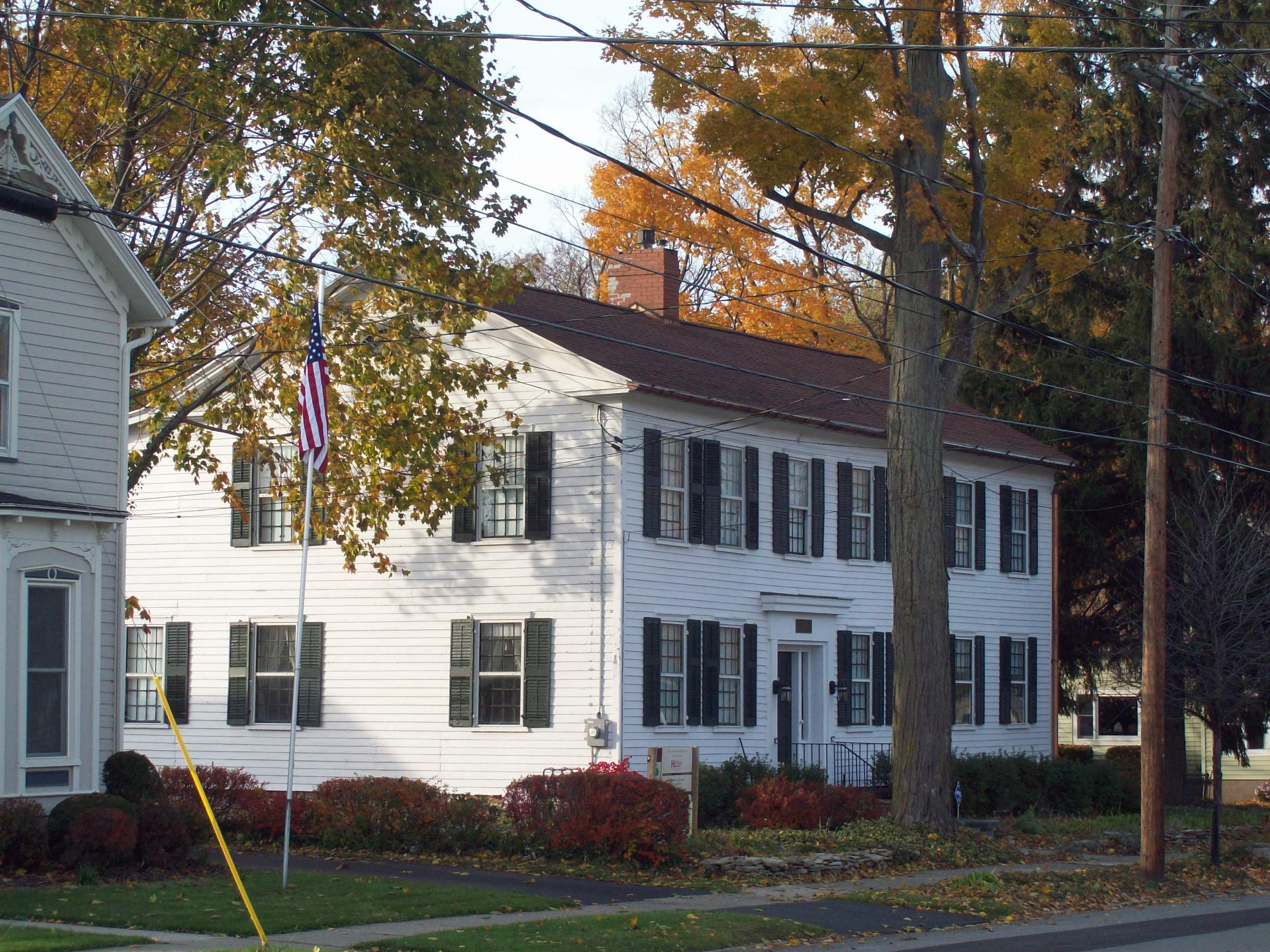
- Seth M. Gates House, October 2009

- Location within New York Location within the United States
- Location: 15 Perry Ave., Warsaw, New York
- Coordinates: 42°44′27″N 78°08′06″W
- Built: 1824
- Architectural style: Greek Revival, Federal
- NRHP reference No.: 92000031
- Added to NRHP: February 21, 1992

Seth M. Gates House is a historic home located at Warsaw in Wyoming County, New York. It is a two-story, wood-frame dwelling built in 1824 and expanded in about 1843. It started as a two-story, five-bay dwelling and the expansion added two bays on the north end. It features a Federal style cornice. Its owner from about 1843 until his death was Seth M. Gates (ca. 1800-ca. 1877), who served in the U.S. House of Representatives from 1838 to 1842. From the time of his purchase, for the next 15 years the house was a station on the Underground Railroad, Gates concealing the fugitives in the cellar and attic. From 1893 to 1924, it was home to the Society of Village Works, a local charitable organization. In 1924, it was sold to the local chapter of the Daughters of the American Revolution, who owned it until turning it over to the Warsaw Historical Society in 1977 for $1.00.

It was listed on the National Register of Historic Places in 1992.
