= Senator Humphreys (disambiguation) =

Robert Humphreys (politician) (1893–1977) was a U.S. Senator from Kentucky in 1956, and also served in the Kentucky State Senate. Senator Humphreys may also refer to:

- Andrew Humphreys (1821–1904), Indiana State Senate
- Benjamin G. Humphreys (1808–1882), Mississippi State Senate
- Parry Wayne Humphreys (1778–1839), Tennessee State Senate

== See also ==
- Stanley H. Humphries (born 1969), Kentucky State Senate
- Senator Humphrey (disambiguation)
