= William Martin Smallwood =

American biologist (1873–1949)

W. Martin Smallwood
Biographical details
- Born: April 30, 1873; Warsaw, New York, U.S.
- Died: November 21, 1949 (aged 76); Syracuse, New York, U.S.
- Education: Syracuse University; Harvard University

Playing career
- 1896–1899: Syracuse

Coaching career (HC unless noted)
- 1898: Allegheny

Head coaching record
- Overall: 4–4

William Martin Smallwood (April 30, 1873 – November 21, 1949) was an American biologist and professor at Syracuse University. From 1898 to 1902 he taught at Allegheny College.

== Education ==
Smallwood earned his B.A. and master's degree from Syracuse University and earned his PhD at Harvard University in 1902. He played for Syracuse Orange football from 1896 to 1899.

== Academic career ==
In 1902, Smallwood was named professor of comparative anatomy at Syracuse. In 1921, he was name head of the zoology department where he remained until being name professor emeritus in 1943. Smallwood died in 1949. He was elected a Fellows of the American Association for the Advancement of Science.

While at Allegheny College, Smallwood also served as the head football coach during the 1898 season, lead the team to a record of 4–4.

== Head coaching record ==
Year	Team	Overall	Conference	Standing	Bowl/playoffs
Allegheny Gators (Independent) (1898)
1898	Allegheny	4–4			
Allegheny:		4–4			
Total:		4–4			
