= Robert S. Stevens (politician) =

American politician

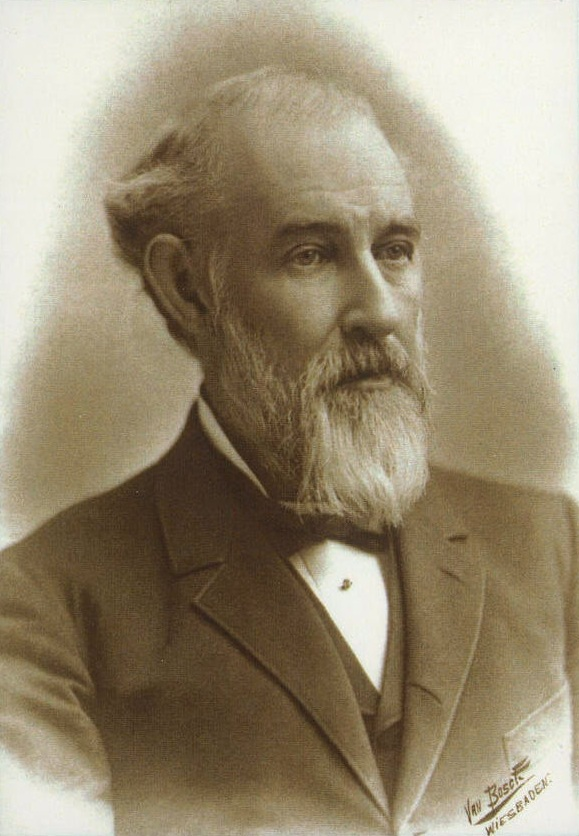

Member of the U.S. House of Representatives from New York's 31st district
- In office March 4, 1883 – March 3, 1885
- Preceded by: Richard Crowley
- Succeeded by: John G. Sawyer

Member of the Kansas Senate
- In office 1862–1863

Personal details
- Born: Robert Wadleigh Smith Stevens; March 27, 1824 Attica, Wyoming County; New York, US
- Died: February 23, 1893 (aged 68) Attica, Wyoming County; New York, US
- Resting place: Forest Hill Cemetery; Attica, Wyoming County; New York, US
- Party: Democratic Party
- Spouse: Mary Proctor Smith
- Children: Frederick C. Stevens
- Parent(s): Alden Sprague Stevens; Achsa (Smith) Stevens
- Profession: Banker; Politician; Railroad Executive; Lawyer

Robert S. Stevens (March 27, 1824 – February 23, 1893) was a 19th-century American politician, bank president, railroad executive, lawyer, Kansas state senator and U.S. representative from New York, serving one term from 1883 to 1885.

== Early life ==
Robert Wadleigh Smith Stevens was born in Attica, Wyoming County, New York, on March 27, 1824. The only son of Judge Alden Sprague and Achsa (Smith) Stevens, he was initially educated in preparation to attend college, but his formal schooling was ended when his family went through a period of financial hardship.

Stevens continued to study on his own while working as a clerk at an auction house and a local post office, and he achieved certification as a teacher in 1844. While teaching he read law with the Wyoming County District Attorney, and he was admitted to the bar in 1846.

== Career ==
As a lawyer, Stevens practiced in Attica and became involved in several business ventures. He became friendly with Governor Wilson Shannon, and in 1856 Stevens moved to Kansas Territory, where he practiced law with Shannon, and subsequently became involved in real estate development, coal mining, and constructing and operating railroads.

=== Early political activity ===
A Democrat, Stevens was a supporter of James Buchanan for President in 1856. After winning the presidential election, Buchanan appointed Stevens as a special commissioner, and in this capacity Stevens arranged the sale of land ceded to the United States in 1854 by the Kaskaskia, Peoria, Piankeshaw and Wea tribes.

Stevens served as Mayor of Lecompton in 1858, and served in the Kansas State Senate from 1862 to 1863. While in the Senate he was a target of the effort to remove Governor Charles L. Robinson. Robinson was accused of selling state bonds to Stevens at a discount, with Stevens re-selling the bonds at a profit and splitting the proceeds with Robinson. The state legislature attempted to impeach Robinson, but he was acquitted.

=== Business losses and move to Lawrence ===
Stevens was later involved in a federally sanctioned venture to commercially develop Sac and Fox reservations. The project, which included wood houses, sawmills, and small factories was looked on with disfavor by the Native American residents, who preferred to keep to their traditional ways of life. Stevens lost much of his fortune in this effort, and the federal government failed to reimburse him as called for in Stevens's contract, so it took him 20 years to retire the debt.

Stevens moved to Lawrence in 1862 and became president of a local bank. During the Lawrence massacre he intervened with Quantrill's Raiders in an effort to have them end their attack.

In 1869 Stevens won the contract to supervise construction of the Missouri–Kansas–Texas Railroad, nicknamed M-K-T or Katy, the first railroad to reach Indian Territory (now Oklahoma), after which it continued into Texas. As head of construction, and later the railroad's general manager, Stevens was responsible for the founding of Parsons in Kansas, Denison in Texas, and other towns along the route. Several of these towns have streets named after Stevens. He left the railroad during the period when Jay Gould controlled it. The Katy became profitable after construction, and Stevens became wealthy while in its employ, enabling him pay back his creditors in full by the end of the 1870s.

=== Retirement ===
In 1879 Stevens retired and returned to Attica, where he lived in retirement as a gentleman farmer and also invested in local businesses, including railroads. He also became involved in several civic and charitable causes, including constructing a library which was named for him, modernizing and expanding local schools and rebuilding the Attica Presbyterian Church.

=== Congress ===
In 1880 Stevens was an unsuccessful candidate for Congress. Stevens was elected as a Democrat to the Forty-eighth Congress and served in the United States House of Representatives as United States Representative for the Thirty-first Congressional District of New York from March 4, 1883, to March 3, 1885. He was an unsuccessful candidate for reelection in 1884.

== Death ==
Stevens died in Attica on February 23, 1893 at the age of 68. He is interred at Forest Hill Cemetery.

== Family life ==
In 1852 Stevens married Mary Proctor Smith, a distant cousin whose family operated a successful lumber business in Manchester, Massachusetts. Their son Frederick C. Stevens served in the New York State Senate and as the state Superintendent of Public Works.

U.S. House of Representatives
Preceded by Richard Crowley	Member of the U.S. House of Representatives from New York's 31st congressional district 1883–1885	Succeeded by John G. Sawyer
