= Neira Riegger =

American singer

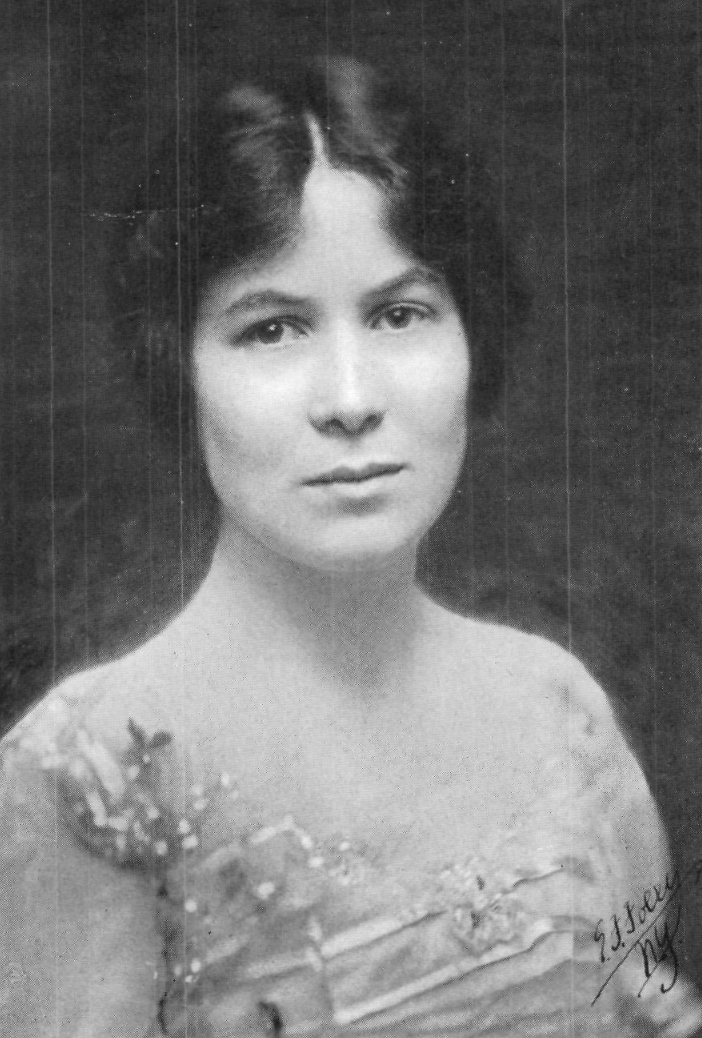
- Neira Riegger, from a 1917 program
- Born: Neira Donnelly Coffin; 1891; Warsaw, New York, U.S.
- Died: April 23, 1936 (age 45); Buffalo, New York, U.S.
- Other names: Nyra Dorrance
- Occupation(s): Singer, radio producer, theatrical director
- Relatives: Wallingford Riegger (brother-in-law)

Neira Riegger (1891 – April 23, 1936), also known as Nyra Dorrance, was an American singer, born Neira Donnelly Coffin (or Coffen). She was a performer and a radio producer. In her last year, she was founding director of the Opera Comique in Buffalo, New York.

== Early life and education ==
Neira Coffin was born in Warsaw, New York, the daughter of Henry Preston Coffin and Mary Donnelly Coffin (later Mrs. Earl Jenks). Her father was an actor. She attended Cornell University, graduated from the Ithaca Conservatory of Music, and worked with Corinne Rider-Kelsey. She was a member of Mu Phi Epsilon.

== Career ==
Riegger had a wide vocal range, was sometimes classified as a contralto, but she also sang in the soprano range. She sang in oratorios, recitals, festivals, and concerts, and as a church soloist. In 1920, she gave a program of Irish songs at Carnegie Hall, Aeolian Hall, and elsewhere. In 1921, she sang spirituals by Harry Burleigh at a concert in Brooklyn.

In 1924, she toured with Geraldine Farrar's production of Carmen. From 1925 to 1931, she was a member of the Philadelphia Civic Opera Company. In 1929, she was a soloist with the People's Chorus of New York in a concert at The Town Hall, and sang with the Troubadours, a medieval ensemble.

Riegger sang in radio broadcasts, and became a radio producer. She was associate music director at WOR radio in New York. In her last year, she was the first director of the Opera Comique in Buffalo, New York.

== Personal life ==
Neira Coffin married chemistry professor Harold Eaton Riegger in 1912; they had a son, Harold Jr. Her husband died in 1922, and she died in 1936, at the age of 45, from complications after surgery.
