= Seth M. Gates =

American politician

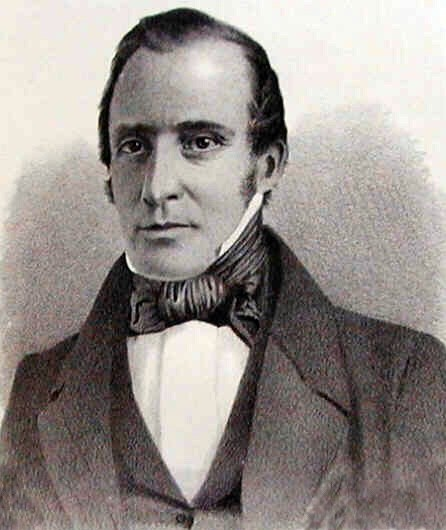
- Seth M. Gates, US Representative from New York

Member of the U.S. House of Representatives from New York's 29th district
- In office March 4, 1839 – March 3, 1843
- Preceded by: Harvey Putnam
- Succeeded by: Charles H. Carroll

Member of the New York State Assembly
- In office 1832–1833

Personal details
- Born: October 16, 1800 Winfield (town), New York, U.S.
- Died: August 24, 1877 (aged 76) Warsaw, New York, U.S.
- Resting place: Warsaw Town Cemetery; Warsaw, New York
- Party: Whig
- Parent(s): Seth Gates; Abigail (Merill) Gates
- Education: Middlebury Academy, Wyoming, N.Y.
- Profession: Merchant; Attorney; Politician

Seth Merrill Gates (October 16, 1800 – August 24, 1877) was an American merchant, attorney and politician. He served as a member of the New York State Assembly and as a United States representative from the U.S. state of New York.

== Early life ==
Gates was born in Winfield, New York, the son of Seth Gates and Abigail (Merrill) Gates. In 1806, he moved to Sheldon, New York, with his family. He attended the common schools and Middlebury Academy located in the village of Wyoming, New York, before working as a teacher.

== Career ==
He became inspector of the common schools, and in 1825, he served as the deputy sheriff of Le Roy, New York. He studied law and was admitted to the bar in 1827. He began the practice of law in Le Roy and served as supervisor of Le Roy in 1830.

In 1832, he served as a Whig member of the New York State Assembly. He declined to be a candidate for renomination. He was elected as an antislavery member of the twenty-sixth and twenty seventh U.S. Congresses, serving from March 4, 1839, to March 3, 1843. While in Congress, he drafted the protest signed by the Whigs in Congress against the Texas annexation. He was an unsuccessful candidate for reelection.

In 1843, he moved to Warsaw, New York, and continued the practice of law. He was also engaged in the lumber trade and a merchant. In 1848, on the Barnburners and Free Soil ticket, and in 1852, on the Free Democratic ticket, he was twice an unsuccessful candidate for Lieutenant Governor of New York. Due to his pronounced hostility to slavery, a southern planter offered $500 for his apprehension. From 1851 to 1865, he was the secretary of the Wyoming County Insurance Company. In 1861, he was appointed postmaster at Warsaw, serving until 1870.

== Death ==
Gates died on August 24, 1877, in Warsaw, and is interred in Warsaw Cemetery. His home, the Seth M. Gates House, at Warsaw, New York, was listed on the National Register of Historic Places in 1992.

U.S. House of Representatives
Preceded by Harvey Putnam	Member of the U.S. House of Representatives from New York's 29th congressional district 1839-03-04 – 1843-03-03	Succeeded by Charles H. Carroll
