= Milo H. Olin =

New York state politician and businessman (1842–1907)

Milo Hoyt Olin

Member of the New York State Assembly
- In office 1892–1893
- Constituency: Wyoming County

Personal details
- Born: December 3, 1842 Perry, New York, U.S.
- Died: May 20, 1907 Summerville, South Carolina, U.S.
- Party: Republican
- Spouse: Mary A. Chapin (m. 1863)
- Children: Walter T.; Richard T.; Mrs. J. N. Wyckoff; Mrs. Harry Green

Milo Hoyt Olin (December 3, 1842 – May 20, 1907) was an American businessman and politician from New York.

== Life ==
Olin was born on December 3, 1842, on his family farm in Perry, New York. He was the son of Truman Olin and Betsy Hoyt.

Olin attended Perry Academy, Middlebury Academy, and Lima Seminary. After he finished school, he went to work on the family farm. He later moved to the village of Perry, where he worked in the drug business for about nine years. In 1873, he started working in the book business. In 1874, he worked in the furnace business. A year later, he formed the firm Wynckoff, Tuttle & Olin, which manufactured farm implements. In 1882, he started working in the hardware business. In 1885, he was named president and general manager of a large knitting mill in Perry. In 1888, he became the first president of Perry's Citizen Bank, a position he served as for the rest of his life. He also supervised and managed three farms that totaled 430 acres.

In 1891, Olin was elected to the New York State Assembly as a Republican, representing Wyoming County. He served in the Assembly in 1892 and 1893. In the 1896 presidential election, he was a presidential elector for William McKinley and Garret Hobart. In 1901, he was appointed commissioner for the New York State Fair. In 1904, he was appointed trustee for the New York State Agricultural Experiment Station.

Olin was president of the New York State Breeders Association and a freemason. He married Mary A. Chapin in 1863. Their four children were Walter T., Dr. Richard T., Mrs. J. N. Wyckoff, and Mrs. Harry Green.

Olin died on May 20, 1907, in Summerville, South Carolina. He went to Summerville six weeks beforehand for health reasons. He was buried in the family lot in Hope Cemetery in Perry.

New York State Assembly
Preceded by I. Sam Johnson	New York State Assembly; Wyoming County; 1892-1893	Succeeded by Reuben J. Tilton
