= Earl Alonzo Brininstool =

American poet

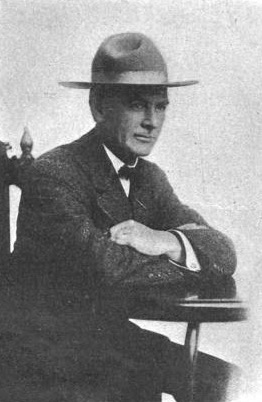
- Circa 1915
- Born: October 10, 1870; Warsaw, New York, U.S.
- Died: July 28, 1957 (aged 86)
- Occupation: Poet
- Writing career
- Pen name: E. A. Brininstool

Earl Alonzo Brininstool (October 11, 1870 – July 28, 1957), better known by E. A. Brininstool, was an American cowboy poet.

== Biography ==
Brininstool was born in Warsaw, New York, and preferred to be called E. A. Brininstool. He was a cowboy poet, but was not a working cowboy. He lived most his life in Los Angeles, rubbed elbows with Will Rogers and Charles Russell, who met regularly as part of a western artists group at the University Club in LA. He is best known for Trail Dust of a Maverick (1914) and Bozeman Trail (1922).

Brininstool was a prolific author on the subject of Indian Wars, especially on Little Big Horn. He died on July 28, 1957.
