= Edward J. Boomer =

Member of the Wisconsin State Assembly

Member of the Wisconsin State Assembly
- In office 1874–1874

Personal details
- Born: March 20, 1821 Warsaw, New York, U.S.
- Party: Republican
- Occupation: Politician

Edward J. Boomer was an American politician. He was a member of the Wisconsin State Assembly.

== Biography ==
Boomer was born on March 20, 1821, in Warsaw, New York. He later moved to Trenton, Dodge County, Wisconsin.

== Career ==
Boomer was a member of the Assembly during the 1874 Session. He was a Republican.
