= Wolcott J. Humphrey =

American politician

Wolcott Julius Humphrey (November 11, 1817 – January 19, 1890) was an American merchant, banker and politician from New York.

== Life ==
Humphrey was born in Canton, Connecticut, the son of Theophilus Humphrey (1776–1851) and Cynthia (Hayden) Humphrey (1776–1836). Shortly after his birth, the family removed to Sheldon, then in Genesee County. He became a tanner, like his father. On March 30, 1841, he married Amanda B. Martindale (c.1821–1873), and they had several children. He was a colonel of the State Militia when he resigned his commission in 1844.

He was appointed Postmaster of Sheldon in 1849. He was a Whig member of the New York State Assembly (Wyoming Co.) in 1851 and 1852.

In 1855, he removed to Bloomington, Illinois, and in 1856 chaired the convention which nominated Owen Lovejoy for Congress.

In 1858, he returned to New York, and settled first in North Java, and in 1864 removed to the county seat Warsaw.

He was Republican a member of the New York State Senate (30th D.) from 1866 to 1869, sitting in the 89th, 90th, 91st and 92nd New York State Legislatures. In October 1867, Humphrey was arrested, and charged with bribery and corruption in office, allegedly having accepted $500 to influence his action on a railroad bill. According to the affidavit signed by the accuser, Humphrey claimed to have taken the money, and handed it over charitably to an ill friend. Humphrey preferred a charge of perjury against his accuser, and was re-elected to the State Senate ten days later.

He was President of the Wyoming County Bank from 1871 until his death. In 1874, he married Hannah Mulholland (1840–1926), and they had two children.

He died in Warsaw, Wyoming County, New York, and was buried at the Warsaw Cemetery.

State Senator Lester H. Humphrey (1850–1902) was his nephew.

== Sources ==
- The New York Civil List compiled by Franklin Benjamin Hough, Stephen C. Hutchins and Edgar Albert Werner (1870; pg. 444, 472 and 475)
- Life Sketches of the State Officers, Senators, and Members of the Assembly of the State of New York, in 1867 by S. R. Harlow & H. H. Boone (pg. 103ff)
- Warsaw Cemetery records transcribed at US Gen Web Archives
- Tremayne's Table of the Post Offices in the United States (1850; pg. 128)
- Arrest of Senator W. J. Humphreys for Bribery in NYT on October 27, 1867
- ARREST OF A STATE SENATOR in NYT on October 28, 1867
- OBITUARY; WOLCOTT J. HUMPHREY in NYT on January 20, 1890

New York State Assembly
Preceded by James Sprague	New York State Assembly; Wyoming County; 1858	Succeeded by Alonzo B. Rose
New York State Senate
Preceded by Wilkes Angel	New York State Senate; 30th District; 1866–1869	Succeeded by James Wood
