= Monument Circle Historic District =

Historic district in New York, United States

- U.S. National Register of Historic Places
- U.S. Historic district
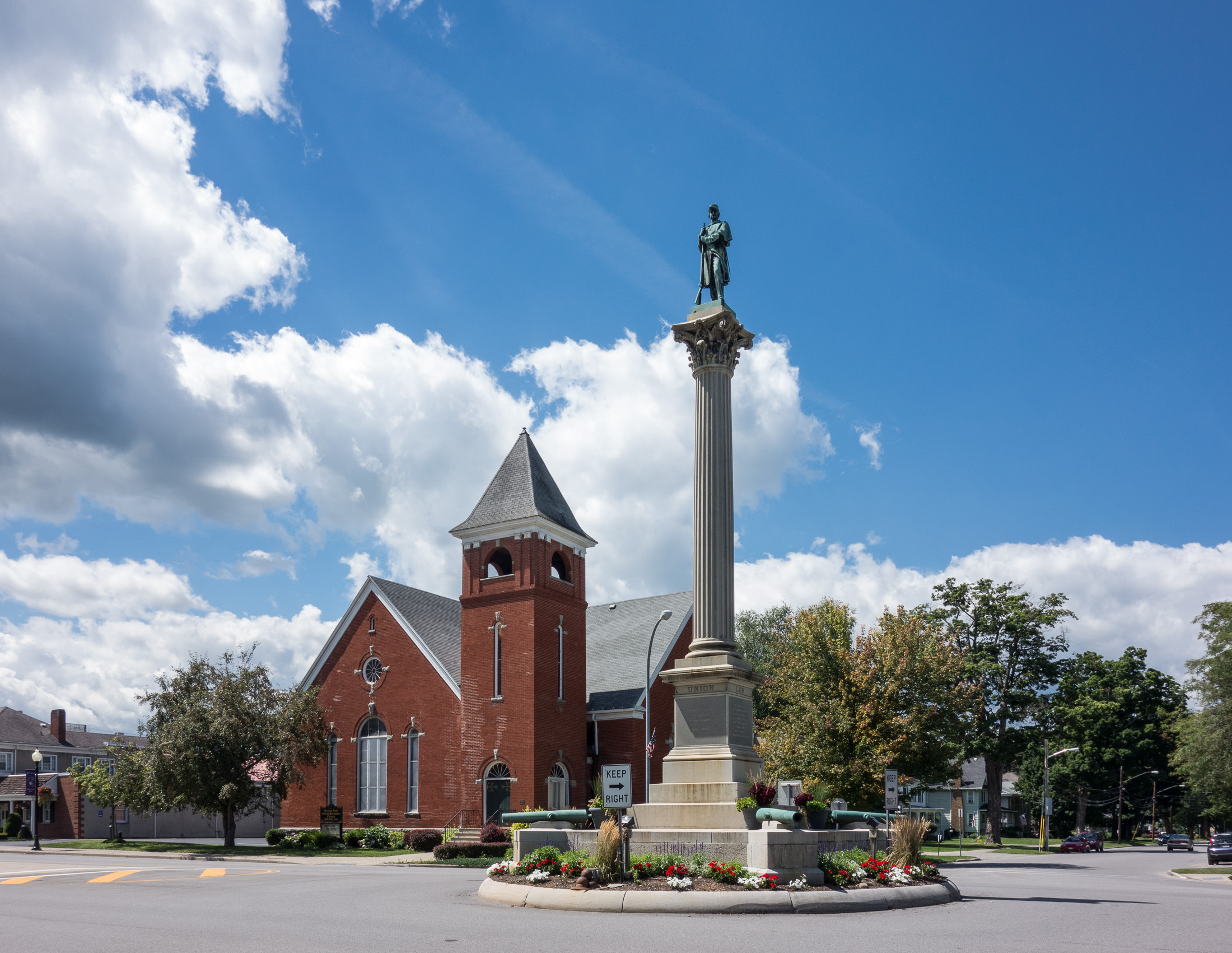
- Monument Circle, August 2013

- Location within New York Location within the United States
- Location: Roughly, E. Court St. from N. Main St. to Park St. and adjacent parts of Main and Park, Warsaw, New York
- Coordinates: 42°44′35″N 78°7′53″W
- Area: 18 acres (7.3 ha)
- Architectural style: Mid 19th Century Revival, Late 19th And 20th Century Revivals, Late Victorian
- NRHP reference No.: 92000447
- Added to NRHP: May 11, 1992

Monument Circle Historic District is a national historic district located at Warsaw in Wyoming County, New York. The district consists of 18 acres (73,000 m^{2}) and includes a broad range of architecturally significant resources. It encompasses 21 late 19th and early 20th century civic, religious, and domestic properties. Highlights include the Soldiers and Sailors Monument (1876–1877), Warsaw Public Library (1905), Augustus Frank House (1849-1850), Wyoming County Courthouse (1937), County Sheriff's Office and Jail (ca. 1901), and United Methodist Church (1901–1902).

The district was listed on the National Register of Historic Places in 1992.

== Gallery ==
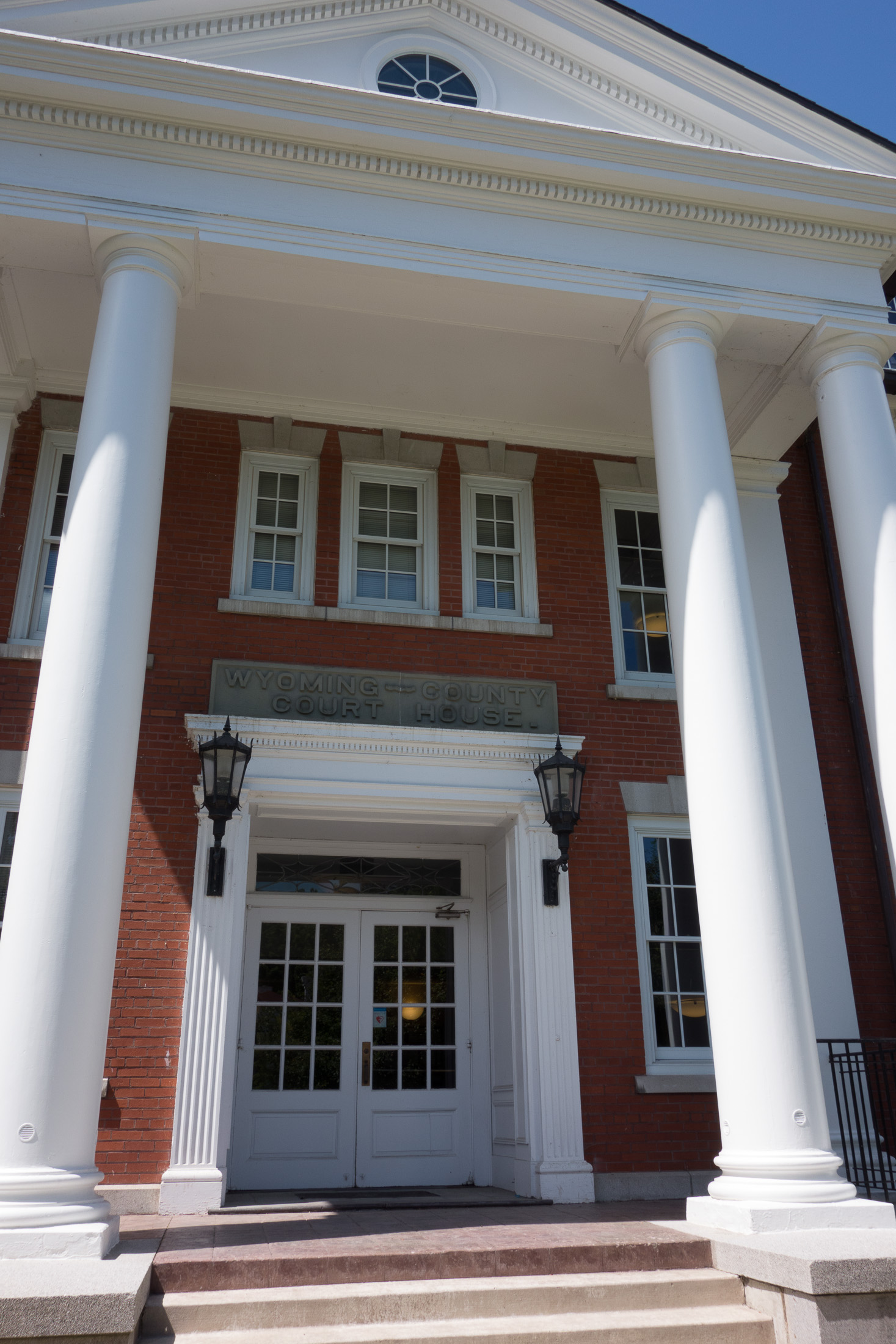
Wyoming County Courthouse, 1937

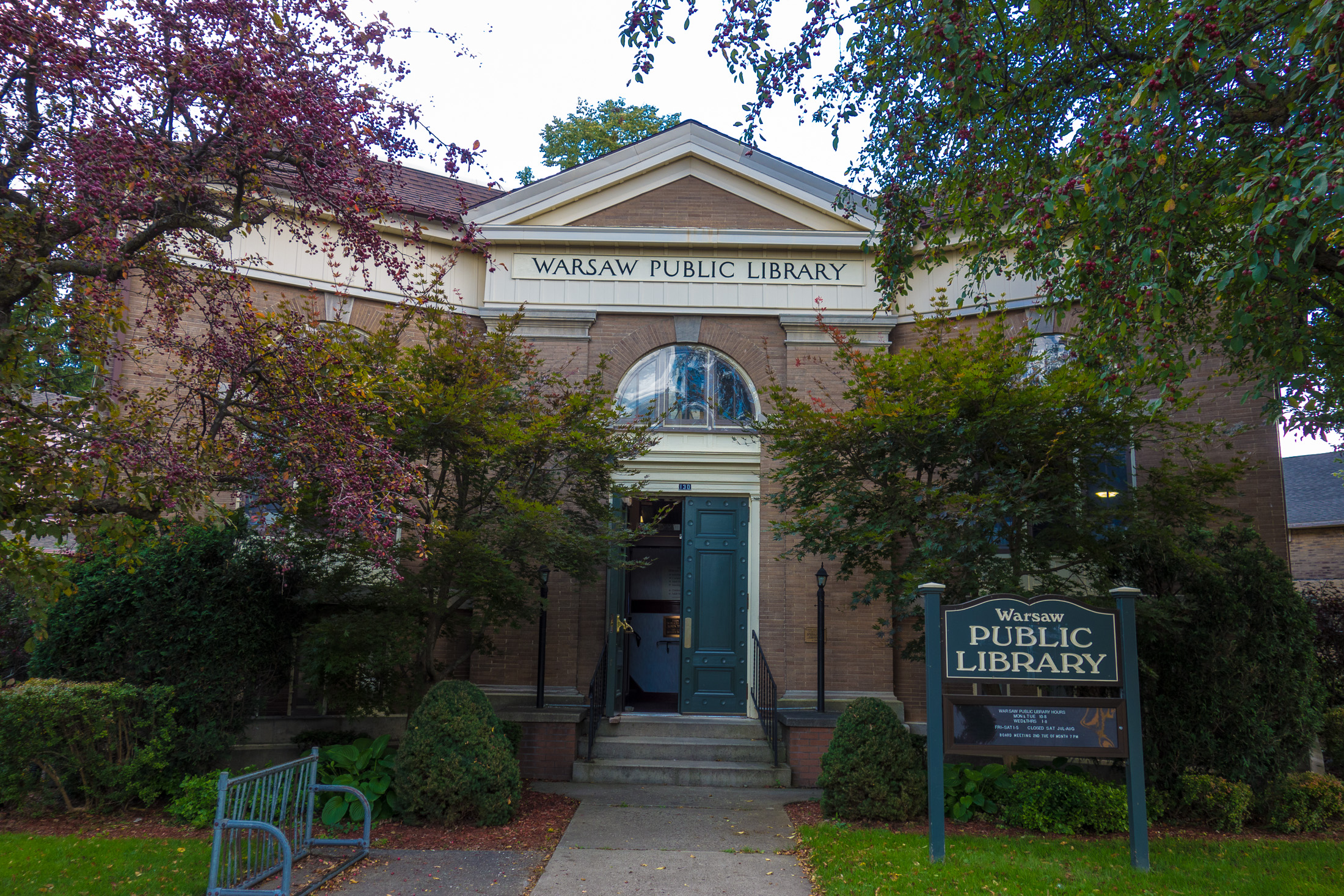
Warsaw Public Library, 1905

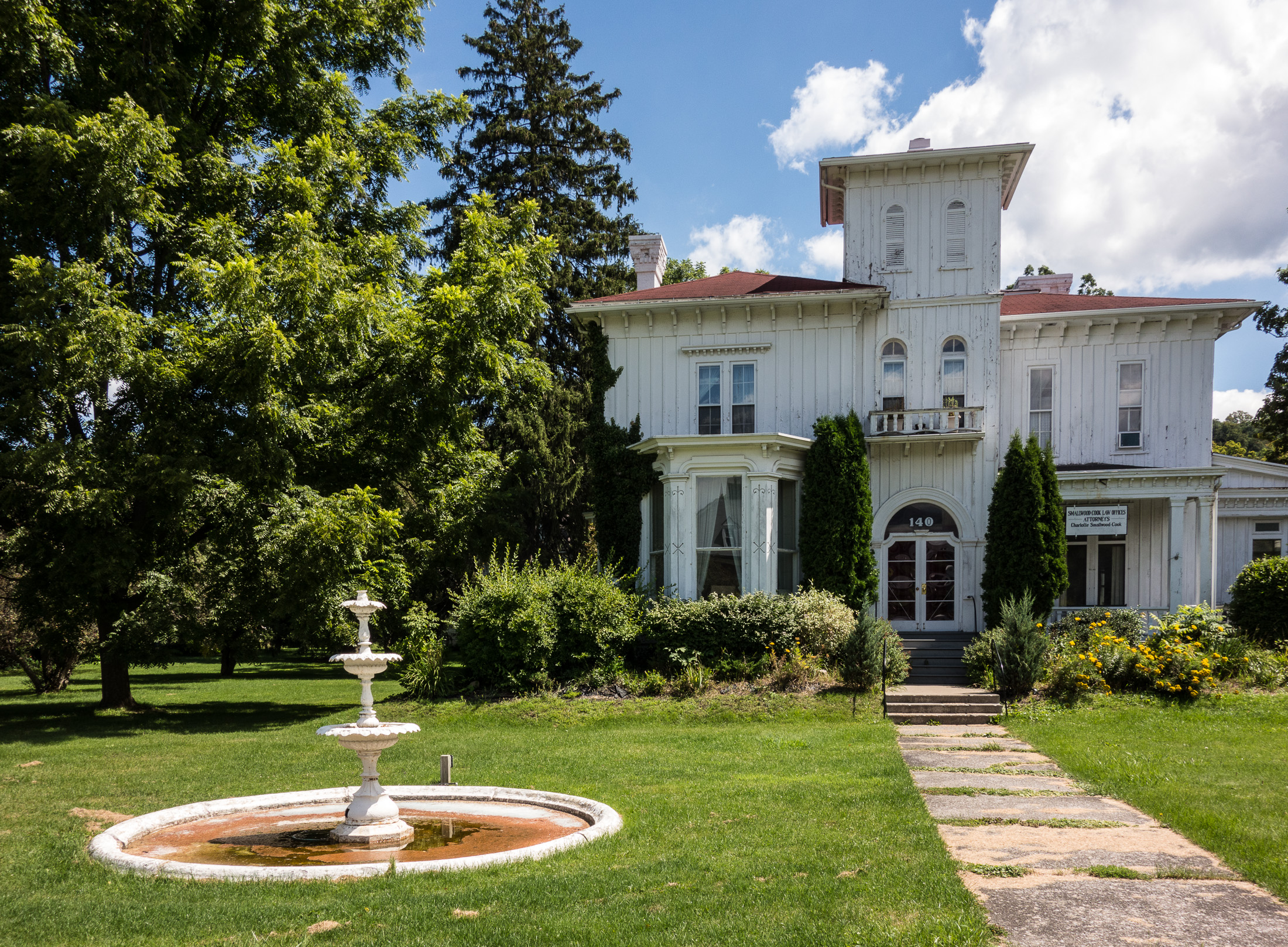
Augustus Frank House, 1850

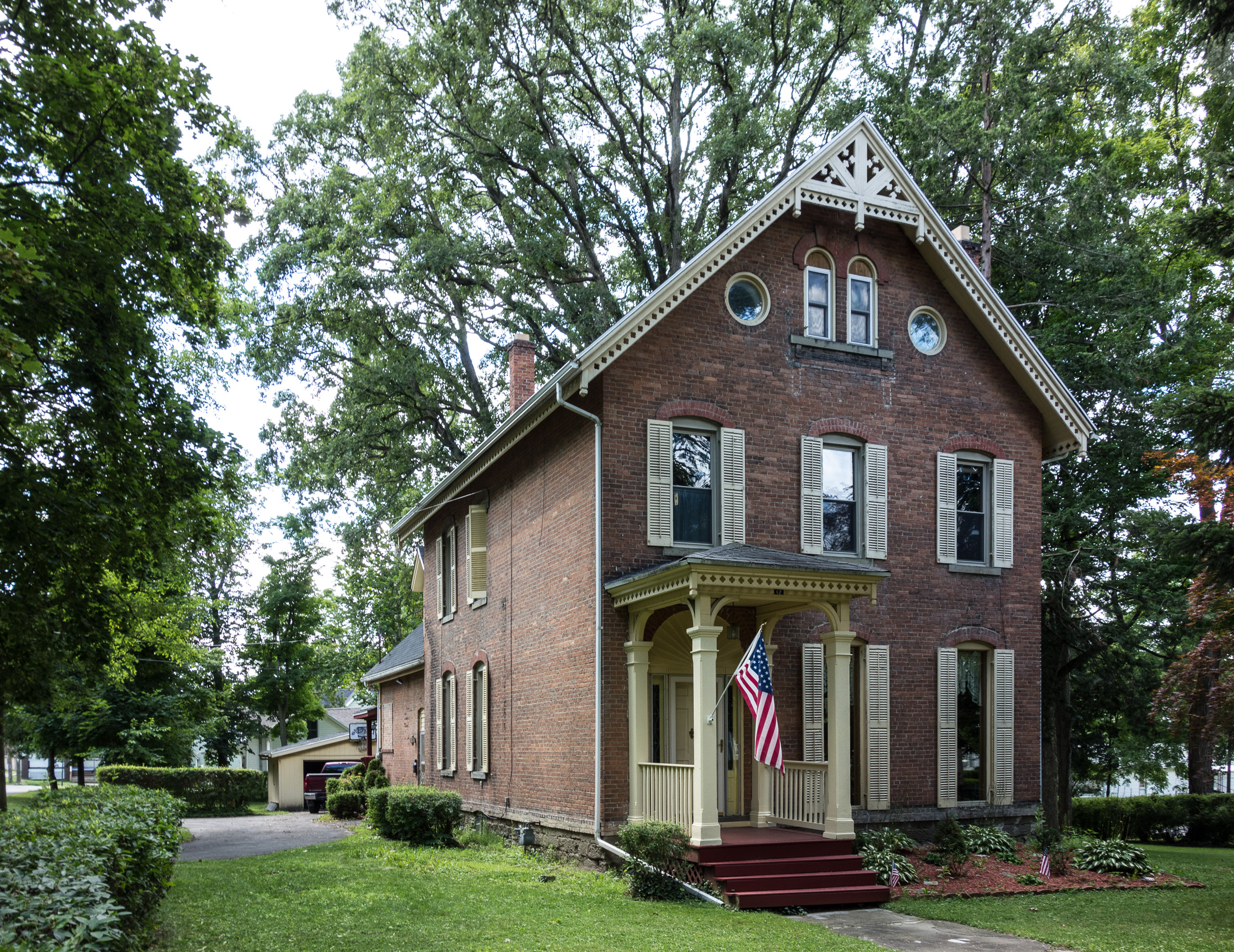
Historic home on East Court Street
