= Sydney Nettleton Fisher =

American historian (1906–1987)

Sydney Nettleton Fisher (August 8, 1906 – December 10, 1987) was an American historian of the Middle East.

== Life ==
Fisher was born in Warsaw, New York. He studied at Oberlin College, gaining an economics degree in 1928 and an M. A. degree in history in 1932. He received his PhD in history from the University of Illinois in 1935. After teaching mathematics at Robert College in Istanbul, he joined the history faculty of Ohio State University in 1937. He gained full professorship in 1955, and retired in 1972.

== Works ==
- The Foreign Relations of Turkey, 1481-1512, 1948
- Social Forces in the Middle East, 1955
- The Middle East: A History, 1959
- The Military in the Middle East; Problems in Society and Government, 1963
- (ed.) France and the European Community, 1963
- (ed. with John J. TePaske) Explosive Forces in Latin America, 1964
- (ed.) New Horizons for the United States in World Affairs, 1966
