= Trinity Church (Warsaw, New York) =

Historic church in New York, United States

- U.S. National Register of Historic Places
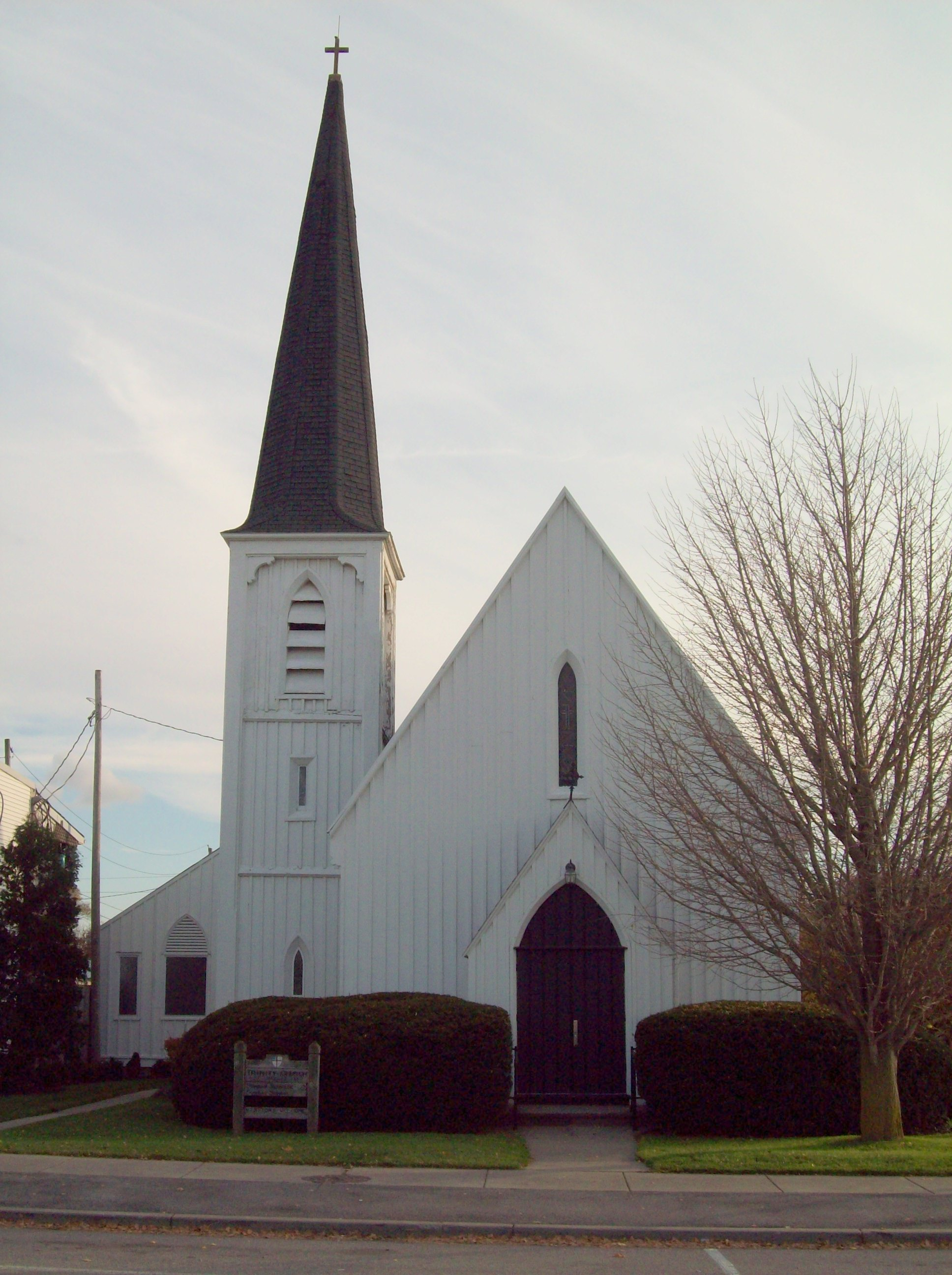
- Trinity Church, Warsaw NY, October 2009 prior to steeple demolition.

- Location within New York Location within the United States
- Location: W. Buffalo St., Warsaw, New York
- Coordinates: 42°44′23″N 78°8′3″W
- Built: 1853
- Architect: Richard Upjohn
- Architectural style: Gothic Revival
- NRHP reference No.: 80002798
- Added to NRHP: March 18, 1980

Trinity Church, also known as Trinity Episcopal Church, is an historic Episcopal church in Warsaw, Wyoming County, New York. The Carpenter Gothic style frame church was built in 1853-1854 and closely follows the plan and elevations of a country church published by Richard Upjohn (1802–1878) in his book Upjohn's Rural Architecture (1852). Upjohn's connection with the design of the church has been confirmed by a letter dated December 30, 1853.

It was listed on the National Register of Historic Places in 1980.

Due to years of deterioration, the steeple was removed in 2016.
