= Onias C. Skinner =

American judge

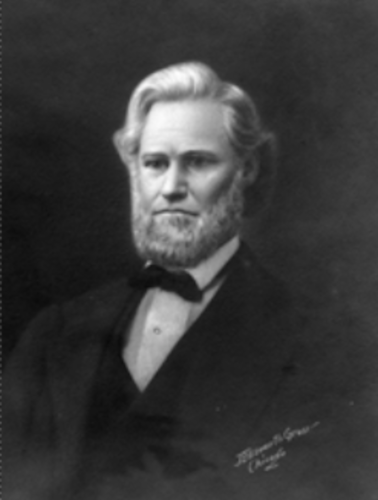
Skinner's portrait at the Illinois Supreme Court.

Onias Childs Skinner (July 21, 1817 – February 4, 1877) was an American jurist and legislator.

Born in Floyd, New York, Skinner moved to Peoria, Illinois in 1836. He then moved to Greenville, Ohio where he studied law and was admitted to the Ohio bar; Skinner served as deputy marshal of Darke County, Ohio.. In 1842, Skinner moved to Carthage, Illinois and then in 1844 moved to Quincy, Illinois where he stayed for the rest of his life. Skinner served in the Illinois House of Representatives from 1849 to 1851. In 1851, Skinner was elected an Illinois circuit court judge. From 1855 to 1858, Skinner served on the Illinois Supreme Court. Skinner served in the Illinois Constitutional Convention of 1870. Skinner died in Quincy, Illinois.
