= Frederick C. Stevens (New York politician) =

American politician from New York

Frederick Charles Stevens
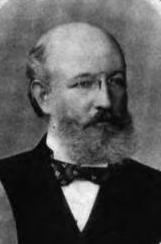
- Frederick C. Stevens (1903)

New York State Senator
- In office 1903–1906
- Preceded by: Lester H. Humphrey
- Succeeded by: William W. Armstrong

Personal details
- Born: 1856 Attica, Wyoming County; New York U.S.
- Died: March 14, 1916 (aged 104) Attica, Wyoming County; New York U.S.
- Resting place: Forest Hill Cemetery; Attica, Wyoming County; New York U.S.
- Party: Republican
- Spouse: Isabelle C. Sproule
- Children: Frederick Charles Stevens Jr. Robert Sproule Stevens; Marian Stevens; Helen Lee Stevens Gregory
- Parent(s): Robert S. Stevens; Mary P. (Smith) Stevens
- Education: Cornell University
- Profession: Stockman; Banker; Politician

Frederick Charles Stevens (June 5, 1856 - March 14, 1916) was an American politician from New York who served in the state senate and state legislature as well as Superintendent of Public Works.

== Early life ==
Born in Attica, Wyoming County, New York, Stevens attended Attica Collegiate Institute and Cornell University but left without degree due to ill health. He traveled west and worked for the Missouri–Kansas–Texas Railroad of which his father was a large stockholder.

== Career ==
When he returned to Attica, he established the Maplewood Stock Farm and raised prize-winning stock and also engaged in banking. He was a member of the New York State Senate (46th D.) from 1903 to 1906, sitting in the 126th, 127th, 128th and 129th New York State Legislatures. He was appointed Chairman of the Committee on Roads and Bridges and was a member of Finance, Villages, Banks, and Agriculture.

As Superintendent of Public Works Stevens served from 1907 to 1911.

== Death ==
Stevens died on March 14, 1916, in a barn on his farm in Attica, "from apoplexy", and is interred at the Forest Hill Cemetery there.

== Family life ==
Stevens was the son of Congressman Robert S. Stevens (1824–1893) and Mary P. (Smith) Stevens, he married Miss Isabelle C. Sproule in Hannibal, Mo. Jan 15, 1879. They had four children, Frederick Charles Stevens Jr., Robert Sproule Stevens, Marian Stevens, and Helen Lee Stevens Gregory.

New York State Senate
Preceded by Lester H. Humphrey	New York State Senate; 46th District; 1903–1906	Succeeded by William W. Armstrong
Government offices
Preceded by Nicholas Van Vranken Franchot	Superintendent of Public Works; 1907–1911	Succeeded by Charles E. Treman
