= United States Post Office (Warsaw, New York) =

- US Post Office-Warsaw
- U.S. National Register of Historic Places
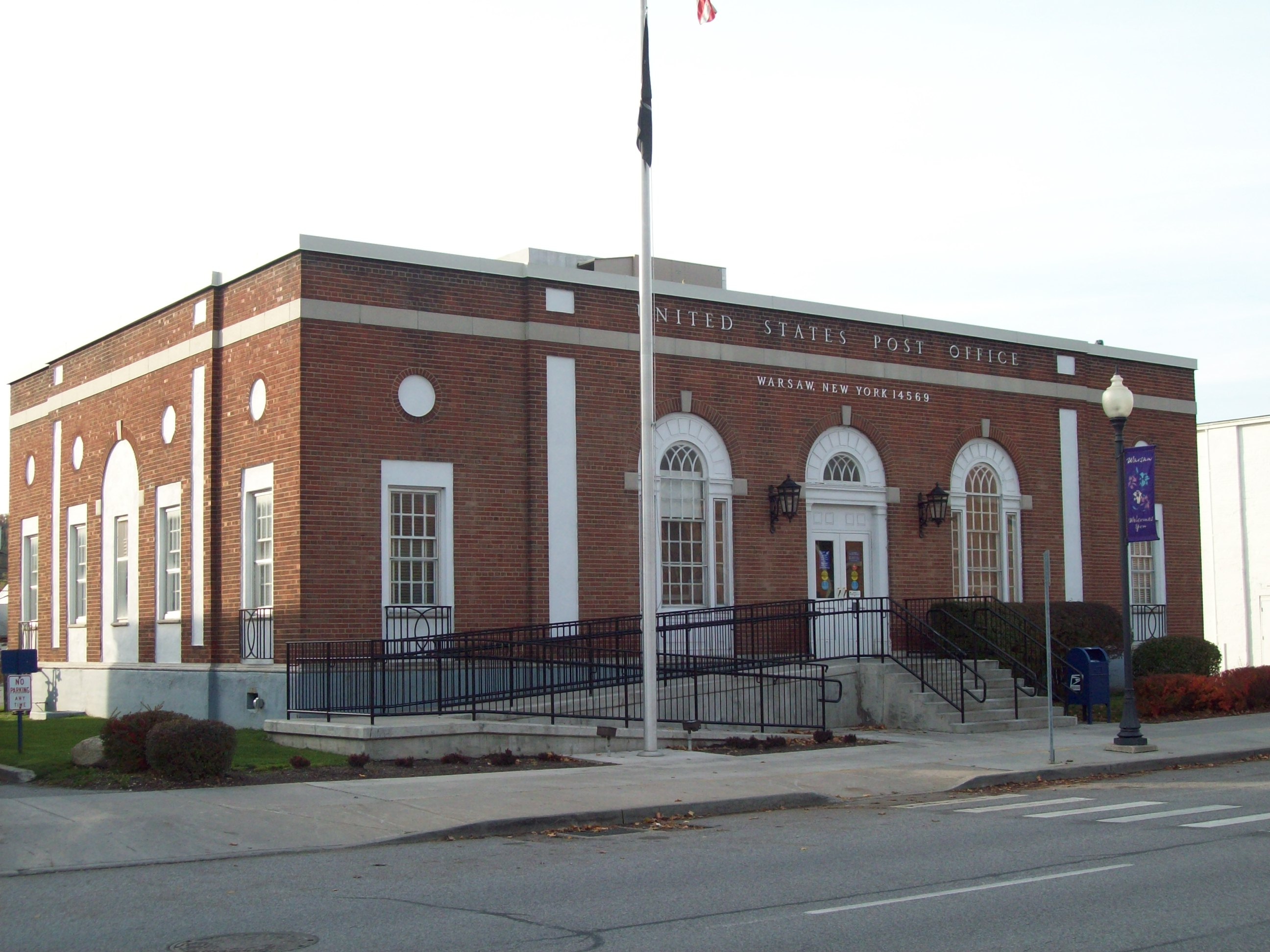
- U.S. Post Office, Warsaw NY, October 2009

- Location within New York Location within the United States
- Location: 35 S. Main St., Warsaw, New York
- Coordinates: 42°44′22″N 78°7′59″W
- Built: 1934
- Architect: Simon, Louis A.; US Treasury Department
- Architectural style: Colonial Revival
- MPS: US Post Offices in New York State, 1858-1943, TR
- NRHP reference No.: 88002441
- Added to NRHP: May 11, 1989

US Post Office-Warsaw is a historic post office building located at Warsaw in Wyoming County, New York. It was designed and built in 1934–1935 as a Works Progress Administration project, and is one of a number of post offices in New York State designed by the Office of the Supervising Architect of the Treasury Department, Louis A. Simon. It is a one-story, five bay steel frame brick structure on a raised reinforced concrete foundation in the Colonial Revival style.

It was listed on the National Register of Historic Places in 1989.
