= Warsaw Academy =

- U.S. National Register of Historic Places
- New York State Register of Historic Places
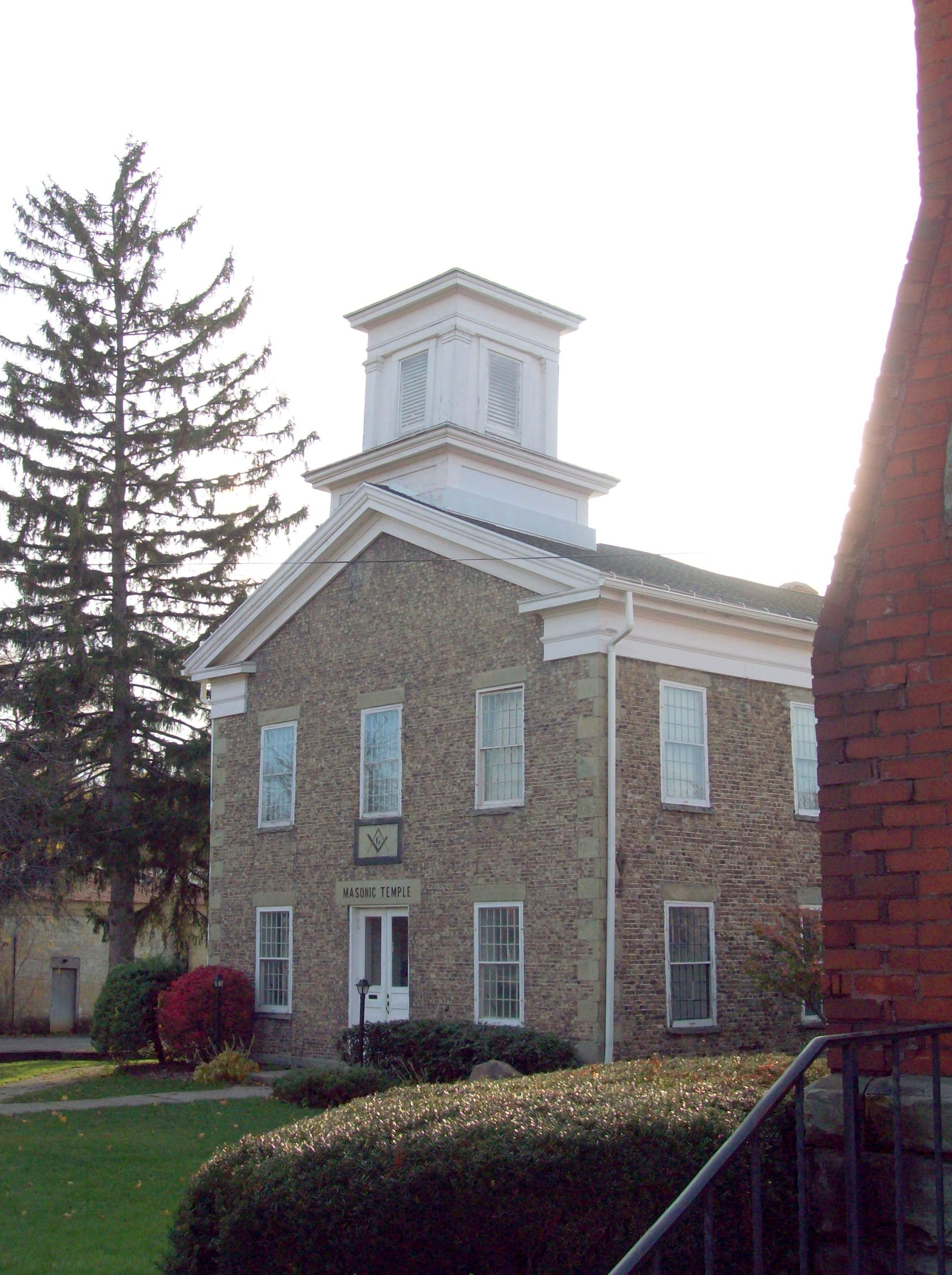
- Warsaw Academy, October 2009

- Location within New York Location within the United States
- Location: 73 S. Main St., Warsaw, New York
- Coordinates: 42°44′19″N 78°7′58″W
- Area: 0.5 acres (0.20 ha)
- Built: 1846
- Architect: Chester Hurd
- Architectural style: Greek Revival
- NRHP reference No.: 80002799
- NYSRHP No.: 12141.000007

Significant dates
- Added to NRHP: January 3, 1980
- Designated NYSRHP: June 23, 1980

Warsaw Academy is a historic school in Warsaw, Wyoming County, New York. It is a two-story cobblestone structure measuring 35 feet by 57 feet in the Greek Revival style. Built as a school in 1846, the building has housed a Masonic temple since 1907. A two-story brick wing was added in 1854 and a one-story stucco wing was added in 1928.

It was listed on the National Register of Historic Places in 1980.
