= Warsaw (village), New York =

Warsaw
- Village
- Village of Warsaw
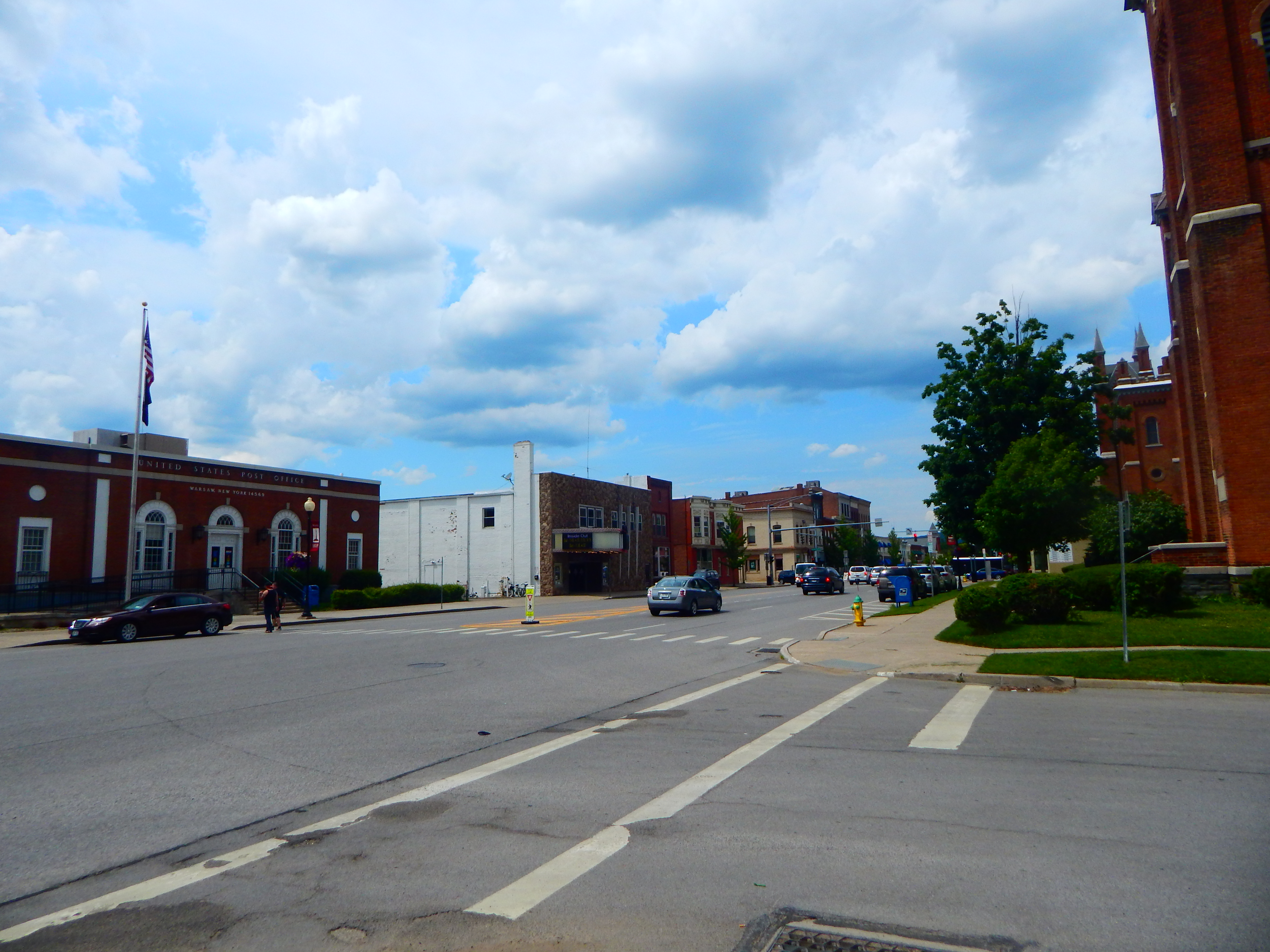
- Downtown Warsaw along NY 19 in June 2015.

- Location within New York
- Coordinates: 42°44′28″N 78°8′8″W
- Country: United States
- State: New York
- County: Wyoming
- Town: Warsaw
- Settled: 1803
- Incorporated: April 17, 1843
- Named for: Likely Warsaw, Poland

Area
  - Total: 4.10 sq mi (10.63 km^{2})
  - Land: 4.10 sq mi (10.63 km^{2})
  - Water: 0 sq mi (0.00 km^{2})
- Elevation: 1,014 ft (309 m)

Population (2020)
  - Total: 3,646
  - Density: 888.0/sq mi (342.86/km^{2})
- Time zone: UTC-5 (EST)
  - Summer (DST): UTC-4 (EDT)
- ZIP code: 14569
- Area code: 585
- FIPS code: 36-78333
- GNIS feature ID: 0968827
- Website: www.villageofwarsawny.gov

Warsaw is a village in and the county seat of Wyoming County, New York, United States. It lies inside the Town of Warsaw. The village of Warsaw is near the center of the town in a valley. The population was 3,473 at the 2010 census. A branch of Genesee Community College is in Warsaw.

== History ==
The village of Warsaw was incorporated in 1843. The central core of the village is known as the Monument Circle Historic District and was listed on the National Register of Historic Places in 1992. Also on the National Register of Historic Places are the Warsaw Downtown Historic District, Seth M. Gates House, Trinity Church, U.S. Post Office, and Warsaw Academy.

=== Abolitionism ===
In the decades before the American Civil War, Warsaw was a center of abolitionist sentiment and activity. Warsaw's local anti-slavery society was formed in 1833, the same year as the American Anti-Slavery Society. Several homes and churches are documented to have participated in the Underground Railroad. In November 1839 the anti-slavery Liberty Party was formed in a meeting at Warsaw's Presbyterian Church. The area sent abolitionists Seth M. Gates and Augustus Frank to serve in the United States Congress. An anti-slavery newspaper called The American Citizen was published in Warsaw.

== Geography ==
According to the United States Census Bureau, the village has a total area of 4.1 square miles (10.7 km^{2}), all land.

The Oatka Creek flows northward through the village, which is located in the Wyoming Valley.

== Demographics ==
Historical population
Census	Pop.	Note	%±
1870	1,631		—
1880	1,910		17.1%
1890	3,120		63.4%
1900	3,048		−2.3%
1910	3,206		5.2%
1920	3,622		13.0%
1930	3,477		−4.0%
1940	3,554		2.2%
1950	3,713		4.5%
1960	3,653		−1.6%
1970	3,619		−0.9%
1980	3,619		0.0%
1990	3,830		5.8%
2000	3,814		−0.4%
2010	3,473		−8.9%
2020	3,646		5.0%
U.S. Decennial Census

As of the census of 2000, there were 3,814 people, 1,484 households, and 887 families residing in the village. The population density was 924.9 inhabitants per square mile (357.1/km^{2}). There were 1,575 housing units at an average density of 381.9 per square mile (147.5/km^{2}). The racial makeup of the village was 96.96% White, 0.52% Black or African American, 0.39% Native American, 1.07% Asian, 0.10% from other races, and 0.94% from two or more races. Hispanic or Latino of any race were 0.87% of the population.

There were 1,484 households, out of which 32.0% had children under the age of 18 living with them, 44.3% were married couples living together, 12.0% had a female householder with no husband present, and 40.2% were non-families. 34.1% of all households were made up of individuals, and 17.3% had someone living alone who was 65 years of age or older. The average household size was 2.32 and the average family size was 3.01.

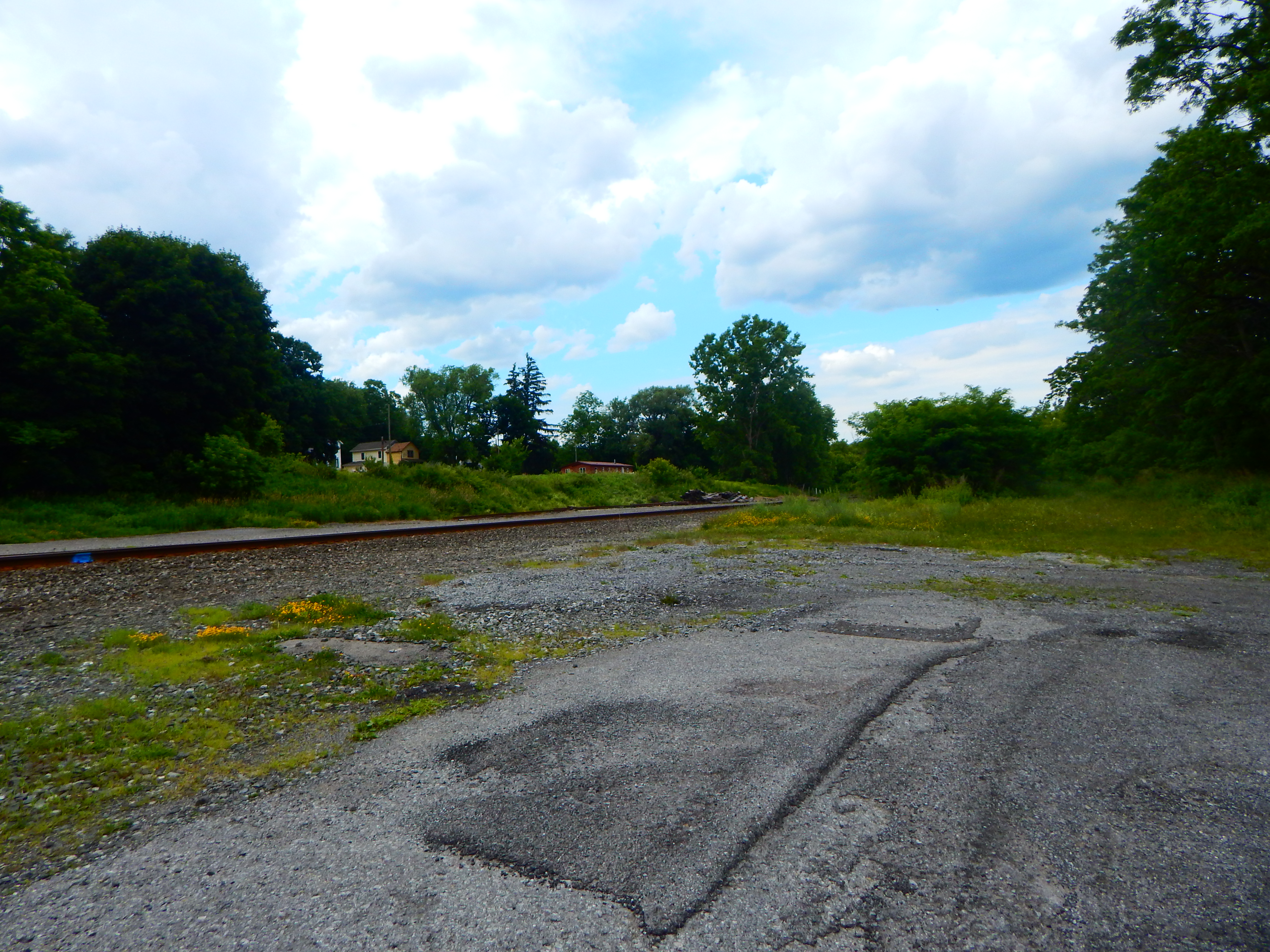
Warsaw station site for the Erie Railroad in June 2015

In the village, the population was spread out, with 23.8% under the age of 18, 7.9% from 18 to 24, 27.4% from 25 to 44, 19.2% from 45 to 64, and 21.7% who were 65 years of age or older. The median age was 39 years. For every 100 females, there were 85.0 males. For every 100 females age 18 and over, there were 78.6 males.

The median income for a household in the village was $35,592, and the median income for a family was $42,540. Males had a median income of $33,682 versus $21,540 for females. The per capita income for the village was $17,483. About 9.8% of families and 11.0% of the population were below the poverty line, including 17.2% of those under age 18 and 8.7% of those age 65 or over.

== Education ==
All of the village is in Warsaw Central School District.
