= Warsaw, New York =

- Town
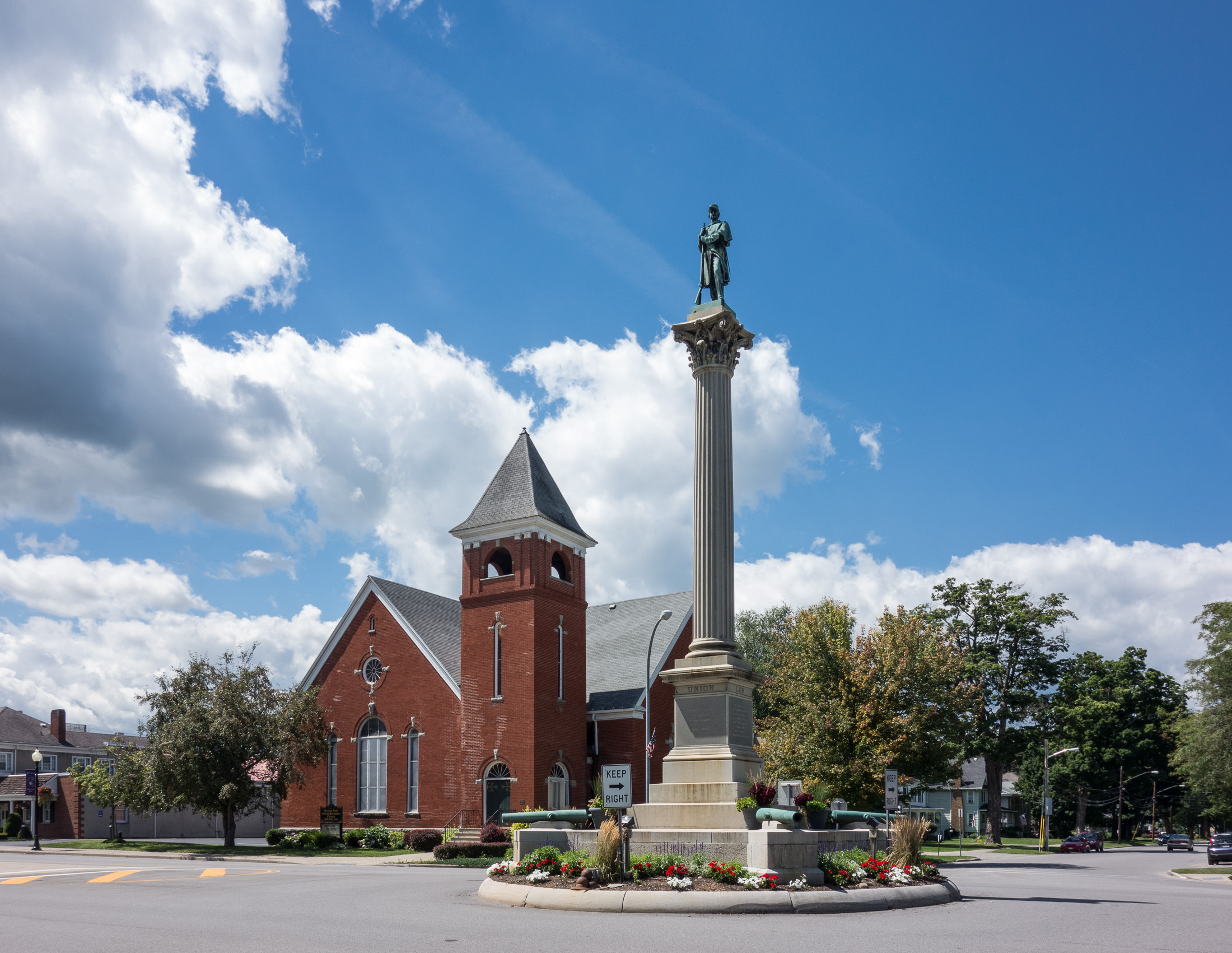
- Monument Circle Historic District

- Location within Wyoming County and New York
- Coordinates: 42°44′24″N 78°07′59″W
- Country: United States
- State: New York
- County: Wyoming County
- Founded: 1804

Area
  - Total: 35.47 sq mi (91.86 km^{2})
  - Land: 35.42 sq mi (91.73 km^{2})
  - Water: 0.050 sq mi (0.13 km^{2}) 0.14%
- Elevation: 1,020 ft (310 m)

Population (2020)
  - Total: 5,316
  - Density: 150.1/sq mi (57.95/km^{2})
- Time zone: UTC-5 (EST)
  - Summer (DST): UTC-4 (EDT)
- ZIP code: 14569
- Area code: 585
- FIPS code: 36-121-78344
- GNIS feature ID: 0968827
- Website: Town of Warsaw

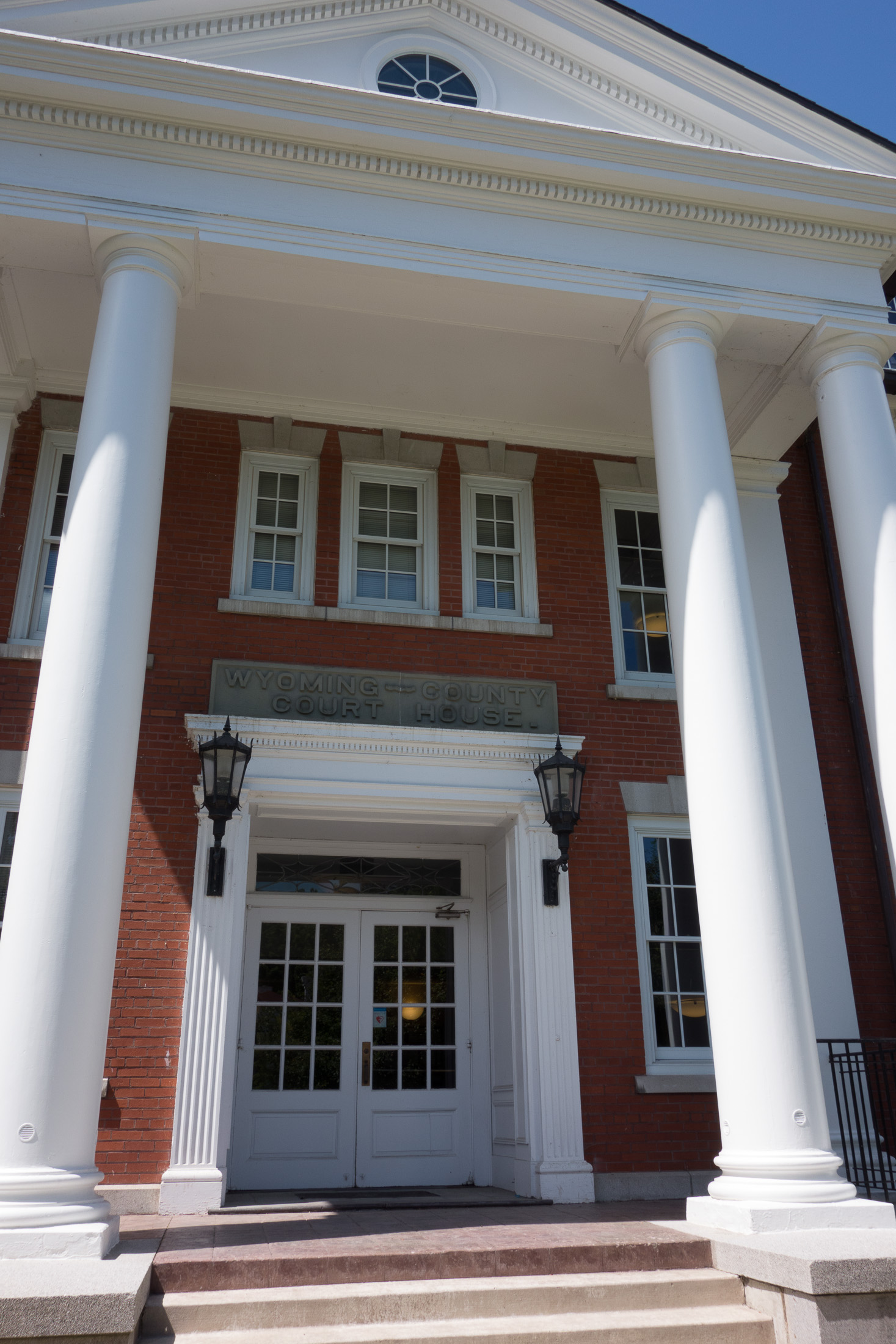
Wyoming County Courthouse

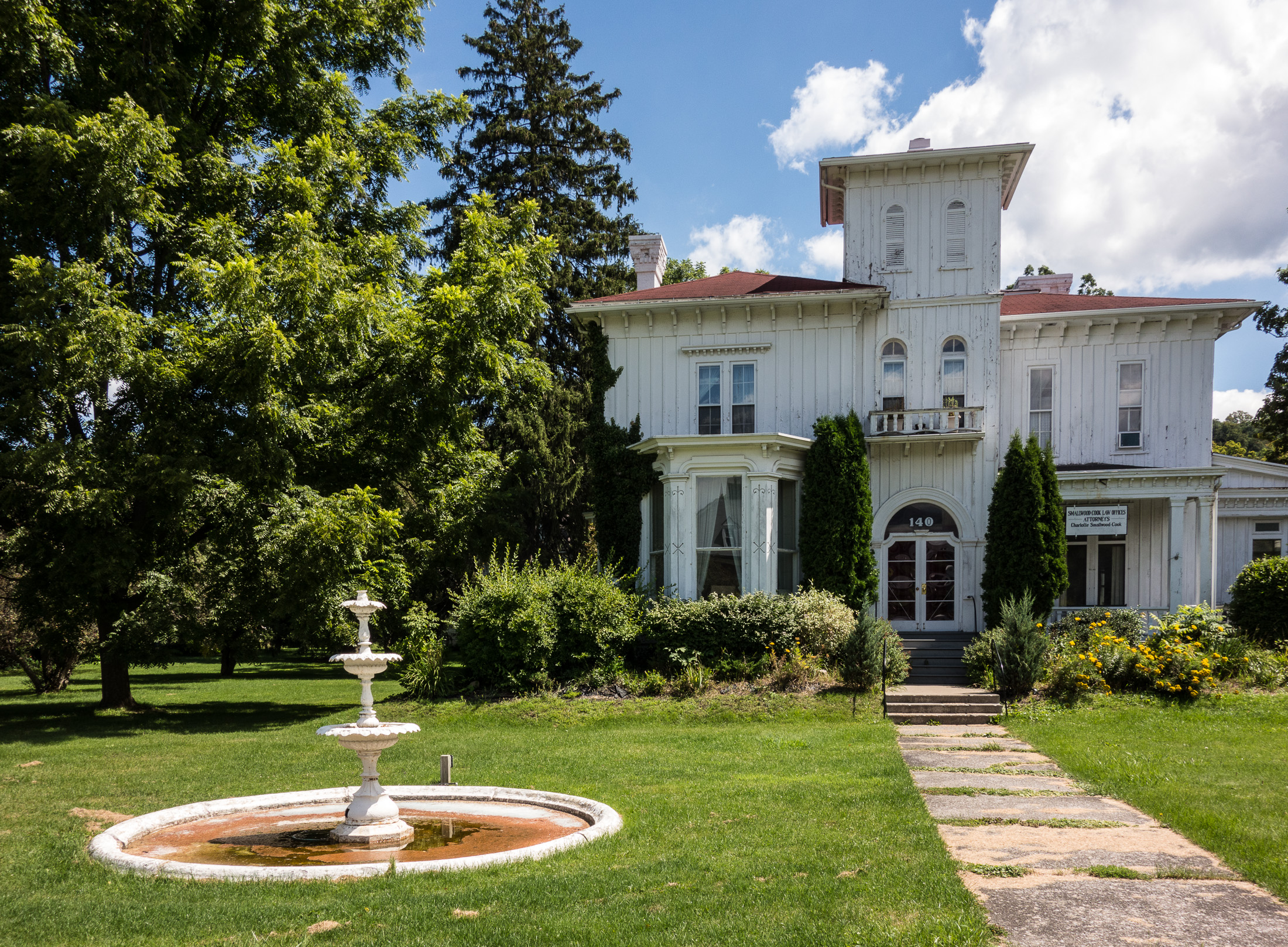
Augustus Frank House

Warsaw is a town in Wyoming County, in the U.S. state of New York. The population was 5,316 at the 2020 census. It is located approximately 37 miles east southeast of Buffalo and approximately 37 miles southwest of Rochester. The town may have been named after Warsaw, Poland.

The Town of Warsaw is centrally located in the county and contains a village, also called Warsaw. The village is the county seat of Wyoming County.

== History ==
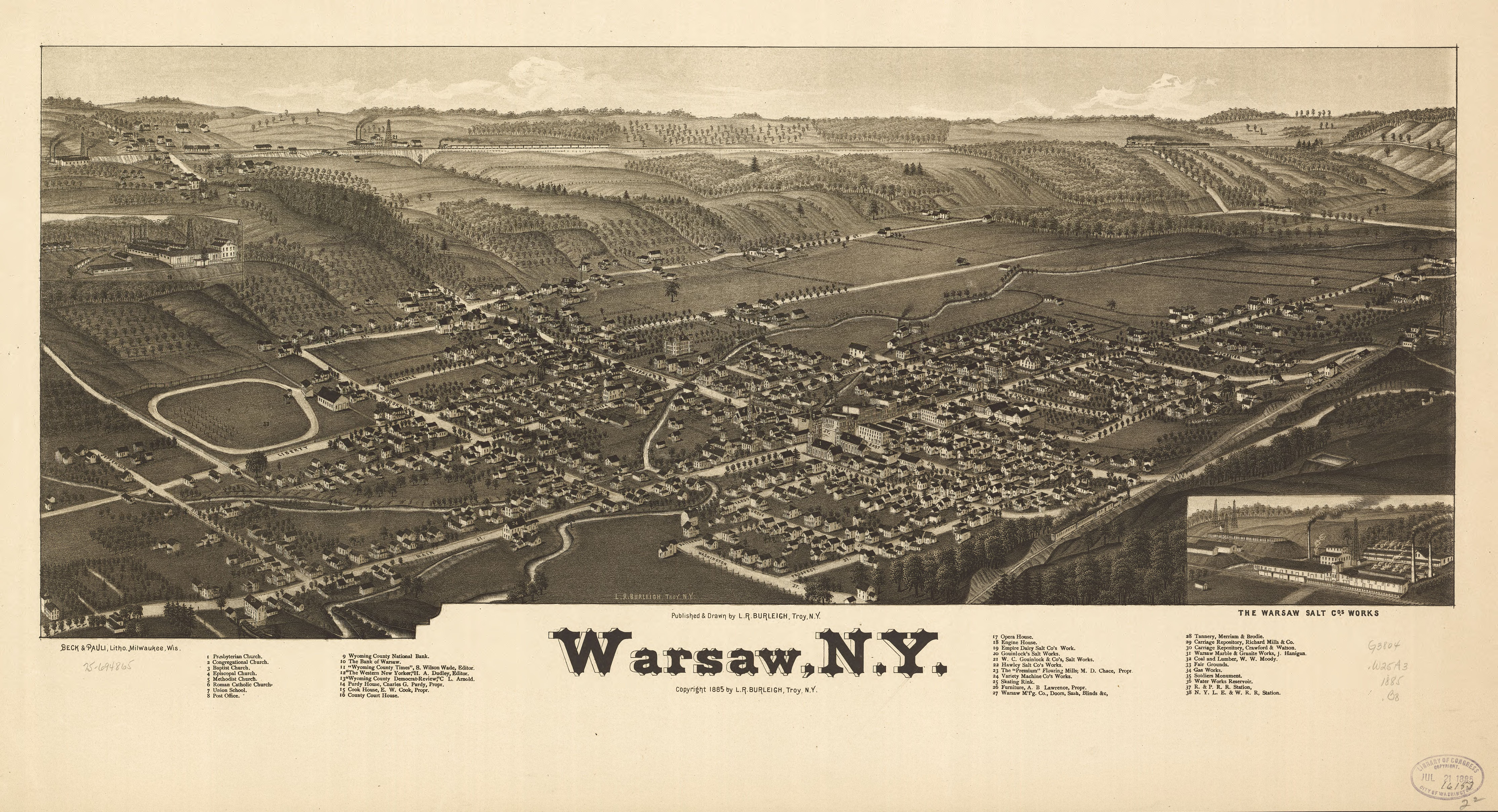
Perspective map of Warsaw from 1885 with list of landmarks by L.R. Burleigh. Inset image of Warsaw Salt Cos. Works

The Town of Warsaw was founded in 1803 from the Town of Batavia (in Genesee County). In 1812, part of Warsaw was used to form the new town of Town of Middlebury. Again in 1814, Warsaw was reduced to form the Town of Gainesville.

=== Abolitionism ===
In the decades before the American Civil War, Warsaw was a center of abolitionist sentiment and activity. Warsaw's local anti-slavery society was formed in 1833, the same year as the American Anti-Slavery Society. Several homes and churches are documented to have participated in the Underground Railroad. In November 1839 the anti-slavery Liberty Party was formed in a meeting at Warsaw's Presbyterian Church. The area sent abolitionists Seth M. Gates and Augustus Frank to serve in the United States Congress. An anti-slavery newspaper called The American Citizen was published in Warsaw.

== Geography ==
According to the United States Census Bureau, the town has a total area of 35.5 square miles (92 km^{2}), of which 35.4 square miles (92 km^{2}) is land and 0.1 square mile (0.1 km^{2}) (0.14%) is water.

Oatka Creek flows northward through the Wyoming Valley in the town. U.S. Route 20A crosses the town.

=== Climate ===
Climate data for Warsaw 6 SW, New York, 1991–2020 normals, 1952-2020 extremes: 1820ft (555m)
Month	Jan	Feb	Mar	Apr	May	Jun	Jul	Aug	Sep	Oct	Nov	Dec	Year
Record high °F (°C)	64 (18)	69 (21)	80 (27)	86 (30)	88 (31)	92 (33)	99 (37)	91 (33)	95 (35)	83 (28)	76 (24)	70 (21)	99 (37)
Mean maximum °F (°C)	52.8 (11.6)	51.4 (10.8)	61.8 (16.6)	75.6 (24.2)	81.4 (27.4)	84.7 (29.3)	85.6 (29.8)	83.9 (28.8)	81.8 (27.7)	75.0 (23.9)	64.7 (18.2)	54.1 (12.3)	87.1 (30.6)
Mean daily maximum °F (°C)	27.7 (−2.4)	29.9 (−1.2)	37.9 (3.3)	51.3 (10.7)	64.1 (17.8)	72.2 (22.3)	76.0 (24.4)	75.1 (23.9)	67.9 (19.9)	56.2 (13.4)	43.8 (6.6)	33.1 (0.6)	52.9 (11.6)
Daily mean °F (°C)	20.3 (−6.5)	21.8 (−5.7)	29.3 (−1.5)	41.6 (5.3)	54.3 (12.4)	63.0 (17.2)	67.1 (19.5)	66.0 (18.9)	58.6 (14.8)	47.7 (8.7)	36.5 (2.5)	26.6 (−3.0)	44.4 (6.9)
Mean daily minimum °F (°C)	13.0 (−10.6)	13.6 (−10.2)	20.6 (−6.3)	32.0 (0.0)	44.5 (6.9)	53.9 (12.2)	58.2 (14.6)	56.9 (13.8)	49.3 (9.6)	39.2 (4.0)	29.3 (−1.5)	20.0 (−6.7)	35.9 (2.2)
Mean minimum °F (°C)	−6.4 (−21.3)	−4.3 (−20.2)	2.5 (−16.4)	18.7 (−7.4)	30.5 (−0.8)	40.8 (4.9)	47.9 (8.8)	46.7 (8.2)	37.3 (2.9)	27.4 (−2.6)	14.4 (−9.8)	2.6 (−16.3)	−9.6 (−23.1)
Record low °F (°C)	−30 (−34)	−28 (−33)	−18 (−28)	5 (−15)	20 (−7)	29 (−2)	36 (2)	30 (−1)	25 (−4)	7 (−14)	−4 (−20)	−23 (−31)	−30 (−34)
Average precipitation inches (mm)	3.53 (90)	2.72 (69)	3.10 (79)	3.51 (89)	3.95 (100)	4.28 (109)	4.38 (111)	4.01 (102)	4.06 (103)	4.34 (110)	3.69 (94)	3.62 (92)	45.19 (1,148)
Average snowfall inches (cm)	36.9 (94)	27.5 (70)	21.8 (55)	7.2 (18)	0.2 (0.51)	0.0 (0.0)	0.0 (0.0)	0.0 (0.0)	0.0 (0.0)	0.6 (1.5)	13.0 (33)	34.7 (88)	141.9 (360.01)
Source 1: NOAA(1981-2010 Snowfall)
Source 2: XMACIS2 (records & monthly max/mins)

== Demographics ==
Historical population
Census	Pop.	Note	%±
1820	1,658		—
1830	2,474		49.2%
1840	2,841		14.8%
1850	2,624		−7.6%
1860	2,958		12.7%
1870	3,143		6.3%
1880	3,227		2.7%
1890	4,468		38.5%
1900	4,341		−2.8%
1910	4,308		−0.8%
1920	4,396		2.0%
1930	4,361		−0.8%
1940	4,452		2.1%
1950	4,585		3.0%
1960	4,803		4.8%
1970	4,721		−1.7%
1980	5,074		7.5%
1990	5,342		5.3%
2000	5,423		1.5%
2010	5,064		−6.6%
2020	5,316		5.0%
U.S. Decennial Census

As of the census of 2000, there were 5,423 people, 2,113 households, and 1,354 families residing in the town. The population density was 153.1 inhabitants per square mile (59.1/km^{2}). There were 2,232 housing units at an average density of 63.0 per square mile (24.3/km^{2}). The racial makeup of the town was 97.29% White, 0.39% Black or African American, 0.31% Native American, 0.94% Asian, 0.09% from other races, and 0.98% from two or more races. Hispanic or Latino of any race were 0.68% of the population.

There were 2,113 households, out of which 31.4% had children under the age of 18 living with them, 49.3% were married couples living together, 11.0% had a female householder with no husband present, and 35.9% were non-families. 30.3% of all households were made up of individuals, and 14.8% had someone living alone who was 65 years of age or older. The average household size was 2.39 and the average family size was 2.98.

In the town, the population was spread out, with 23.9% under the age of 18, 7.4% from 18 to 24, 27.3% from 25 to 44, 22.3% from 45 to 64, and 19.1% who were 65 years of age or older. The median age was 39 years. For every 100 females, there were 89.2 males. For every 100 females age 18 and over, there were 84.3 males.

The median income for a household in the town was $37,699, and the median income for a family was $42,647. Males had a median income of $31,672 versus $21,691 for females. The per capita income for the town was $17,279. About 8.5% of families and 10.6% of the population were below the poverty line, including 17.4% of those under age 18 and 6.6% of those age 65 or over.

== Government ==
The Town of Warsaw is governed by a town council elected by popular vote.

Position	Officeholder	Term length (in years)
Mayor	Joe Robinson	
Councilperson	Shani Jones	4
Councilperson	David Mateer	4
Councilperson	Chris Lonneville	4
Councilperson	Kevin B. Zeches	4
Supervisor	Rebecca Ryan	4
Deputy Supervisor	Shani Jones	
Clerk/Tax Collector	Cathy Smith	4
Justice	Robert Fusani	
Justice	Ronald Errington	
Assessor	Countywide Real Property Tax Services	
Supt. of Highways	Jeff Royce	4
Registrar	Cathy Smith	
Historian	Sally Smith	
Zoning Officer	Robert Martin	
Library Trustees	Linda Wick	3
Library Trustees	Deborah N. Gillen	3

== Communities and locations in the Town of Warsaw ==
- East Warsaw – a community east of the village
- Monument Circle Historic District – is listed on the National Register of Historic Places.
- Newburg – a hamlet near the south town line on Route 19
- Oatka – a hamlet southeast of Warsaw village
- Perry - Warsaw Municipal Airport ( 01G ) – a general aviation airport east of the village of Warsaw on Route 20A
- Pierce Corners – a settlement in the northwest part of the town
- Rock Glen – a hamlet south of Warsaw village on Route 19
- Seth M. Gates House – a historic house in Warsaw
- South Warsaw – a hamlet south of Warsaw on Route 19
- Thompsons Crossing – a hamlet in the northwest part of the town
- Warsaw – village of Warsaw on Route 20A

== Education ==
Most of the town is in Warsaw Central School District. Other parts of the town are in Wyoming Central School District, Perry Central School District, and Letchworth Central School District.

== Notable people ==
- James C. Adamson, former NASA astronaut and retired Colonel of the United States Army
- Edward J. Boomer, former Wisconsin State Assemblyman
- Earl Alonzo Brininstool, cowboy poet
- Barber Conable (1922 – 2003) - Ten-term United States Congressman and later World Bank President.
- Ice Box Chamberlain, former MLB pitcher
- Ben Doller, poet, writer
- James Rood Doolittle (January 3, 1815 – July 27, 1897), U.S. Senator from Wisconsin, District Attorney of Wyoming County, NY; Colonel of the New York State Militia;
- Sydney Nettleton Fisher, Middle East historian
- Jabez G. Fitch, U.S. Marshal for Vermont
- Augustus Frank (1826 – 1895) was a United States representative from New York during the American Civil War
- Merrill Edwards Gates, ninth President of Rutgers College (now Rutgers University), sixth President of Amherst College
- Seth M. Gates, former US Congressman
- Lester H. Humphrey, former New York State Senator
- Andrew J. Lorish (November 8, 1832–August 11, 1897), a Medal of Honor recipient for his actions in the American Civil War, died in Warsaw, New York.
- John Warwick Montgomery (born 1931) - Emeritus Professor of Law and Humanities, writer, lecturer, and public debater in the field of Christian apologetics
- William Patterson, former US Congressman
- Neira Riegger, singer and radio producer
- Diann Roffe, former World Cup alpine ski racer
- Martin Smallwood, former football coach
- Zera Luther Tanner, former naval commander, inventor
