= Case Western Reserve University School of Medicine =

Private medical school in Cleveland, Ohio, US

Coordinates: 41°30′18″N 81°36′16″W

- Type: Private medical school
- Established: 1843; 183 years ago
- Parent institution: Case Western Reserve University
- Dean: Stanton Gerson
- Faculty: 8,900 (2025)
- Students: 4,896 (2025)
- Undergraduates: 450 (2025)
- Doctoral students: 416 (PhD; 2025)
- Location: Cleveland, Ohio, United States
- Website: case.edu/medicine

Case Western Reserve University School of Medicine (CWRU SOM, CaseMed) is the medical school of Case Western Reserve University, a private research university in Cleveland, Ohio. It is the largest biomedical research center in Ohio, and is primarily affiliated with University Hospitals Cleveland Medical Center, Cleveland Clinic, and the MetroHealth System.

== History ==
On November 1, 1843, under President George Edmond Pierce, five faculty members including Jared Potter Kirtland and John Delamater, and sixty-seven students began the first medical lectures at the Medical Department of Western Reserve College (also known as the Cleveland Medical College) in Hudson, Ohio. Kirtland and Delamater had previously been instructors at a medical college started in 1834, the Medical Department of Willoughby University of Lake Erie, which had closed in 1843 due to faculty disagreements. Other faculty from that Medical Department went on to found Willoughby Medical College of Columbus, a precursor to the Ohio State University College of Medicine.

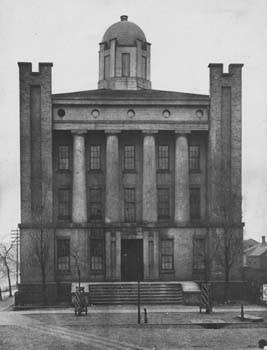
Medical Department of Western Reserve College 1843-1885 located at E. 9th and St. Clair.

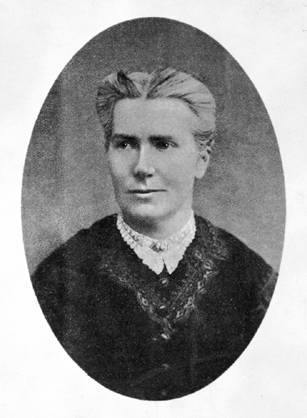
Emily Blackwell – 1854 MD alumna. CaseMed graduated six of the first seven women to receive U.S. medical degrees.

=== Women in Medicine ===
In 1852, the medical school became the second in the U.S. to graduate a woman, Nancy Talbot Clark. 1854 MD alumna, Emily Blackwell became the third woman in the US to receive a regular medical degree. Six of the first seven women in the United States to receive medical degrees from recognized allopathic medical schools graduated from Western Reserve University between 1850 and 1856, which included Marie Zakrzewska.

=== Flexner Report ===
In 1909, Abraham Flexner surveyed and evaluated each of the 155 medical schools then extant in North America, with his results published the following year in what came to be known as the Flexner Report. The results proved shocking: most "medical schools," for example, had entrance requirements no more stringent than either high school diploma or "rudiments or the recollection of a common school education."

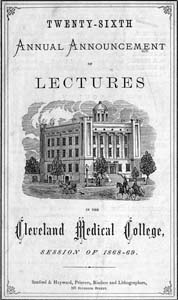
Cover of the Medical School catalog of 1868–69.

Only sixteen schools required at least two years of college as an entrance requirement, and of these, Johns Hopkins, Harvard, and Western Reserve were the only schools to require an undergraduate degree. Although Johns Hopkins represented his ideal, Flexner also singled out the Medical Department of Western Reserve University for its praiseworthy admission standards and facilities. Flexner referred to Western Reserve as "already one of the substantial schools in the country." In a letter to Western Reserve president Charles Franklin Thwing he said, "The Medical Department of Western Reserve University is, next to Johns Hopkins..., the best in the country."

=== Western Reserve curriculum ===
A little over 40 years later, in 1952, the Western Reserve University School of Medicine revolutionized medical education with the "new curriculum of 1952" and more advanced stages in 1968. This was the most progressive medical curriculum in the country at that time, integrating the basic and clinical sciences. L. O. Krampitz chaired the subcommittee which implemented the curriculum reform.

=== Health Education Campus ===
In 2019, the School of Medicine relocated to the Samson Pavilion Health Education Campus on the campus of the Cleveland Clinic, a $515 million building project, amid a multi-million dollar joint fundraising campaign between CWRU and the Cleveland Clinic. The campus houses students Case Western Reserve School of Medicine (CCLCM and traditional MD programs), Frances Payne Bolton School of Nursing and Case School of Dental Medicine, all of which—with the exception of CCLCM—had previously held classes on the campus of CWRU and University Hospitals Cleveland Medical Center. The move, announced in 2013, was a major contributing factor for University Hospitals to shift its name from University Hospitals Case Medical Center to University Hospitals Cleveland Medical Center in 2016, as well as renegotiate its affiliation agreement with CWRU that same year.

== Academics ==
Prospective students have the option of three degree paths leading to a medical degree at the School of Medicine: the University Program, the College Program, or the Medical Scientist Training Program.

=== University Program ===
The University Program is a traditional four-year Doctor of Medicine program designed to train well-rounded physicians in a curriculum called the Western Reserve2 (WR2) which is built on four cornerstones of clinical mastery, research and scholarship, leadership, and civic professionalism to prepare students for the ongoing practice of evidence-based medicine in the rapidly changing healthcare environment of the 21st century. The goal of this program is to challenge students so that they affect positive change through treating disease, promoting health, and understanding the social and behavioral context of illness. The four-year curriculum unites the disciplines of medicine and public health into a single, integrated program that trains future physicians to consider the interplay between the biology of disease and the social and behavioral context of illness, between the care of the individual patient and the health of the public, and between clinical medicine and population medicine.

=== Cleveland Clinic Lerner College of Medicine ===
The Cleveland Clinic Lerner College of Medicine (CCLCM) is an educational program within the CWRU School of Medicine administered in conjunction with Cleveland Clinic. The program is five years, including a dedicated year for research. The Cleveland Clinic established the school in 2002 with a $100 million gift from Norma and Al Lerner, and CCLCM accepted its first class of students in 2004. Physician researcher Eric Topol played an important role in securing the donation from the Lerner family. Topol served as Provost and Chief Academic Officer at CCLCM until 2006, when his position was eliminated amid controversy regarding his criticism of Vioxx and disagreements with other Cleveland Clinic leaders, including then-CEO Toby Cosgrove.

The class size each year is 32 students, and the curriculum is notable for its lack of class rank, pre-clinical or clinical grading, or end-of-course examinations. In 2008, Cleveland Clinic announced that all students entering the program would receive full-tuition scholarships, representing the first medical school program in the United States not to charge students tuition. The Cleveland Clinic, rather than CWRU, is responsible for all financial aspects of the school. Administration of the school, including deans, administrative staff, and admissions, is separate from the School of Medicine, which provides oversight over academic affairs at CCLCM.

=== Medical Scientist Training Program ===
The Medical Scientist Training Program awards MD and PhD degrees upon graduation. Case Western Reserve University School of Medicine was the first medical school to offer the dual degree MD-PhD program to its students in 1956, nearly a decade before the National Institutes of Health developed the first Medical Scientist Training Program.

In 2002, the School of Medicine became the third institution in history to receive the highest review possible from the body that grants accreditation to U.S. and Canadian medical degree programs, the Liaison Committee on Medical Education.

=== Primary Teaching Hospitals ===
In 1896, the first affiliation agreement was approved between Western Reserve University and University Hospitals of Cleveland

- University Hospitals Cleveland Medical Center
  - Rainbow Babies & Children's Hospital
  - UH Seidman Cancer Center
  - UH MacDonald Women's Hospital
- Cleveland Clinic
- MetroHealth
- Louis Stokes Cleveland Department of Veterans Affairs Medical Center

==== Other teaching affiliates ====
- St. Vincent Charity Hospital
- Circle Health Services

== Student life ==
=== Academic Societies ===
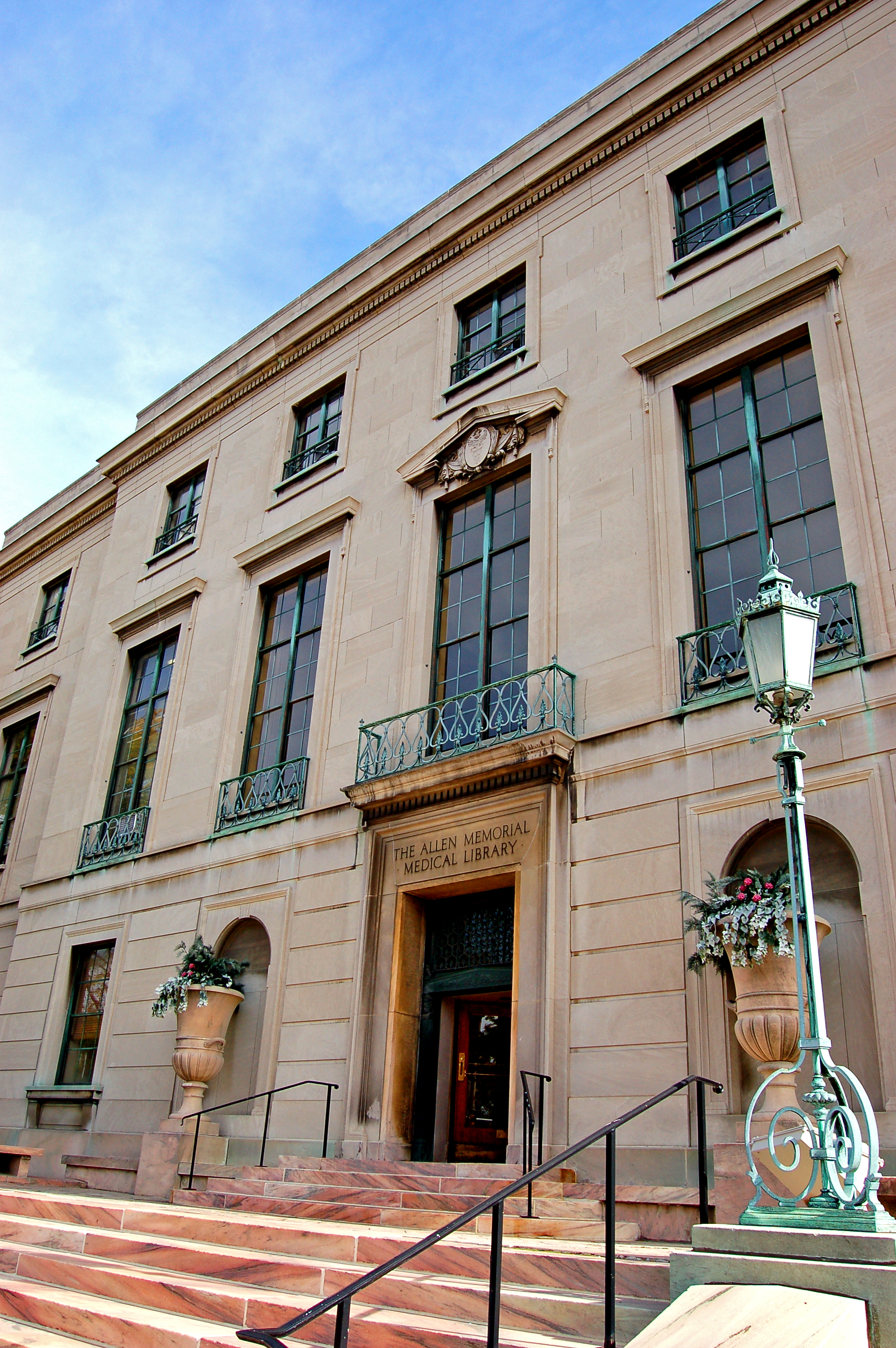
Allen Memorial Medical Library

The CWRU School of Medicine School is divided into six societies named after famous CaseMed alums. Upon matriculation, students in the University Program and MSTP are assigned to a society. Each has a Society Dean who serves as an academic and career adviser to the students. The societies are:

- Frederick C. Robbins Society
- Emily Blackwell-Elizabeth McKinley Society
- David Satcher Society
- Joseph Wearn Society
- H. Jack Geiger Society
- Julie Gerberding Society

Every year, the six societies compete in "ISC Picnic" for the infamous Society Cup in a series of events (e.g. soccer, flag football, relay races etc.).

=== Doc Opera ===
Every year, students at Case Western Reserve SOM write, direct and perform a full-length musical parody, lampooning Case Western Reserve, their professors, and themselves. It is a tradition that began in the 1980s and in recent years, the show has been a benefit for the Student Run Health Clinic.

== Role in Cleveland and Ohio ==
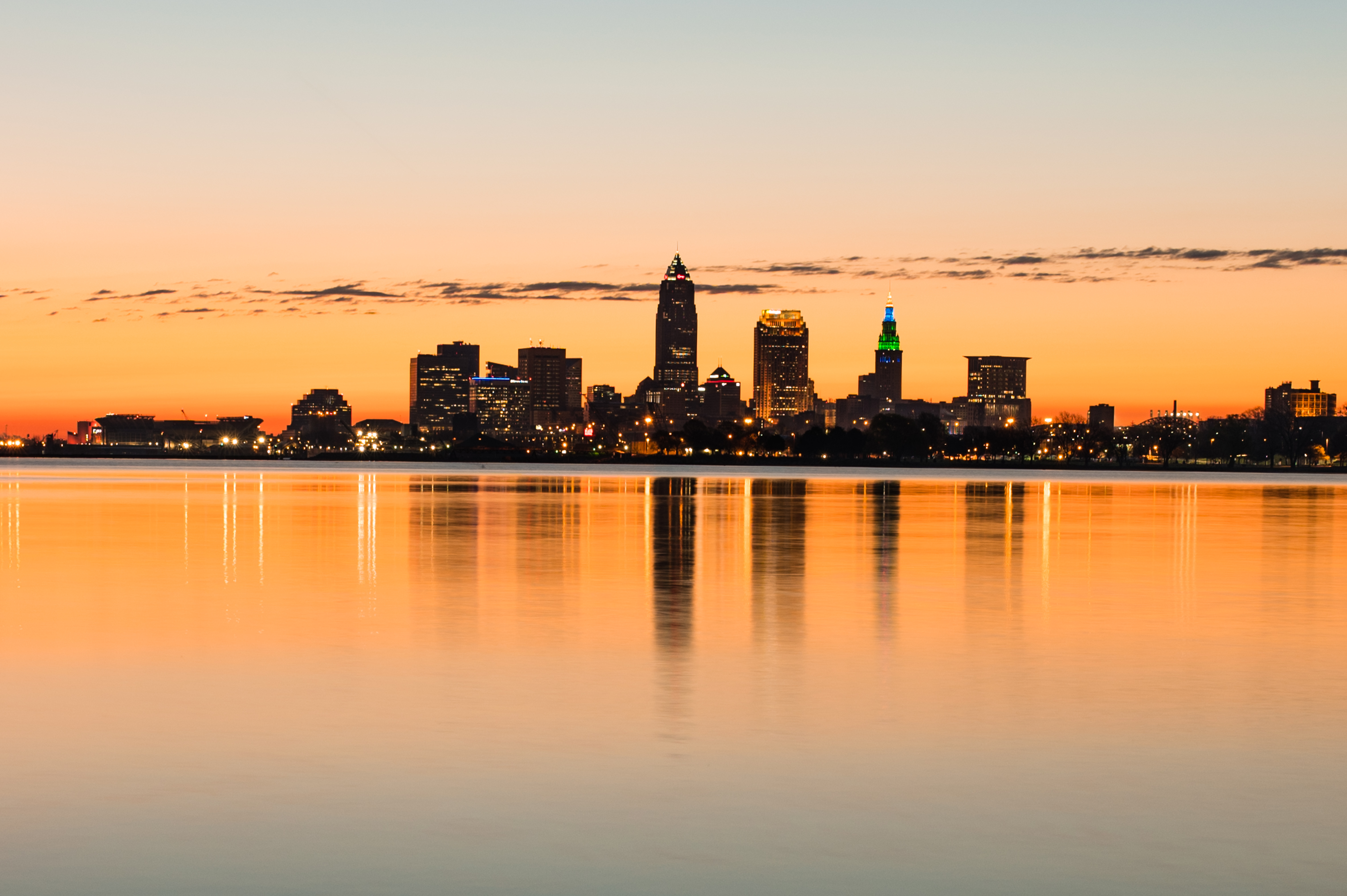
CaseMed is located 15 minutes from downtown Cleveland.

During 2007, the economic impact of the School of Medicine and its affiliates on the State of Ohio equaled $5.82 billion and accounted for more than 65,000 Ohio jobs. The role of Case Western Reserve University in the Cleveland economy has been reported on by The Economist magazine.

== Cleveland Free-Net ==
In 1984, Dr. Thomas Grundner, an assistant professor at Case Western’s Department of Family Medicine, and others created a free medical bulletin board system to connect people with healthcare professionals, named St. Silicon's Hospital and Information Dispensary. By 1986, St. Silicon's Hospital became Cleveland Free-Net. On 30 September 1999 Cleveland Free-Net closed.

== Notable alumni and faculty ==
=== 1800s ===
- John A. Rice (1851 MD alumnus) - member of the Wisconsin State Senate.
- Nancy Talbot Clark (1852 MD alumna) - second woman in the United States to earn a medical degree.†
- Emily Blackwell (1854 MD alumna) - third woman in the United States to earn a medical degree and the sister of Elizabeth Blackwell, the first woman in the United States to earn a medical degree.†
- Cordelia A. Greene (1855 MD alumna) - founder, Castile Sanitarium; benefactor, Cordelia A. Greene Library.†
- Marie Elizabeth Zakrzewska (1856 MD alumna) - founder of the New England Hospital for Women and Children (known today as The Dimock Center).
- Shaw Loo (1867 MD alumnus) - the first Western-trained Burmese physician.
- George Washington Crile (1887 MD alumnus) - Performed first blood transfusion. Established Lakeside Hospital of what is now University Hospitals Case Medical Center, and later co-founded Cleveland Clinic. Crile was a graduate of Wooster Medical College which merged to form modern day CaseMed.

†Six of the first seven women in the United States to receive medical degrees from recognized allopathic medical schools graduated from Western Reserve University (as it was called then) between 1850 and 1856.

=== 1900s ===
- Matthew N. Levy (1945 MD alumnus), Professor of Physiology, co-author of Berne & Levy's Principles of Physiology
- Theodor Kolobow (1958 MD alumnus), NIH researcher and inventor of the spiral coil membrane lung
- Jane Pringle (1971 MD), politician
- Emelia Benjamin (1983 MD alumna) - Professor, researcher, and international expert on the epidemiology of atrial fibrillation

=== Nobel laureates ===
John Macleod, 1923 Nobel Prize winner for discovering insulin and Western Reserve University Professor of Physiology, teaching class.

==== Alumni ====
- 1958 - Arthur Bankhurst (1958 BS), Distinguished professor at the University of New Mexico
- 1980 - Paul Berg (1952 PhD in Biochemistry alumnus), Nobel Prize in Chemistry for pioneering research in recombinant DNA technology.

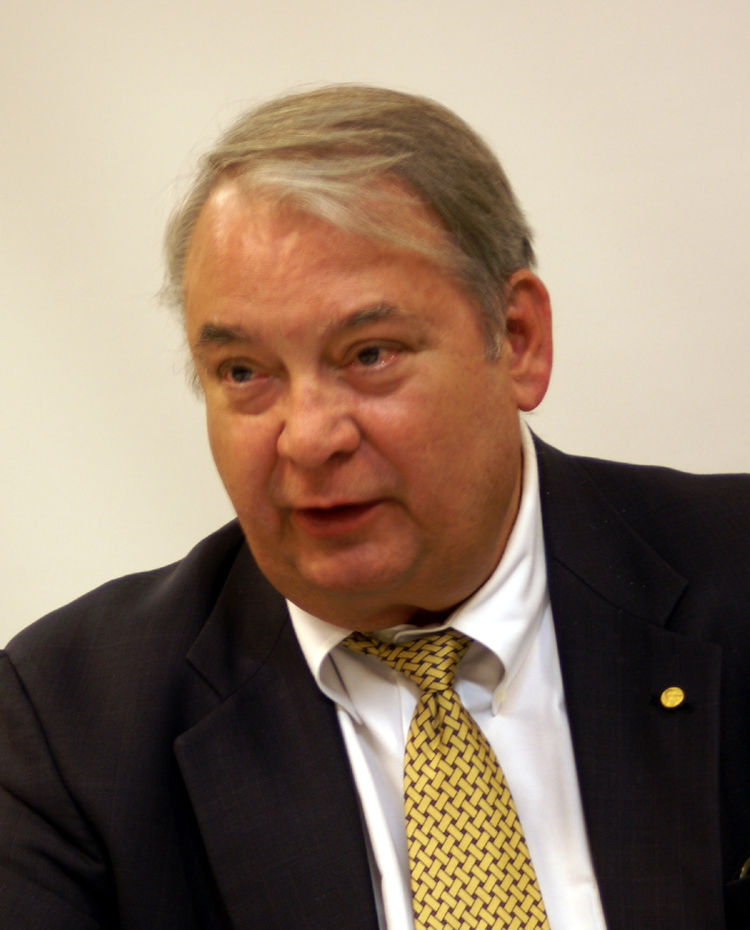
Ferid Murad, 1998 Nobel Laureate and CaseMed MD-PhD alumnus.

- 1985 & 1997 - H. Jack Geiger (1958 MD alumnus), Though not a recipient of Nobel prize directly, he was the founding member and past president of Physicians for Human Rights which shared the 1997 Nobel Peace Prize as part of International Campaign to Ban Landmines. He also was a founding member of Physicians for Social Responsibility which shared the 1985 Nobel Peace Prize as part of International Physicians for the Prevention of Nuclear War.
- 1994 - Alfred G. Gilman (1969 MD-PhD alumnus), Nobel Prize in Physiology or Medicine for co-discovery of G proteins
- 1998 - Ferid Murad (1965 MD-PhD alumnus), Nobel Prize in Physiology or Medicine for role in the discovery of nitric oxide in cardiovascular signaling
- 2003 - Peter Agre (1978 Internal Medicine alumnus), Nobel Prize in Chemistry for discovering Aquaporins that transport salts and water into and out of cells, leading to a better understanding of many diseases of the kidney, heart, muscles and nervous system.

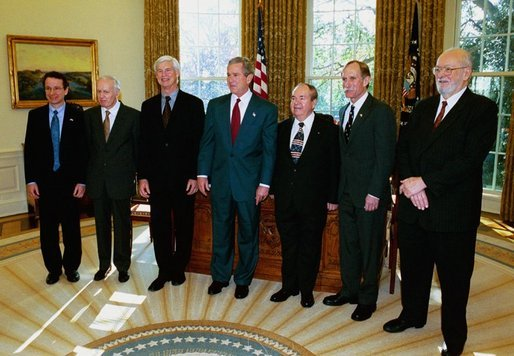
Case alumni who received 2003 Nobel Prizes - Paul C. Lauterbur and Peter Agre (1st and 2nd from right) with President George Walker Bush

==== Faculty ====
- 1923 - John Macleod (Professor of Physiology), Nobel Prize in Physiology or Medicine, for discovery of Insulin
- 1938 - Corneille Heymans, Nobel Prize in Physiology or Medicine for work on carotid sinus reflex
- 1954 - Frederick C. Robbins (Dean of CaseMed), Nobel Prize in Physiology or Medicine, for work on polio virus, which led to development of polio vaccines; past president of the Institute of Medicine of the National Academy of Sciences.
- 1971 - Earl W. Sutherland (Chair of Pharmacology), Nobel Prize in Physiology or Medicine, for establishing identity and importance of cyclic adenosine monophosphate or cyclic AMP in regulation of cell metabolism. Sutherland discovered cAMP while at CaseMed.
- 1988 - George H. Hitchings, Nobel Prize in Physiology or Medicine, for research leading to development of drugs to treat leukemia, organ transplant rejection, gout, herpes virus, and AIDS-related bacterial and pulmonary infections.

=== Public health ===
- Sidney Katz (1948 MD alumnus) - Pioneering American physician, scientist, educator, author, and public servant. Most noted for creating the first Activities of Daily Living (ADL) Scale
- Jesse Leonard Steinfeld (1949 MD alumnus) - U.S. Surgeon General (1969 to 1973), most noted for achieving widespread fluoridation of water, requiring prescription drugs to be effective, and strengthening the Surgeon General's Warning on cigarettes.
- David Satcher (1970 MD-PhD alumnus) - U.S. Surgeon General under President Bill Clinton, and first African-American director of the Centers for Disease Control and Prevention
- Julie L. Gerberding (1981 MD alumnus) - first woman director of the Centers for Disease Control and Prevention
- Michael Ehlert (2007 MD alumnus) - 2007-08 National President of the American Medical Student Association.
- John Brockman (2012 MD alumnus) - 2010-11 National President of the American Medical Student Association.

=== Other ===
- 1927 - Immunologist Enrique Ecker discovered the cause of ptomaine food poisoning and development of an antiserum.
- 1935 - Claude Beck (Surgery residency alumnus; 1924-1971 Professor of Cardiovascular Surgery - first such position in US) -
  - Performed first surgical treatment of coronary artery disease (1935)
  - Performed first defibrillation using machine he built with James Rand (1947)
  - Developed concept of Beck's Triad
  - Started the first CPR teaching course for medical professionals (1950).
- 1997 - Team led by Professor Huntington Willard (Chair of Genetics) create world's first artificial human chromosome.
- M. Scott Peck (1963 MD alumnus) - psychiatrist and author of The Road Less Traveled
- Peter Tippett (1983 MD-PhD alumnus) - Inventor of early anti-virus software.
- Alfredo Palacio (Internal Medicine alumnus) - President of Ecuador (2005–2007).
- David Jenkins- won the men's gold medal for figure skating during the 1960 Winter Olympics in Squaw Valley, California
- Renee Salas – emergency medicine physician known for her work on climate change
- Peter Pronovost - intensive care physician known for his work on patient safety
- Thomas Wingate Todd, Professor of Anatomy

== See also ==
- List of Case Western people
- Case School of Dental Medicine
