= Elizabeth Gordon =

Elizabeth Gordon may refer to:

- Elizabeth Gordon, Heiress of Gordon (died 1439), progenitress of the Gordon Earls and Marquesses of Huntly
- Elizabeth Gordon, Countess of Huntly, Scottish noblewoman
- Elizabeth Gordon, 19th Countess of Sutherland (1765–1839), Scottish peeress, involved in the Highland Clearances
- Elizabeth Gordon, Duchess of Gordon (1794–1864), Scottish noblewoman and religious figure
- Elisabeth Gordon Chandler (1913–2006), american sculptor
- Liz Gordon (politician) (Elizabeth Audrey Gordon, born 1955), former New Zealand politician
- Betty Gordon, a series of books
- Liz Gordon (tennis) (Elizabeth Gordon Ford, born 1957), South African tennis player
- Elizabeth Gordon (editor) (1906–2000), editor of House Beautiful magazine
- Elizabeth Putnam Gordon (1851–1933), American temperance advocate, author, and editor
- Elizabeth Gordon Fox (1884–1958), American Red Cross nurse

== See also ==
- Gordon (surname)
- Bette Gordon (born 1950), American filmmaker and professor
