= Martin A. Samuels =

American neurologist and medical educator (1945–2023)

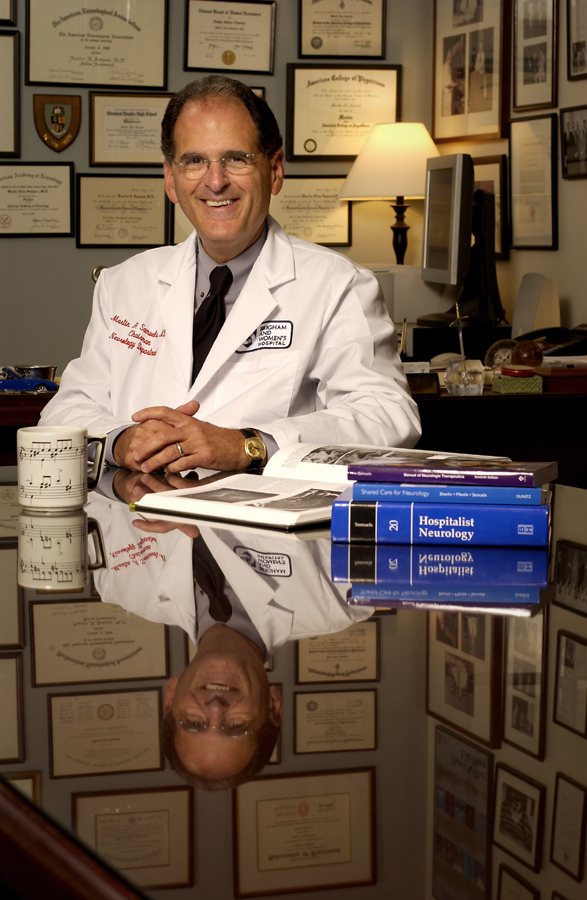
- Born: June 24, 1945; Cleveland, Ohio
- Died: June 6, 2023 (aged 77)
- Education: Williams College; University of Cincinnati College of Medicine
- Medical career
- Profession: Physician, neurologist and medical educator.

Martin A. Samuels (June 24, 1945 – June 6, 2023) was an American physician, neurologist, and medical educator. His work was characterized by a holistic approach to medicine, emphasizing the interconnectedness of neurology with other bodily systems. He conducted research in neuroradiology, rheumatology and neuropathology, exploring the complex interactions between the nervous system and other physiological processes.

== Early life and education ==
Born in Cleveland, Ohio, on June 24, 1945, Martin A. Samuels attended Cleveland Heights High School. During his time there, he served as president of the student body and graduated with honors. In recognition of his achievements, he was later inducted into the Cleveland Heights High School Hall of Fame.

Samuels credited his childhood pediatrician, Dr. J.W. Epstein, with inspiring his future career in medicine. He recalled the house calls made by Dr. Epstein, describing them as a "very romanticized version of what a doctor was supposed to be." Samuels admired Dr. Epstein's gentle and reassuring manner, which left a lasting impression on him. In a 2009 interview, Samuels shared that he asked Dr. Epstein, "Can you continue to take care of me now that I'm not a child anymore?" to which Dr. Epstein replied, "I'll take care of you until you're a doctor."

Additionally, before entering medical school, Samuels was introduced to the field of medicine and specifically to the brain-heart connection through his cousin, Matthew Levy, a cardiovascular physiologist at Mount Sinai Hospital and Case Western Reserve Medical School.

Samuels received his Bachelor of Arts degree in biology from Williams College in 1967. In 1971 he received his Doctor of Medicine degree from the University of Cincinnati College of Medicine. There he was elected to the Pi Kappa Epsilon Honor Society. Samuels received an honorary Doctor of Science degree from the University of Cincinnati and an honorary Master of Arts degree from Harvard University in 1993.

He spent a period of time focusing on hepatology and immunology research with Sheila Sherlock at the Royal Free Hospital in London. The work resulted in his first scientific publication in Gut, showing that a serum factor present in patients with primary biliary cirrhosis was responsible for the autoimmune nature of the disease.

Following medical school, Samuels completed a residency in internal medicine at the Boston City Hospital, serving as the medical chief resident in 1974–1975, as a junior resident in neurology (1973–1974), a fellow in neuropathology (1975–1976), and a senior resident in neurology (1976–1977) at the Massachusetts General Hospital. Samuels was board certified in both internal medicine and neurology.

== Clinical career ==
Following his training, Samuels became chief of the West Roxbury Veterans Administration Medical Center. After a merger, he was also chief of neurology at the Brockton-West Roxbury VA Medical Center.

In 1988, Samuels was recruited to the Brigham and Women's Hospital to create a Department of Neurology. In 1994, the department was formally instituted, with Samuels as its founding chair.

== Major research and publications ==
Samuels has studied and written on the interface between neurology and the rest of medicine, including neuroradiology, rheumatology, hepatology, nephrology, hematology, and the neurological aspects of organ transplantation and acid-base and electrolyte disturbances. His most well-known contributions relate to the mechanisms and prevention of neurogenic cardiac disease.

Samuels studied "voodoo death," or death caused by fright or intense emotion, which triggers a series of neuro-physiological changes through high levels of catecholamines. He proposed a hypothesis to explain the mechanisms whereby the nervous system can produce cardiac arrhythmias and myocardial necrosis in a number of clinical contexts, including subarachnoid hemorrhage, intracerebral hemorrhage, cerebral infarction, brain tumor, epilepsy, and psychological stress. This research, the subject of Samuels' lecture "Voodoo Death Revisited: The Modern Lessons of Neuroradiology," earned Samuels the H. Houston Merritt Award, granted every two years by the American Academy of Neurology for clinically relevant research. Samuels has spoken on his research at the Cleveland Clinic Heart-Brain Summit (2006) and the International Academy of Cardiology's World Congress on Heart Disease, where he delivered the H. Jeremy C. Swan Memorial Lecture in 2010.

== Teaching ==
Samuels served on the faculty of Harvard Medical School from 1977, and later as a professor from 1993. He was also the founder and ongoing director of Harvard Medical School postgraduate courses titled "Neurology for the Non-Neurologist" and "Intensive Review of Neurology". He was the longstanding director of the Harvard Longwood Neurology Residency and was the co-founder of the Harvard Partners Neurology Residency. Samuels was the first recipient of the Harvard Medical School Faculty Prize for Excellence in Teaching.

In July 2013, a Harvard Medical School endowed chair was established in Samuels' name. The Martin A. Samuels Professorship in Neurology will be occupied by the future chairs of the Department of Neurology at the Brigham and Women's Hospital.

Samuels delivered lectures such as the Charles D. Aring lecture and the Distinguished Alumni Lecture at his alma mater, the University of Cincinnati College of Medicine. In 2005, he received the College of Medicine's highest honor, the Daniel Drake Medal. In 2007, he served as the Robert B. Aird Visiting professor of neurology at the University of California, San Francisco. He delivered the J. Norman Allen Lectureship at the Ohio State University Department of Neurology in 2008 and the Dewey Ziegler Lectureship at the University of Kansas in 2010.

In 2012, he served as the Stephens Lecturer and visiting professor at the University of Colorado and as the Charles Rammelkamp Visiting professor at Metropolitan General Hospital - Case Western Reserve School of Medicine in Cleveland, Ohio. In 2013, he served as the Donald Baxter Lecturer and visiting professor at the Montreal Neurological Institute of McGill University, as the Seymour Jotkowitz Visiting Professor and lecturer at the University of Medicine and Dentistry of New Jersey in Newark, and as the William Chambers Visiting Professor and lecturer at Dartmouth Medical School in Hanover, New Hampshire.

In 2014 he served as the Frank and Joan Rothman Visiting professor at Brown University Alpert Medical School in Providence, Rhode Island, and in 2016 and 2017 he served as the Dr. M. Howard Triedman '52 Visiting Professor and lecturer in brain science. In 2016 he served as a visiting professor at the Dr. Stanley Robbins Memorial Lectureship at Brigham and Women's Hospital in Boston, as a visiting professor at the Queen Elizabeth Hospital in Bridgetown, Barbados and as a visiting professor at Université Pierre et Marie Curie, Salpetrière Hospital, Paris, France.

Samuels delivered neurology updates at the annual meeting of the American College of Physicians. One of these presentations was published in the Annals of Internal Medicine. He was a contributor to the national meetings of the emergency physicians (The American College of Emergency Physicians), the family physicians (The American Academy of Family Physicians) and the American College of Rheumatology. He delivered the Keynote Address at the first Pri-Med conference in Houston, Texas.

Samuels' wrote:- The Manual of Neurological Therapeutics (nine editions), Office Practice of Neurology (two editions), Adams and Victor's Principles of Neurology, Shared Care in Neurology, and Hospitalist Neurology.

== Personal life and death ==
Samuels lived in Boston with his wife, Susan F. Pioli, a longtime medical publisher. He had two children with his previous wife, Linda Samuels.

He died on June 6, 2023. He was survived by his wife, a sister (Carole Bilger), his two children (Marilyn Sommers and Charles Samuels), and three grandchildren.
