= Matthew N. Levy =

American physiologist

Matthew Nathan Levy (December 2, 1922 – March 19, 2012) was an American physiologist best known for his research on cardiac physiology and co-writing several textbooks with Robert M. Berne. Levy carried out pioneering research on the relationship between the heart and the autonomic nervous system and was sometimes referred to as "the father of neurocardiology".

== Early life ==
Levy was born in 1922 and raised in Washington Heights, Manhattan. In 1938, his family moved to Miami and then Cleveland, where he began his premedical education at Case Western Reserve University. He was accepted into the university's medical school in 1942 and began working in the laboratory of cardiovascular physiologist Carl J. Wiggers. He graduated in 1945 and served for two years in the Armed Forces at the Veterans' Administration Hospital in Chillicothe, Ohio.

== Career ==
In 1948, Levy returned to Case Western Reserve University, where he continued to work in Wiggers' laboratory and lectured in physiology. When Wiggers retired in 1953, Levy moved to Albany, New York, to continue his research under the supervision of Wiggers' son, who was a professor at Albany Medical College. He joined the college faculty and became an associate professor of medicine before moving back to Cleveland in 1957 to settle in University Heights with his wife and children. There, he joined St. Vincent Charity Medical Center as the director of the hospital's research division. He rejoined the faculty of Case Western Reserve University and eventually became a professor of physiology. He served as Chief of Investigational Medicine at Mount Sinai Hospital from 1967 until the hospital's closure in 1996.

In the early 1960s, Levy and Robert M. Berne—another physiology researcher whom Levy had met in Wiggers' laboratory—rewrote the physiology curriculum for the Case Western Reserve University School of Medicine. The new syllabus provided the foundation for Cardiovascular Physiology, a textbook co-authored by Berne and Levy and dedicated to Wiggers; its first edition was published in 1967 and its ninth and final edition in 2001. Berne and Levy would go on to collaborate on two more widely used textbooks, Physiology and Principles of Physiology, the later of which is still in publication.

Levy has been referred to as "the father of neurocardiology" for his pioneering research on the relationship between the heart and the autonomic nervous system. Some of his studies specifically examined how the reflexes of the cardiovascular system influence cardiac output and vascular resistance, how the body maintains flow to different circulations, how the vagus nerve affects various functions of the heart, the causes of Wenckebach heart block, and the effect of neuropeptide Y on the heart. Over his career, Levy published more than 220 journal articles and was the editor-in-chief of the American Journal of Physiology's subjournal Heart and Circulatory Physiology. He received numerous awards, including a merit award from the National Institutes of Health and the Carl J. Wiggers Award from the American Physiological Society's cardiovascular branch. He was also inducted into the Cleveland Medical Hall of Fame.

== Retirement and death ==
Levy became a professor emeritus in 1993 but continued to work at Mount Sinai Hospital and MetroHealth Medical Center. After retiring he continued to edit new editions of his and Berne's textbooks. He died on March 19, 2012, at Hillcrest Hospital in Cleveland.
