= Arthur Bankhurst =

American reumatologist (1937–2026)

- Born: Arthur Dale Bankhurst; July 21, 1937; Cleveland, Ohio, U.S.
- Died: January 18, 2026 (aged 88)
- Education: Massachusetts Institute of Technology; Case Western Reserve University School of Medicine
- Occupation: Rheumatologist
- Spouse: Lois Hall (m. 1969)

Arthur Dale Bankhurst (July 21, 1937 – January 18, 2026) was an American rheumatologist.

== Early life and career ==
Bankhurst was born in Cleveland, Ohio on July 21, 1937, the son of John William and Daisy Howard Bankhurst. At an early age, he worked as a newspaper delivery boy. He attended Massachusetts Institute of Technology, completing his undergraduate education in 1958. After graduating, he attended Case Western Reserve University School of Medicine, earning his MD degree in 1962, which after earning his degree, he completed his clinical training at the University Hospital of Cleveland, and served as a lieutenant in the United States Navy for two years.

Bankhurst served as a professor in the department of medicine at the University of New Mexico from 1979 to 2015. During his years as a professor, in 2015, he was named a distinguished professor.

== Personal life and death ==
In 1969, Bankhurst married Lois Hall. Their marriage ended with Bankhurst's death in 2026.

Bankhurst died on January 18, 2026, at the age of 88.
