= Chester Hamlin Werkman =

American microbiologist

Chester Hamlin Werkman (June 17, 1893, Fort Wayne, Indiana – September 10, 1962, Ames, Iowa) was an American microbiologist. He is known as one of the pioneers of understanding and reconstructing the enzymatic processes involved in bacterial metabolic processes.

== Biography ==
After completing secondary school in Fort Wayne, he briefly worked for a railroad company. He then matriculated at Purdue University, where he graduated in 1919 with a B.S. in chemistry. In 1919, for a few months, he did routine research for the Food and Drug Administration in the Department of Agriculture. In September 1919 he became a chemistry instructor at the University of Idaho. In September 1920 he became a graduate student in the bacteriology department of Iowa State University. There in 1923 he received his doctorate with dissertation Immunologic Significance of Vitamins under the supervision of Robert Earle Buchanan. For the academic year 1924–1925 Werkman was an assistant professor in microbiology at the University of Massachusetts. At Iowa State University, he was from 1925 to 1927 an assistant professor, from 1927 to 1933 an associate professor, and from 1933 to retirement a full professor. From 1945 until retirement, he was the head of the bacteriology department, but a number of his colleagues considered his control of the department "petty and autocratic".

Influenced by Albert Jan Kluyver, Werkman directed Iowa State's microbiological department toward biochemical methods, which before Werkman's influence was somewhat more oriented toward botany and zoology. In his laboratory he worked with several noteworthy researchers over the years, including Lester O. Krampitz and Merton F. Utter (both of whom were his doctoral students). Working with Harland G. Wood in 1936 led to an outstanding result, when it was discovered that some bacteria (of the genus Propionibacterium) can utilize CO_{2} as chemotrophs. Wood and Werkman's work followed pioneering research by Cornelis Bernardus van Niel in Kluyver's laboratory.

In 1944 he was awarded an honorary doctorate by Purdue University. In 1946 he was elected a member of the United States National Academy of Sciences.

He married Cecile Baker in 1913. Their son Robert Theodore Werkman (1915–2012) became a chemical engineer and a U.S. Army captain, who participated in the Battle of the Bulge.

== Selected publications ==
- Sunderlin, Gertrude; Werkman, C. H. (1928). "Synthesis of Vitamin B by Microörganisms". Journal of Bacteriology. 16 (1): 17–33. doi:10.1128/jb.16.1.17-33.1928. PMC 375004. PMID 16559315.
- Werkman, C. H.; Gillen, G. F. (1932). "Bacteria producing trimethylene glycol". Journal of Bacteriology. 23 (2): 167–182. doi:10.1128/jb.23.2.167-182.1932. PMC 533311. PMID 16559543.
- Osburn, O. L.; Wood, H. G.; Werkman, C. H. (1933). "Determination of Formic, Acetic, and Propionic Acids in a Mixture". Industrial & Engineering Chemistry Analytical Edition. 5 (4): 247–250. doi:10.1021/ac50084a012.
- Wood, Harland Goff; Werkman, Chester Hamlin (1936). "The utilisation of CO_{2} in the dissimilation of glycerol by the propionic acid bacteria". Biochemical Journal. 30 (1): 48–53. doi:10.1042/bj0300048. PMC 1263358. PMID 16745992.
- Nelson, M. E.; Werkman, C. H. (1935). "Dissimilation of Glucose by Heterofermentative Lactic Acid Bacteria". Journal of Bacteriology. 30 (6): 547–557. doi:10.1128/jb.30.6.547-557.1935. PMC 533708. PMID 16559863.
- Wood, Harland Goff; Werkman, Chester Hamlin (1936). "Mechanism of glucose dissimilation by the propionic acid bacteria". Biochemical Journal. 30 (4): 618–623. doi:10.1042/bj0300618. PMC 1263067. PMID 16746061.
- Wood, Harland Goff; Werkman, Chester Hamlin (1938). "The utilization of CO_{2} by the propionic acid bacteria". Biochemical Journal. 32 (7): 1262–1271. doi:10.1042/bj0321262. PMC 1264178. PMID 16746749.
- Mickelson, Milo; Werkman, C. H. (1938). "Influence of pH on the Dissimilation of Glucose by Aerobacter indologenes". Journal of Bacteriology. 36 (1): 67–76. doi:10.1128/jb.36.1.67-76.1938. PMC 545313. PMID 16560143.
- Silverman, M.; Werkman, C. H. (1939). "Adaptation of the Propionic-Acid Bacteria to Vitamin B_{1} Synthesis Including a Method of Assay". Journal of Bacteriology. 38 (1): 25–32. doi:10.1128/jb.38.1.25-32.1939. PMC 544808. PMID 16560235.
