= Renee Salas =

American medical doctor

- Education: Harvard T.H. Chan School of Public Health; Cleveland Clinic Lerner College of Medicine; Case Western Reserve University, Saint Mary’s College
- Scientific career
- Fields: Emergency Medicine, Climate change and the Health System
- Workplaces: Massachusetts General Hospital; Harvard Medical School; Harvard T.H. Chan School of Public Health

Renee N. Salas is an American medical doctor who is an attending physician in Emergency Medicine at Massachusetts General Hospital, Assistant Professor of Emergency Medicine at the Harvard Medical School, and the Yerby Fellow at the Harvard T.H. Chan School of Public Health. She was previously the Burke Fellow at the Harvard Global Health Institute, where she remains one of the Affiliated Faculty.

Salas leads efforts to make physicians and hospitals become more active in their response to climate change. She was senior author of the 2022 Lancet Countdown on Health and Climate Change U.S. Brief and lead author of previous U.S. Lancet Countdown briefs in 2021, 2020, 2019 and 2018. She has worked with The New England Journal of Medicine both as a co-director for the first Climate Crisis and Clinical Practice Symposium, held in 2020, and as an NEJM guest editor on climate change and health.

Salas serves on the planning committee for the Climate Change and Human Health Initiative of the National Academy of Medicine, and has testified before Congress' House Committee on Oversight and Reform. In 2021 Salas was elected as a Member of the National Academy of Medicine (NAM) for her work on climate change, health and the health care system.

== Early life and education ==
Salas attended Saint Mary's College in Notre Dame, Indiana from which she received a B.S. in biology in 2003 with minors in chemistry and psychology. She then attended the Cleveland Clinic Lerner College of Medicine (CCLCM), a program within the Case Western Reserve University School of Medicine in Cleveland, Ohio. Salas was one of the first group of students to be accepted by the Cleveland Clinic Lerner College of Medicine in its inaugural year in 2004. She earned both an MD and a Master's of Science in Clinical Research from Case Western Reserve University. After graduating, Salas held a residency at the University of Cincinnati, the first program in the country to offer an emergency medicine training program.

Salas started a two-year wilderness medicine fellowship at Massachusetts General Hospital (MGH) in 2013. As part of her fellowship she attended a lecture on climate change, where she first heard that climate change would be the next public health emergency. Up until that point she had never considered that climate change would impact her patients. This lecture made her reconsider her career, shifting her research focus to climate change and its impact on public health. She went on to also earn a master's degree in public health with a concentration in environmental health from the Harvard T.H. Chan School of Public Health in 2016.

In 2015 Salas was awarded a wilderness medicine fellowship and worked as a physician for the Himalayan Rescue Association in the Everest base camp. She was one of very few medical doctors in the vicinity when the 2016 Imphal earthquake struck Nepal, and worked to save the lives of the Sherpas and visiting climbers.

== Research and career ==
In addition to practicing emergency medicine as a physician in the Department of Emergency Medicine at Massachusetts General Hospital and at Harvard Medical School, Salas studies the ways in which climate change is impacting both patients and the healthcare system. She works with health professionals to improve climate education, practice, research, and advocacy, to foster resilience, preparedness and effective leadership. When asked about the impact of climate change on the medical system, Salas remarked, "A climate lens must be added to every aspect of our practice. Speaking as an emergency medicine physician, that includes everything from ambulance and triage protocols to the screening tools we use. It also impacts how we treat patients, the discharge instructions we provide, and the follow-up plans".

Salas emphasizes that climate change is a "metaproblem" which underlies many others and a "threat multiplier" which broadly affects the practice of medicine and all facets of work in the medical profession. The many physical effects of climate change include increased heat, extreme weather, sea level rise, air pollution from CO_{2}, ozone, and wildfires. longer pollen seasons and higher levels of pollen in the air, wider dispersal of diseases, and food insecurity. The impacts on people's health include heat-related illness, increased cardiovascular and respiratory difficulties, problems in pregnancy, stress, anxiety, depression, poor nutrition, and increases in water- and vector-borne diseases such as Zika and Lyme. While those who are more vulnerable are more likely to suffer the effects initially (children, the elderly, the poor, those with chronic medical conditions, some racial groups), more and more individuals will be affected as climate change intensifies.

Salas connects these broad issues to the patients she sees in daily practice like the mother whose daughter's asthma worsened due to a combination of heat stress, pollen, and vehicular air pollution. She emphasizes that standard protocols must be adapted to take environmental conditions in which patients live into account during diagnosis and treatment. Some medications may be less effective depending on temperature. Patients who are dealing with extreme living conditions may be less able to respond to standard treatments. Hospitals themselves are increasingly at risk as physical conditions worsen, extreme weather events occur, supply chains are disrupted, and the demands and stresses facing medical personnel increase. For example, during a heat wave in 2018, the power failed at Mount Auburn Hospital. Firefighters had to be called to move patients from the hot rooms at the top of the building.

Despite the clear risks that global warming presents to human health, a survey conducted by the International Federation of Medical Students' Associations revealed that only 16% of medical schools included climate change on their curriculum. Salas founded and served as Chair of the Climate Change and Health special interest group of the Society for Academic Emergency Medicine.

Salas was the lead author of the U.S. Lancet Countdown briefs in 2018, 2019, 2020, and 2021 and the senior author of the 2022 Lancet Countdown on Health and Climate Change U.S. Brief. In February 2020 Salas was one of the co-directors and the keynote speaker of the Climate Crisis and Clinical Practice Symposium at Harvard Medical School, which encouraged clinicians and hospitals to take on a more active role in responding to climate change.

During the COVID-19 pandemic, Salas became concerned that the United States was unprepared to address both COVID-19 and climate change. In an opinion article for The BMJ in 2020 she emphasized three lessons from the COVID pandemic that needed to be applied to the climate crisis. She encouraged health professionals to use their position as trusted sources to promote action; to prioritize prevention; and to respond rapidly, globally, and in a coordinated fashion.

== Awards ==
- 2022, Public Health Leadership Award, Society for Academic Emergency Medicine (SAEM)
- 2022, Early Career Alumnus Award, Alumni Association, Cleveland Clinic Lerner College of Medicine
- 2021, Member, National Academy of Medicine
- 2020, Shannon Scholar, St. Mary's College
- 2020, Early Career Leadership Award, Case Western Reserve University School of Medicine
- 2019, Yerby Fellowship, Harvard T.H. Chan School of Public Health
- 2018, Burke Fellowship, Harvard Global Health Institute
- 2018, Clinician-Teacher Development Award, Massachusetts General Hospital
- 2016, Eleanor and Miles Shore 50th Anniversary Fellowship Program for Scholars in Medicine, Harvard Medical School

== Selected publications ==
- Salas, Renee N. (August 5, 2020). Written Testimony for the House Committee on Oversight and Reform Hearing: "The Devastating Health Impacts of Climate Change" August 5, 2020 Testimony of: Renee N. Salas, MD, MPH, MS..." (PDF). www.congress.gov.
- Salas, Renee N.; Slutzman, Jonathan E.; Sorensen, Cecilia; Lemery, Jay; Hess, Jeremy J. (July 2019). "Climate Change and Health: An Urgent Call to Academic Emergency Medicine". Academic Emergency Medicine. 26 (7): 837–840. doi:10.1111/acem.13657. ISSN 1069-6563. PMID 30408266. S2CID 53237339.
- Salas, Renee N.; Solomon, Caren G. (August 22, 2019). "The Climate Crisis — Health and Care Delivery". New England Journal of Medicine. 381 (8): e13. doi:10.1056/NEJMp1906035. ISSN 0028-4793. PMID 31433915. S2CID 201276100.
- Salas, Renee N. (July 16, 2015). "Humanity, Teamwork, and Art in Post-Earthquake Nepal". New England Journal of Medicine. 373 (3): 205–207. doi:10.1056/NEJMp1506643. ISSN 0028-4793. PMID 26083121.
- Rini, Brian I.; Tamaskar, Ila; Shaheen, Phillip; Salas, Renee; Garcia, Jorge; Wood, Laura; Reddy, Sethu; Dreicer, Robert; Bukowski, Ronald M. (January 3, 2007). "Hypothyroidism in Patients With Metastatic Renal Cell Carcinoma Treated With Sunitinib". JNCI: Journal of the National Cancer Institute. 99 (1): 81–83. doi:10.1093/jnci/djk008. ISSN 0027-8874. PMID 17202116.
