= Robert M. Berne =

American cardiologist

- Born: April 22, 1918
- Died: October 4, 2001 (aged 83)
- Education: University of North Carolina at Chapel Hill; Harvard Medical School
- Scientific career
- Fields: Medicine; Cardiology
- Workplaces: University of Virginia

Robert M. Berne (April 22, 1918 – October 4, 2001) was an American heart specialist and a medical educator whose textbooks were used by generations of physicians.

Berne was recognized widely for his seminal research contributions on the role of adenosine in the blood flow to the heart. He served as the editor of the peer-reviewed journal the Annual Review of Physiology from 1983–1988.

== Awards and Distinctions ==
Berne was the chair and the Founder of cardiovascular research at the University of Virginia as well as the Chair of Department of Physiology there, He was also President of the American Physiological Society. Berne was a member of the National Academy of Sciences, the American Association for the Advancement of Science and the American Academy of Arts and Sciences. Berne was the Editor in Chief of Circulation Research, a publication of the American Heart Association from 1970 to 1975. He received the Gold Heart Award of the American Heart Association in 1985. He also received a special citation from the American Heart Association in 1979. The National Academies Press called Berne "an acclaimed authority in the field of cardiovascular physiology".

== Career and life ==
Berne was born in Yonkers, New York. He graduated from the University of North Carolina at Chapel Hill in 1939, and from Harvard Medical School in 1943. In late 1944 he served in the US Army as a medical officer. At the end of the war he took up a residency in Internal Medicine at Mount Sinai with the focus on cardiology. Berne joined the physiology faculty of Western Reserve University in Cleveland in 1949, and remained in that position for 17 years. In 1966 he was appointed Chair of the Physiology Department at the University of Virginia and served in that capacity until 1988. He published more than 200 scientific articles and three textbooks authored with Matthew N. Levy.

== Notable textbooks ==
- Principles of Physiology
- Cardiovascular Physiology
- Case Studies in Physiology.
