= Robert Earle Buchanan =

Robert Earle Buchanan (March 27, 1883, Cedar Rapids, Iowa – 1973, Ames, Iowa) was an American bacteriologist and a professor and administrator at Iowa State University. He is known for his work on bacterial taxonomy.

== Biography ==
Buchanan grew up on a farm. He graduated in 1904 with a B.S. and in 1906 with an M.S. from Iowa State College (now named Iowa State University). He worked as an undergraduate as a student assistant to Louis Hermann Pammel, whom he accompanied on botanical surveys. He was from 1904 to 1906 as teaching assistant in bacteriology under Pammel. In 1908 Buchanan received his Ph.D. in bacteriology from the University of Chicago. His doctoral dissertation The Morphology of Bacillus Radicicola, written under the supervision of Edwin O. Jordan, deals with nitrogen-fixing bacteria that live in the nodules of a variety of legume species. At Iowa State College, Buchanan was from 1908 to 1909 an associate professor and was appointed in 1909 a full professor. He founded in 1910 the college's department of bacteriology and headed the department until his retirement in 1948. Two important bacteriologists in the early history of the department are Max Levine (1889–1967) and Chester Hamlin Werkman (1893–1962) (who was Buchanan's doctoral student). Buchanan was the dean of Iowa State's Graduate College from 1919 to 1948 and director of the Iowa Agriculture Experiment Station from 1933 to 1945.

Buchanan was elected in 1913 a fellow of the American Association for the Advancement of Science. In 1918 he was the president of the Society of American Bacteriologists (renamed in 1960 the American Society for Microbiology). In 1935 he was the president of the Iowa Academy of Science.

He married Estelle Denis Fogel in 1910. Their son Joseph Hall Buchanan became a patent attorney and a brigadier-general.

== Selected publications ==
=== Articles ===
- Buchanan, R. E. (1918). "Life Phases in a Bacterial Culture". The Journal of Infectious Diseases. 23 (2): 109–125. doi:10.1086/infdis/23.2.109. JSTOR 30084296.
- Buchanan, R. E. (1917). "Studies in the Nomenclature and Classification of the Bacteria Ii. The Primary Subdivisions of the Schizomycetes". Journal of Bacteriology. 2 (2): 155–164. doi:10.1128/jb.2.2.155-164.1917. PMC 378699. PMID 16558735.
- Winslow, C.-E. A.; Broadhurst, Jean; Buchanan, R. E.; Krumwiede, Charles; Rogers, L. A.; Smith, G. H. (1920). "The Families and Genera of the Bacteria Final Report of the Committee of the Society of American Bacteriologists on Characterization and Classification of Bacterial Types". Journal of Bacteriology. 5 (3): 191–229. doi:10.1128/jb.5.3.191-229.1920. PMC 378870. PMID 16558872.
- Fulmer, Ellis I.; Buchanan, R. E. (1923). "Studies on Toxicity". Journal of General Physiology. 6 (1): 77–89. doi:10.1085/jgp.6.1.77. PMC 2140618. PMID 19872053.
- Buchanan, R. E. (1955). "Taxonomy". Annual Review of Microbiology. 9: 1–20. doi:10.1146/annurev.mi.09.100155.000245. PMID 13259458.
- Buchanan, R. E. (1966). "History and Development of the American Type Culture Collection". The Quarterly Review of Biology. 41 (2): 101–104. doi:10.1086/404936. PMID 5946752. S2CID 32609060.

=== Books ===
- Buchanan, Robert Earle (1916). Veterinary bacteriology.
- ——— (1921). Agricultural and Industrial Bacteriology.
- ——— (1925). General Systematic Bacteriology: History, Nomenclature, Groups of Bacteria.
