= Annah G. Pettee =

American politician (1874–1959)

Annah Greene Pettee

Member of the Colorado House of Representatives
- In office 1927–1930

Personal details
- Born: Annah Taft Greene; August 3, 1874 Pike, New York, U.S.
- Died: June 13, 1959 (aged 84) Denver, Colorado, U.S.
- Party: Republican
- Spouse: William Nelson Pettee
- Relations: Cordelia A. Greene (aunt)
- Children: 5
- Education: Elmira College

Annah Taft Greene Pettee (née Annah Taft Greene; August 3, 1874 – June 13, 1959) was an American state legislator in Colorado. A Republican, she served from 1927 to 1930 and represented Denver County.

An advertisement for her and other candidates ran in 1925 in Colorado Manufacturer and Consumer. She, Helen Beatty Noland, and Kittie Brighton sponsored a bill in 1929 to allow physicians to provide information on birth control.

Her paternal aunt was Cordelia A. Greene, the founder and director of the Castile Sanitarium in Castile, New York.
