= Voodoo death =

Sudden death brought about by a strong emotional shock, such as fear

Voodoo death, also known as psychogenic death or psychosomatic death, is the phenomenon of sudden death as brought about by strong emotional shock such as fear. The anomaly is recognized as "psychosomatic" in that death is caused by an emotional response—often fear—to some suggested outside force. Voodoo death is observed in native societies, and concentration camps or prisoner of war camps, but the condition is not specific to any particular culture.

== Cannon's work ==
In 1942, Walter Bradford Cannon, a forerunner of modern physiological psychology, published a work postulating that fear could cause a person's physical condition to deteriorate under psychological distress. Citing examples of extraordinary deaths (and their extraneous circumstances) in aboriginal societies, Cannon posited that fear of supernatural consequences to broken societal taboos caused some deaths witnessed among the natives. What Cannon described has since been termed "bone-pointing syndrome", wherein an individual receives some sort of shock—often the breaking of a social/religious taboo—that he interprets as an ill omen for himself; his physical condition then deteriorates at a rapid rate, and he dies within a period as short as 24 hours after the initial shock.

Cannon discussed a Māori woman who learned that the fruit she had eaten came from a tapu (taboo) place; less than 24 hours later she was dead. Conversely, Cannon also shared the example of a young man who had fallen ill when the local witch doctor had pointed a bone at him, a societal taboo that meant a curse of death; however, when the perpetrator explained to the young man that the whole thing had been a mistake, and that no bone had been pointed at him at all, the young man's health returned instantly. Cannon noted the similarities in each case: the individuals were both members of a society where beliefs in the supernatural are fiercely upheld, and both had suffered what they both believed to be some form of a curse as dictated within their personal beliefs; also, the individuals shared similar physical symptoms. And yet, in the case of the young man, once the cause for the psychological distress was removed, his mysterious illness disappeared. Cannon attributed these drastic physical repercussions to the workings of fear upon the mind which then leads to destruction of the physical condition.

== Causes ==
=== Cannon's explanation ===
According to Cannon, the emotion of fear working on the mind, which he terms the "sympathetic" or "sympathico-adrenal" division of the nervous system, causes a fall in blood pressure as brought on by "a reduction of the volume of circulating blood". Cannon explains the loss of blood volume by the constant injection of adrenaline into the small arterioles which constrict, preventing a proper flow of blood within the body and causing a drop in blood pressure. From there, the weak blood pressure prevents the sufficient circulation of the blood by damaging the heart and nerves responsible for the maintenance of the vessels which transport blood, thus making it harder for circulation to continue since the very organs necessary to maintain proper blood circulation are deteriorating. An accelerated heart rate then ensues, followed by rapid breathing. Added to these symptoms are the effects of no food or water in the person experiencing psychological distress: Cannon suggests that true shock, in the medical sense, could be the cause of death as a result of little food or water. States Cannon: "The combination of lack of food and water, anxiety, very rapid pulse and respiration, associated with a shocking experience having persistent effects, would fit well with fatal conditions reported from primitive tribes."

=== Modern explanations ===
Since 1942, scientists have discovered many more of the processes involved in the effect of stress upon the body, such as the region of the brain called the amygdala. The series of events by which a sensory stimulus is introduced to the mind, and the amygdala processes the emotion of fear which follows is called the "vision-to-fear pathway", or the "auditory-to-fear pathway", depending on the stimulus. The generally recognized sequence of events, as enumerated by Esther M. Sternberg, MD, in 2002, stands as follows: various chemicals and electrical impulses are released that are transmitted by nerve fibers. Simultaneously, hormones are excreted from the brain, adrenal and pituitary glands in response to stress on the system. Cardiac arrhythmias are often the result of an overabundance of these hormones on the system.

In 1981, Wylie Vale, PhD, discovered corticotrophin, the brain's hypothalamic stress hormone, or CRH: this hormone secreted by the hypothalamus coordinates with "the brain stem adrenaline centers involved in initiation of the sympathetic response ... to cause a massive release of both adrenaline-like nerve chemicals and stress hormones. Together these might well cause illness, including loss of appetite, weakness, cardiac arrhythmias, and even vascular collapse that could result in death." Martin A. Samuels, MD, elaborates further on still another process of death, stating that with the release of adrenaline and an increased heart rate, sometimes catecholamines, stress hormones, will build up, leading to calcium channels opening and remaining open, resulting in an overflow of calcium into the system, killing off cells.

== Parasympathetic over-activation ==
Cannon believed that extreme emotional stress could be explained in terms of degree of sympathetic-adrenal excitation. However, an experiment performed by Curt Richter (1957) responded to Cannon's challenge with an animal model. Richter placed pre-stressed rats in closed turbulent water; the latency to drowning was then recorded. Most domestic lab rats lasted for hours while unexpectedly all of the wild rats died within 15 minutes. Richter monitored heart rate and determined whether the heart was in systole or diastole after death. He found out that heart rate slowed down prior to death and the heart was engaged with blood reflecting a state of diastole. This contradicted Cannons proposal that sympathetic adrenal over-activation is the result of death since a sympathetic over-arousal would increase both heart rate and blood pressure to severe degrees. Richter interpreted this that the rats died as a result of overstimulation of the parasympathetic nervous system, specifically the vagus nerve which regulates heartbeat. The lethal vagal effect was the psychological state of hopelessness.

Sudden prolonged immobility or faked death is an adaptive response exhibited by many mammalian species. Hofer(1970) demonstrated that several rodent species when threatened exhibited an immobility that was accompanied by a very low heart rate. For some of the rodents that heart rate reached below 50% of the baseline. Hofer distinguished between prolonged immobility and faked death phenomenon. Unlike the behavior of "hopelessness" described by Richter, the death-faking occurred with a sudden motor collapse during active struggling. Hofer interpreted the fear-inducing slowing of heart rate as a vagal phenomenon.

These data suggest that vagus contributes to severe emotional states and may be related to emotional states of immobilization, such as extreme terror. Unfortunately, this immobilization technique is potentially life-threatening for mammals (but not for reptiles). Mammals would undergo states of bradycardia or hypoxia as an over-activation of parasympathetic vagus system. The organs of the oxygen-hungry mammal are deprived of oxygen due to lack of blood flow, and the animal dies.

== Critical evaluation ==
Despite Cannon's general ignorance on the particulars of physiological breakdown, scientists in the intervening years since the publication of Cannon's work have generally agreed with his fundamental hypotheses concerning voodoo death. Criticisms that generally come against Cannon's work are directed at the hearsay nature of Cannon's case studies, but recent studies have discovered numerous examples of voodoo death in various societies. To those who allege difficulty in the experimental process of validating Cannon's theory, Barbara W. Lex, in her 1974 article titled, "Voodoo Death: New Thoughts on an Old Explanation", states that "Voodoo death" can easily be observed without complicated experiments. She wrote: "Pupillary constriction, easily observable and indicative of parasympathetic activation ... the amount of saliva, of perspiration, degree of muscle tonicity and skin pallor in an individual are also discernible without complicated instruments."

There are those who contest the theories involving psychologically induced body failure. David Lester, PhD, in 1972, contends that Cannon's evidence, particularly the evidence concerning animals, is anecdotal and irrelevant, and instead sets forth the concept of "death by suggestion", and supports "giving up-given up" complex set forth by George L. Engel, thus attributing the cause of death entirely to the psychological state of the individual in question rather than a psychological–physiological connection adduced by Cannon. Going even further, Harry D. Eastwell, MD, in his 1982 article, "Voodoo Death and the Mechanism for Dispatch of the Dying in East Arnhem, Australia", rejects entirely the concept of "Voodoo death", stating that the deaths in cases reported by Cannon et al. were more likely due to dehydration rather than to any psychological response.

== Influence of this theory on modern science ==
=== Fight or flight ===
Deeply related to these cases of sudden death is what Cannon termed the "fight-or-flight response", what has been classified as a "neurophysiological-behavioral" response pattern. "Fight or flight" is a phrase used to describe the instinctual and physiological responses to strong emotion within animals as well as humans. Cannon associates the two emotions of rage and fear because of the similar effects the emotions will have upon the mind and body—rage will encourage the response to "fight", while fear will encourage "flight". The mind, when faced with one or both of these emotions in response to a perceived threat, will emit adrenaline, and heart rate will increase; however, sometimes the system is overwhelmed by the responses, and collapse ensues as brought about by the workings of stress hormones. In the case of voodoo death, the "flight" response overpowers the system, but there is little to no possibility for action in the mind of the individual suffering from the perceived threat—considering the state of aboriginal tribes, the victims believe themselves to be suffering from a curse in which they are condemned to die, and so they believe themselves to be unable to act to save themselves.

=== New fields ===
Cannon's theory concerning voodoo death opened research into various fields of psychological studies; since the publication of Cannon's work, scientists have discovered many disorders and the like related to psychosomatic responses to situations. Because of Cannon's postulation that the mind could bring about death, scientists have become open to the idea of the mind working on the body in a greater number of ways, leading to the development of psychosomatic medicine. The advent of theories concerning voodoo death within the scientific field has also led to the development of a branch of psychology termed psychophysiology.

== Notable cases ==
Though cases within aboriginal societies are the most commonly cited when researchers such as Cannon set forth examples, similar cases of psychosomatic death have also been reported in other cultures. In his 1964 article, James L. Mathis, MD, describes a case of a previously healthy man who died from asthmatic attacks when his mother "cursed" him for going against her wishes. Mathis proposes that "fatal psychosomatic conditions" were the cause of this man's death, and thus a form of voodoo death. In 1992, another scientist—Clifton K. Meador, MD—discussed the case of a man diagnosed with cancer who, along with his physicians and family, believed he was dying of cancer. In the autopsy after his death, however, the doctors discovered that his cancer was not at all the cause of his death. Meador deduces that the man's belief in his imminent death was the cause of his death itself.

== See also ==
- Apparent death
- Broken heart syndrome
- Death by laughter
- List of unusual deaths
- Nocebo
- Stress (biological)
- Symptoms of victimization
- Syncope (medicine)
- The Man and the Snake
- Widowhood effect

== General sources ==
- Cannon, Walter. "Voodoo Death". American Anthropologist, 44. 1942. 169–181.
- Eastwell, Harry D. "Voodoo Death and the Mechanism for Dispatch of the Dying in East Arnhem, Australia". American Anthropologist, 84.1. 1982. 5–18.
- Gomez, E.A. "Voodoo and sudden death: the effects of expectations on health". Transcultural Psychiatric Research Review, 19. 1982. 75–91.
- Lane, R.D., Waldstein, S.R., Chesney, M.A, et al. "The Rebirth of Neuroscience in Psychosomatic Medicine, Part I: Historical Context, Methods, and Relevant Basic Science". Psychosom Medicine, 71.2. 1 Feb 2009. 117–134.
- Lester, David. "Voodoo Death: Some New Thoughts on an Old Phenomenon". American Anthropologist, 74.3. 1972. 386–390.
- Lester, David. "Voodoo Death". Omega, 59.1. 2009. 1–18.
- Lex, Barbara W. "Voodoo Death: New Thoughts on an Old Explanation". American Anthropologist, 76.4. 1974. 818–823.
- Kirn, Timothy F. "Voodoo Death Is Brain's Lethal Response to Fear ". Clinical Psychiatry Jan 2004. Web. 15 Nov 2009..
- Mathis, James L. "Sophisticated Version of Voodoo Death". American Psychosomatic Society, 26. 1964. 104–107.
- Sternberg, Esther. "Walter B. Cannon and 'Voodoo' Death: A Perspective from 60 Years On". Am J Public Health, 92.10. 2002. 1564–1566.
