= Kittie Brighton =

American politician (1879–1943)

Member of the Colorado House of Representatives
- In office 1927–1932
- Succeeded by: Emilio Maio

Personal details
- Born: Kittie Collins; 1879 Missouri, U.S.
- Died: 1943 (aged 63–64) U.S.
- Party: Democratic
- Spouse: Alexander Brighton
- Children: 4
- Occupation: Politician, state legislator

Kittie Brighton (née Kittie Collins; 1879 – 1943), sometimes written as Kitty Brighton, was an American state legislator in Colorado, and a member of the Democratic Party. She was appointed in 1923 by Governor Billy Adams to serve an unexpired term representing Las Animas County in the Colorado House of Representatives, where she remained until 1932. Brighton was succeeded in the role by Emilio Maio.

She, Helen Beatty Noland and Annah G. Pettee sponsored a bill in 1929 to allow physicians to provide information on birth control. During the 28th Colorado Assembly in 1931, Brighton was the only woman to hold a seat. She had lived in Trinidad, Colorado.

She was married to Alexander "Alex" Brighton, a police officer who was killed in 1909 while working. Together they had four children.
