= Gail Monroe Dack =

American physician and professor of bacteriology

Gail Monroe Dack (March 4, 1901, Belvidere, Illinois – June 21, 1976, Kane County, Illinois) was an American physician and professor of bacteriology, known as a leading expert on food-borne illnesses.

== Biography ==
Gail M. Dack graduated in 1918 from Elgin High School and in 1922 with a B.S. from the University of Illinois Urbana-Champaign. He graduated in 1927 with a Ph.D. from the University of Chicago and in 1933 with an M.D. from the University of Chicago Medical School (now named the Pritzker School of Medicine). In the University of Chicago's department of bacteriology, he was from 1925 to 1929 an instructor, from 1929 to 1937 an assistant professor, from 1937 to 1946 an associate professor, from 1946 to 1966 a full professor, and then a professor emeritus in retirement. From 1946 to 1966 he was also the director of the University of Chicago's Food Research Institute. From 1952 to 1953 he chaired the National Research Council Committee on Foods.

In a classic 1930 paper, Dack and 3 colleagues published an account of food poisoning that occurred in Chicago in December 1929. Eleven people became sick with vomiting and severe diarrhea after eating, on slightly different occasions, three-layered sponge cake filled with cream. Separate, different, cake components were fed to monkeys and to human volunteers without ill effects. A thorough bacteriological examination of the cake substance yielded 19 different types of bacterial colonies — but the only type found to be of importance was a yellow hemolytic Staphylococcus. Using that Staphylococcus colony, the Chicago researchers prepared a sterile filtrate containing the bacterial enterotoxins. Injection of the filtrate into a rabbit caused death with severe diarrhea. Three human volunteers, namely the physicians William E. Cary, Edwin O. Jordan, and Dack, drank different volumes of the filtrate. Dack, who drank the largest volume, became violently ill, and the other two physicians had minor symptoms. Heat lability experiments established a heating protocol that safely destroyed the bacteria. Lawrence K. Altman, M.D., gave a brief, vivid account of this self-experimentation.

In addition to his research on staphylococcal food poisoning, Dack studied botulism, ulcerative colitis, and salmonella infection.

In 1917 Edwin O. Jordan, who later became Dack's mentor, published a 107-page monograph entitled Food Poisoning. After Jordan's death in 1936, Dack took responsibility for updates of the book and published his first version of Food Poisoning in 1943 with subsequent editions in 1949 and 1956.

In 1951 Dack was elected a fellow of the American Association for the Advancement of Science. He was the president of the American Society for Microbiology in 1953. He received in 1925 the Howard Taylor Ricketts Prize and in 1956 the Babcock-Hart Award. In 1957 he won the Pasteur Award of the Illinois Society for Microbiology.

Dack married Martha Pierson Bowsfield in 1926. They had two children.

== Selected publications ==
- Dack, G. M. (1936). "Bacterium Necrophorum in Chronic Ulcerative Colitis". Journal of the American Medical Association. 106: 7. doi:10.1001/jama.1936.02770010009002. The term Bacterium necrophorum as used by Dack might be a synonym for Fusobacterium necrophorum, which can cause Lemierre's syndrome.
- Dack, G. M.; Dragstedt, Lester R. (1938). "Effect of introducing oxygen into the isolated colon of a patient with chronic ulcerative colitis". American Journal of Digestive Diseases. 5 (2): 84–86. doi:10.1007/BF03010599.
- Dack, G. M. (1940). "Non-sporeforming anaerobic bacteria of medical importance". Bacteriological Reviews. 4 (4): 227–259. doi:10.1128/br.4.4.227-259.1940. PMC 440844. PMID 16350065.
- Dragstedt, L. R.; Dack, G. M.; Kirsner, J. B. (1941). "Chronic Ulcerative Colitis: A Summary of Evidence Implicating Bacterium Necrophorum as an Etiologic Agent". Annals of Surgery. 114 (4): 653–662. doi:10.1097/00000658-194110000-00011. PMC 1385817. PMID 17857900.
- Surgalla, Michael J.; Dack, G. M. (1955). "Enterotoxin Produced by Micrococci from Cases of Enteritis After Antibiotic Therapy". Journal of the American Medical Association. 158 (8): 649–650. doi:10.1001/jama.1955.02960080025006a. PMID 14381232.
- Bergdoll, M. S.; Sugiyama, H.; Dack, G.M. (1959). "Staphylococcal enterotoxin. I. Purification". Archives of Biochemistry and Biophysics. 85: 62–69. doi:10.1016/0003-9861(59)90447-3. PMID 13799261.
- Sugiyama, H.; Bergdoll, M. S.; Dack, G. M. (1960). "In vitro studies on staphylococcal enterotoxin production". Journal of Bacteriology. 80 (2): 265–270. doi:10.1128/jb.80.2.265-270.1960. PMC 278851. PMID 13835574.
- Dack, G. M.; Lippitz, G. (1962). "Fate of Staphylococci and Enteric Microorganisms Introduced into Slurry of Frozen Pot Pies". Applied Microbiology. 10 (5): 472–479. doi:10.1128/am.10.5.472-479.1962. PMC 1057895. PMID 14024577.
- Dack, G. M. (1963). "Staphylococcus Enterotoxin: A Review". Japanese Journal of Medical Science and Biology. 16 (1): 1–12. doi:10.7883/yoken1952.16.1. PMID 14044249. S2CID 23033534.
