= Helen Beatty Noland =

American politician (c. 1907–1962)

Helen Beatty Noland (née Helen Hagerman Beatty; c. 1907 – April 15, 1962) was an American civil servant and politician. She was a state legislator in Colorado who represented La Plata County, from 1927 to 1930; and also worked for many years at the Colorado State Board of Public Health.

Noland began her career as a Republican, but many years later she changed parties to Democrat out of admiration of President Franklin D. Roosevelt. She was married to James M. Noland, a district judge. They lived in Durango, Colorado.

She, Kittie Brighton, and Annah G. Pettee sponsored a bill in 1929 to allow physicians to provide information on birth control. Noland also supported a bill in 1929 that supported equality for women.
