= Edwin O. Jordan =

American bacteriologist (1866–1936)

Edwin Jordan
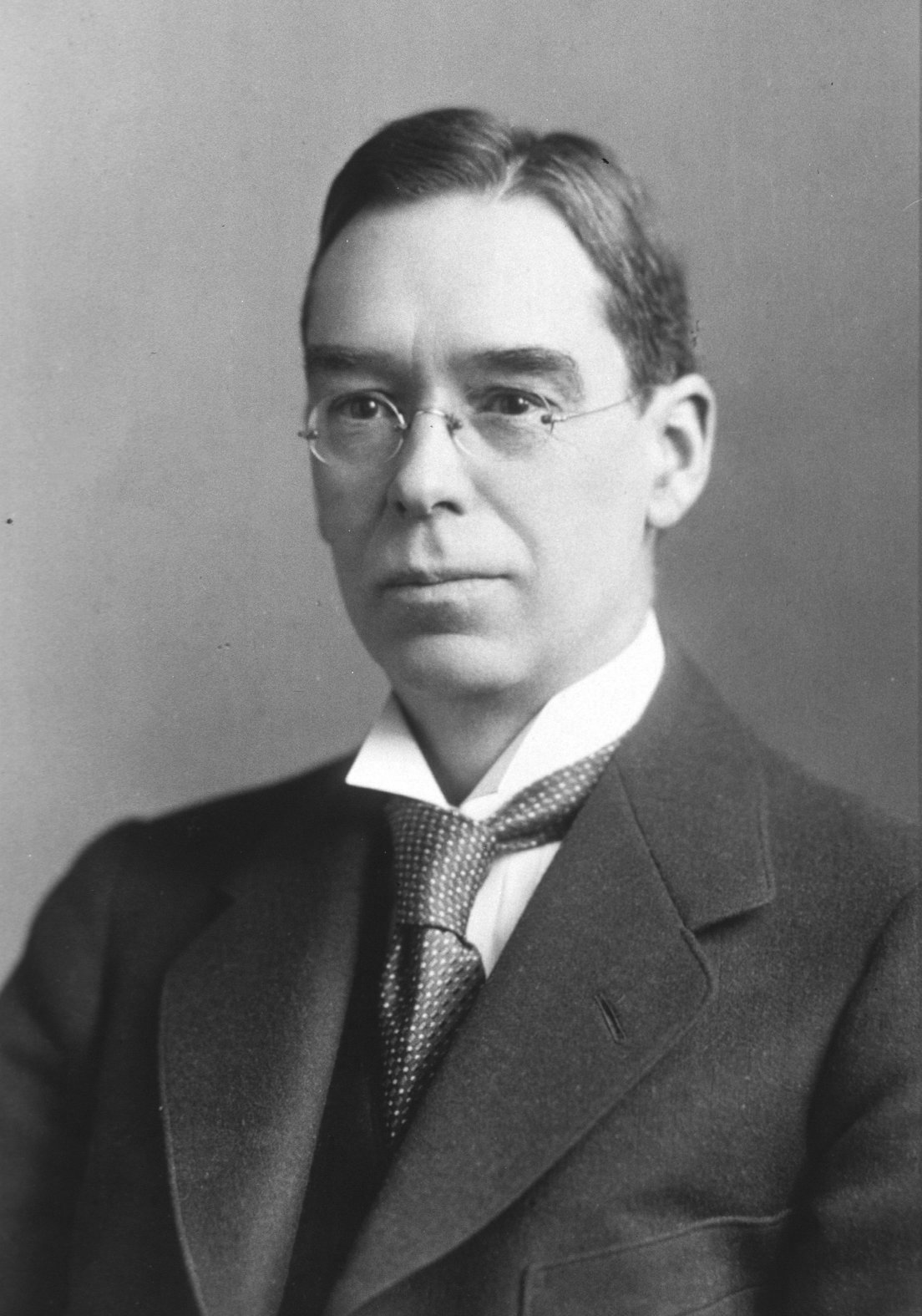
- Born: July 28, 1866; Thomaston, Maine, US
- Died: September 2, 1936 (aged 70); Chicago, US
- Parents: Joshua Lane Jordan; Eliza Deborah Bugbee
- Scientific career
- Fields: Bacteriology
- Doctoral students: Robert Earle Buchanan

Edwin Oakes Jordan (also spelled as Jordon; July 28, 1866 – September 2, 1936) was a prominent American bacteriologist and public health scientist.

Jordan's scientific work began in 1888 right after his graduation from the Massachusetts Institute of Technology, where he had been a distinguished pupil of Professor William Thompson Sedgwick. He built the Department of Bacteriology at the University of Chicago. He was a meticulous researcher who produced "data of indisputable accuracy". "His analytic mind and unwillingness to draw conclusions except from sufficient data" are prominent in his reports on epidemics. He co-founded the Journal of Infectious Diseases, and was editor of the Journal of Preventive Medicine. He won the Sedgwick Memorial Medal in 1934. His textbook of bacteriology has gone through many editions.

Perhaps his most lasting contribution of continuing interest today is the 1927 book Epidemic Influenza, which reviewed the data on the Great Pandemic of 1918 to ascertain its causes. Jordan concluded that the extreme overcrowding of troops in the American military not only helped to spread the infection but to also to make the flu germ itself more virulent, thus causing the unusually high death toll specific to that influenza epidemic.

The bacteriologist Gail M. Dack was Jordan's protégé.

Jordan's siblings included the librarian Alice Mabel Jordan. Jordan married Elsie Fay Pratt Jordan in 1893, and they had two sons, Henry Donaldson and Edwin Pratt, and a daughter Lucia Elizabeth Dunham. His grandchildren included historian Winthrop D. Jordan and ambassador David C. Jordan.
