= Shaw Loo =

Burmese physician (1839–1929)

- ရှောလူး
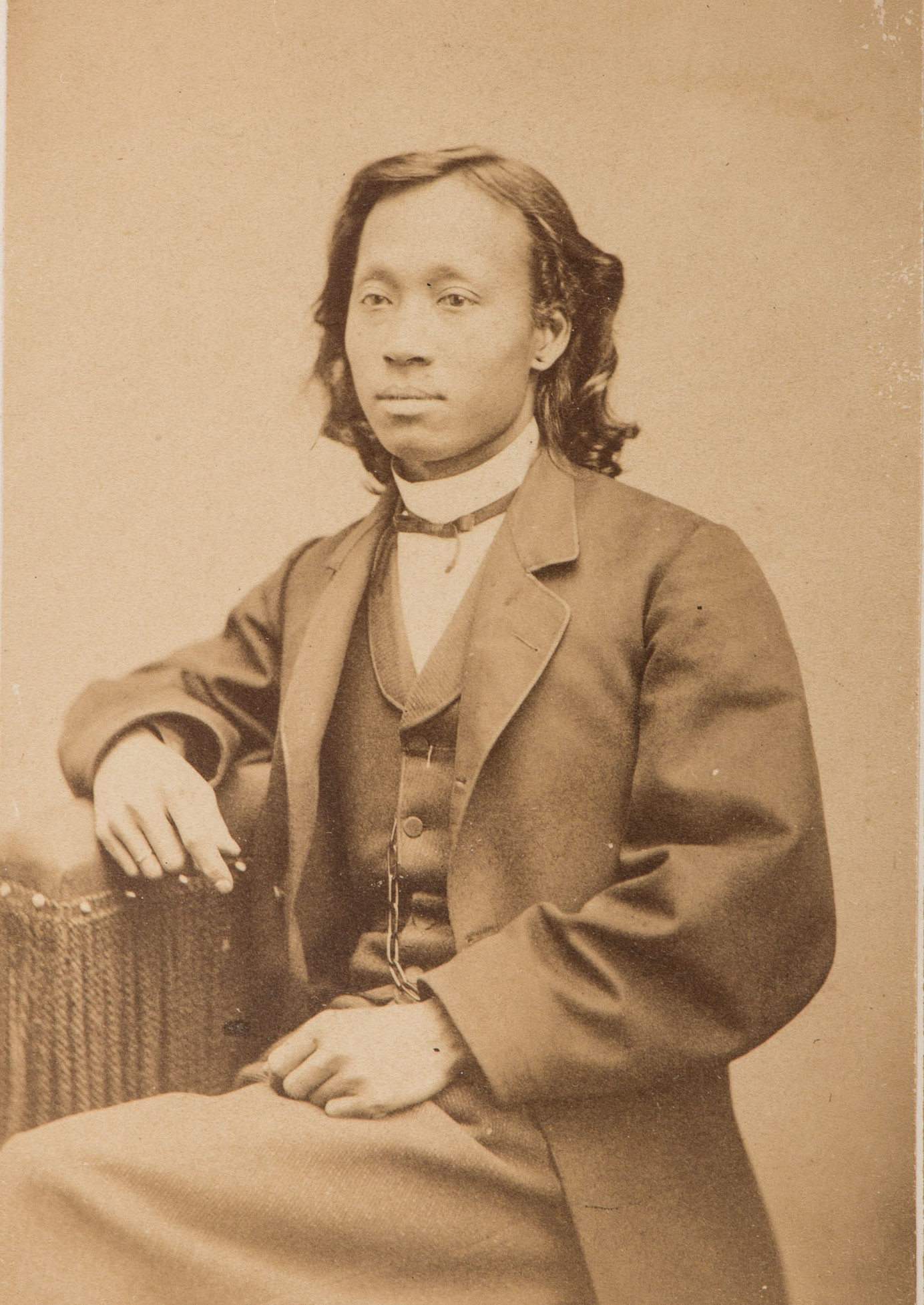
- Dr Shaw Loo
- Born: 1 January 1839; Tuesday, 2nd waning of Pyatho 1200 ME; Moulmein, British Burma
- Died: 10 October 1929 (aged 90); Thursday, 8th waxing of Thadingyut 1291 ME; Moulmein, British Burma
- Education: University at Lewisburg; Cleveland Medical College
- Occupation: Physician
- Known for: First Burmese physician
- Spouses: Lucy Pereira (died): Shwe Pwint
- Children: 10

Shaw Loo (Burmese: ရှောလူး; 1 January 1839 – 10 October 1929) was the first Western-trained Burmese physician. He was the first Burmese student to study in the United States. He was the first Burmese to receive a Western medical degree, and Bucknell University awarded him an M.A. degree, making him the first Burmese to receive a post-graduate master's degree. Shaw Loo is regarded as the "father of modern medicine" in Myanmar.

== Early life ==
Shaw Loo was born on 1 January 1839 to an ethnic Mon family, in Moulmein then under British rule. He was the eldest son of Shwe Thet and Pwa Hla. His mother, Pwa Hla, was a great-granddaughter of Barai-Vati, Duke of Myawaddy, and a younger brother of King Binnya Dala. His father Shwe Thet taught Burmese to British officers. After his parents divorced in 1854, his relatives had to care for Shwe Loo for the next few years.

== Career ==
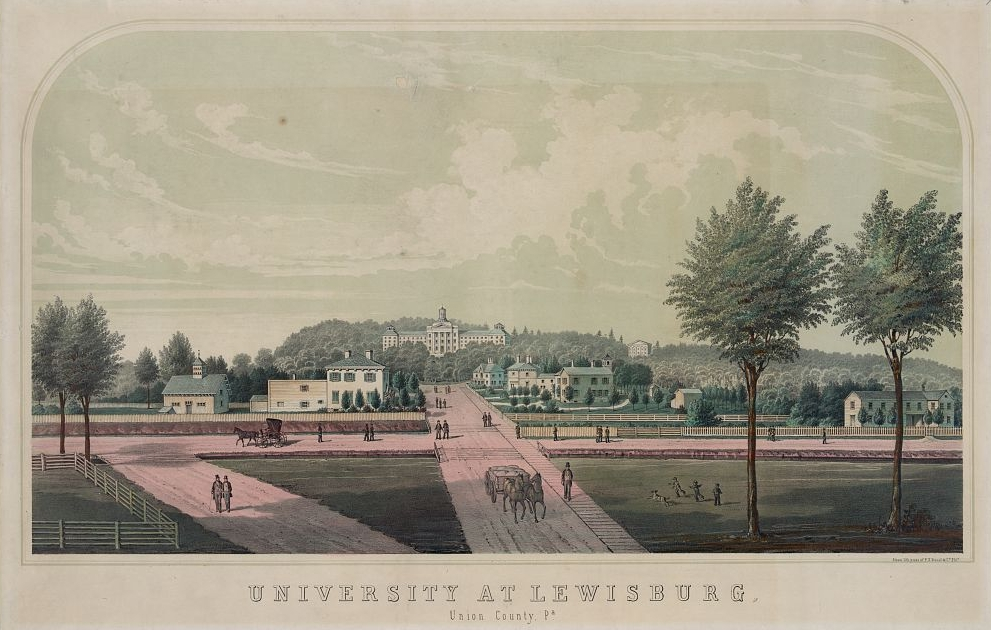
Bucknell University in the 1870s

In 1857, when he was 17, Shaw Loo left for Calcutta for university. During the Indian Mutiny in 1858, he traveled to the United States on a ship, working as a cabin boy. As he had no money, he took on odd jobs to make a living until he was able to go to the University at Lewisburg (now Bucknell University) in Pennsylvania. There he studied Greek, Latin, philosophy, history, and science. He became the university's first international student. He enrolled at Cleveland Medical College and received his medical degree in 1867, becoming the first western-trained Burmese physician. In the same year, the University of Lewisburg also awarded him an M.A. degree.

In 1867, Shaw Loo met President Andrew Johnson, and persuaded him to write a recommendation letter to King Mindon. Upon his return to Burma, Shaw Loo was received by King Mindon in Mandalay. The king allowed him to stay in the north royal garden, and offered him a position at the royal court. However, Shaw Loo declined the offer. He only stayed at the palace for about 20 days before returning to Moulmein, where he spent most of his professional life serving patients and educating students. In February 1878, he compiled a medical book called Painkiller. It was published by U Ni at the Moulmein Aswe Printing House. Shaw Loo was baptized by Adoniram Judson. He died on 10 October 1929 in Moulmein at the age of 90.

== Family ==
Shaw Loo was married twice. In 1869, while working as a teacher at Rangoon Government High School. He married Lucy Pereira, daughter of a British captain. They had seven children. His wife died while giving birth to the youngest child. After two years, he married Shwe Pwint, and the couple had three children.

== Legacy ==
Ninety years after Shaw Loo's arrival at Lewisburg, the University of Lewisburg created Burma-Bucknell Weekends to honor its unique and long-lasting ties with Burma. From 1949 to 1966, 16 Burma-Bucknell Weekends were held; Burmese students from nearby colleges and personnel from the Burmese Embassy were invited as a symbol of friendship between the country and Bucknell. The Burma-Bucknell Bowl Award, a symbol of friendship between Burma and Bucknell, is awarded annually to students and academics who have made significant contributions to intercultural and international understanding.
