= Lester O. Krampitz =

American microbiologist

Lester Orville Krampitz (July 9, 1909, Maple Lake, Minnesota – May 18, 1993, Cleveland, Ohio) was an American microbiologist.

== Biography ==
After graduating from high school in Buffalo Lake, Minnesota, Krampitz matriculated in 1927 at Macalester College, where he graduated in 1931 with a bachelor's degree with a joint major in biology and chemistry. From 1931 to 1938 he taught high school and occasionally worked at miscellaneous jobs. In 1938 he became a graduate student at Iowa State College (now named Iowa State University). There he did research on microbial metabolism and graduated in 1942 with a Ph.D. in microbiology. His Ph.D. thesis The fixation of carbon dioxide in oxalacetic acid and its relationship to bacterial inspiration was supervised by C. H. Werkman. For the academic year 1942–1943 as a postdoc in D. W. Woolley's laboratory at the Rockefeller Institute, Krampitz did research on vitamin antagonists that occur in nature. From 1943 to 1946 he was an assistant professor of bacteriology at Iowa State.

In 1946 Krampitz became a member of the biochemistry department of Case Western Reserve University School of Medicine. There he was from 1946 to 1948 an associate professor in the biochemistry department and from 1948 to 1978 a full professor and director of the microbiology department (which was formed in 1948). He did some research on penicillin's mode of action. As director of the microbiology department, he hired a number of noteworthy faculty members, including L. Leon Campbell, Howard Gest, and Charles Yanofsky. Krampitz, in a 1956 letter to Joshua Lederberg, proposed Yanofsky for the Eli Lilly and Company-Elanco Research Award, which Yanofsky received in 1959.

For the academic year 1955–1956, the Fulbright Program enabled Krampitz for seven months to conduct research on tartrates in Feodor Lynen's laboratory, where he met Otto Warburg.

Krampitz was one of the most important participants in the reorganization of Case Western Reserve's medical school curriculum. Traditionally, course material was taught by specific discipline (such as anatomy, immunology, toxicology, and so on) — in the new approach the courses were taught in terms of organ systems in integrated explanations. Clinical studies were introduced in the first year of medical school. Medical students were required to pursue research projects. This innovative approach significantly influenced medical schools in the United States.

Krampitz's research involved the use of isotopes in the study of the carbon metabolism of bacteria, until his research switched to biohydrogen in the context of the 1973 oil crisis. In 1978 he resigned his positions and retired. He kept a small laboratory and visited it every day until he fell ill in the early 1990s.

Krampitz was awarded in 1958 an honorary doctorate from Macalester College. He was elected in 1968 a foreign member of the Bayerische Akademie der Wissenschaften and in 1978 a member of the United States National Academy of Sciences.

He married Norma Peterson in 1931. They had a daughter Joyce.

== Selected publications ==
- Krampitz, Lester Orville; Werkman, Chester Hamlin (1941). "The enzymic decarboxylation of oxaloacetate". Biochemical Journal. 35 (5–6): 595–602. doi:10.1042/bj0350595. PMC 1265535. PMID 16747426.
- Woolley, D. W.; Krampitz, L. O. (1943). "Production of a Scurvy-Like Condition by Feeding of a Compound Structurally Related to Ascorbic Acid". The Journal of Experimental Medicine. 78 (5): 333–339. doi:10.1084/jem.78.5.333. PMC 2135414. PMID 19871333.
- Krampitz, L. O.; Woolley, D. W. (1944). "The manner of inactivation of thiamine by fish tissue". Journal of Biological Chemistry. 152: 9–17. doi:10.1016/S0021-9258(18)72084-X.
- Wilson, J.; Krampitz, L. O.; Werkman, C. H. (1948). "Reversibility of a phosphoroclastic reaction". The Biochemical Journal. 42 (4): 598–600. doi:10.1042/bj0420598. PMC 1258788. PMID 16748337.
- Levine, S.; Krampitz, L. O. (1952). "The Oxidation of Acetone by a Soil Diphtheroid". Journal of Bacteriology. 64 (5): 645–650. doi:10.1128/jb.64.5.645-650.1952. PMC 169405. PMID 12999694.
- Swim, H. Earle; Krampitz, Lester O. (1954). "Acetic Acid Oxidation by Escherichia Coli: Evidence for the Occurrence of a Tricarboxylic Acid Cycle". Journal of Bacteriology. 67 (4): 419–425. doi:10.1128/jb.67.4.419-425.1954. PMC 357246. PMID 13152052.
- Saz, Howard J.; Krampitz, Lester O. (1954). "The oxidation of acetate by Micrococcus lysodeikticus". Journal of Bacteriology. 67 (4): 409–418. doi:10.1128/jb.67.4.409-418.1954. PMC 357245. PMID 13152051.
- Swim, H. Earle; Krampitz, Lester O. (1954). "Acetic Acid Oxidation by Escherichia coli: Quantitative Significance of the Tricarboxylic Acid Cycle". Journal of Bacteriology. 67 (4): 426–434. doi:10.1128/jb.67.4.426-434.1954. PMC 357247. PMID 13152053.
- Krampitz, L.O. (1957). [50] Preparation and determination of acetoin, diacetyl, and acetolactate. Methods in Enzymology. Vol. 3. pp. 277–283. doi:10.1016/S0076-6879(57)03390-X. ISBN 9780121818036.
- Krampitz, Lester O.; Greull, Gerhard; Miller, Charles S.; Bicking, John B.; Skeggs, Helen R.; Sprague, James M. (1958). "An Active Acetaldehyde-Thiamine Intermediate". Journal of the American Chemical Society. 80 (21): 5893–5894. doi:10.1021/ja01554a078.
- Krampitz, L. O. (1969). "Catalytic Functions of Thiamin Diphosphate". Annual Review of Biochemistry. 38: 213–240. doi:10.1146/annurev.bi.38.070169.001241. PMID 4896238.
