= Emelia Benjamin =

American cardiologist and researcher

Emelia J. Benjamin MD, ScM, FACC, FAHA
- Education: Harvard University (B.S.; M.P.H.); Case Western Reserve University (M.D., 1983)
- Known for: Atrial fibrillation, heart failure
- Awards: Functional Genomics and Translational Biology Council Mentoring Award (2013); Paul Dudley White Award; Golden Heart Award
- Scientific career
- Fields: Medicine; Cardiology; Epidemiology
- Institutions: Boston University, Boston Medical Center

Emelia J. Benjamin is an American cardiologist and researcher. She is a professor of medicine at the Boston University School of Medicine, Professor of Epidemiology at the Boston University School of Public Health, and also a practicing cardiologist at Boston Medical Center.

Benjamin is author of over 800 peer-reviewed publications. She is one of the most cited investigators in clinical cardiology with over 330,000 citations and an h-index of 200.

The American Heart Association named her the 2022 Distinguished Scientist.
