= Cordelia A. Greene Library =

Library in New York

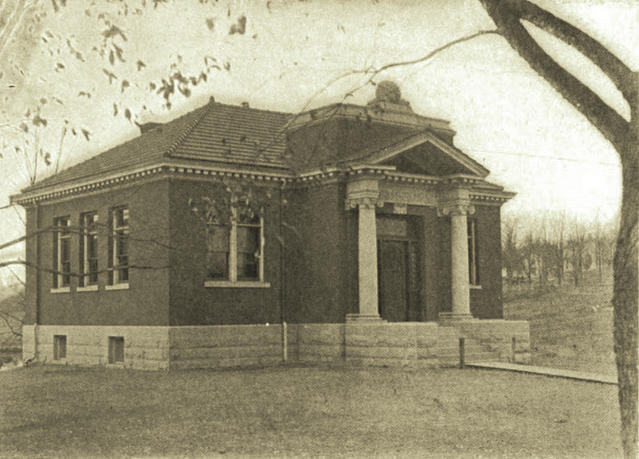
- Location: Castile, New York, U.S.
- Type: association library
- Established: March 9, 1897
- Dissolved: 42°37′54″N 78°03′06″W
- Architect: Otto Block

Access and use
- Population served: 2,906

Other information
- Parent organization: Pioneer Library System
- Website: owwl.org/library/cordelia-a-greene-library-castile/

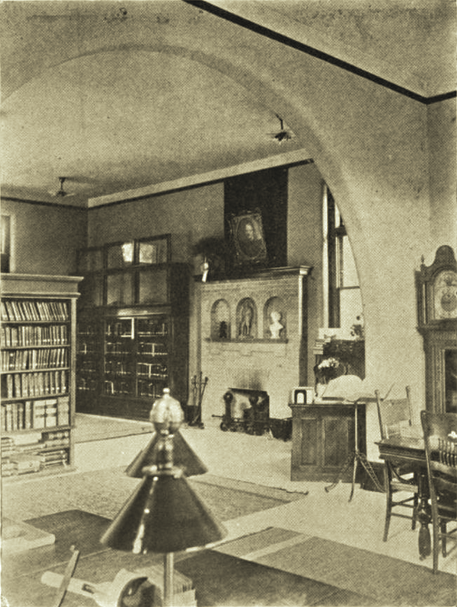
interior

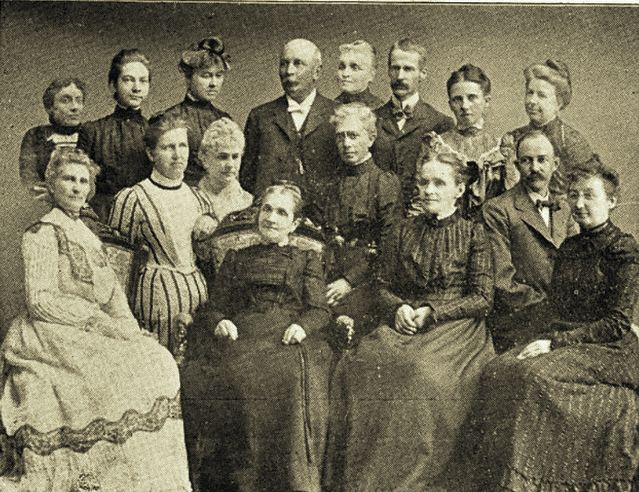
Library directors

Cordelia A. Greene Library is an American association library located in Castile, New York. Founded in 1897, it was named in honor of Cordelia A. Greene, M.D. who donated the land upon which it was built.

== History ==
Mrs. Judge Clark, of Chicago, a former patient and long-time friend, once told Greene that her patients desired to make her the recipient of a testimonial that would be a lasting evidence of their appreciation. Greene was deeply moved and replied that nothing would please her more than to see her townspeople enjoying the privilege of a free library. After Mrs. Clark's decease, her daughter, Miss Kate Clark, while at the Castile Sanitarium, in 1896, formed the Cordelia A. Greene Library Building Association. The charter and honorary members were chosen from the patients and women of Castile. The news was sent to Greene, who was then in the Hawaiian Islands. On Greene's return from Hawaii, she made the town a gift of US$500 for books.

The Cordelia A. Greene Library formally opened on March 9, 1897, (Note: According to Dewey et al, the library opened on February 22, 1897.) with Frances Willard presiding at the ceremony. It was housed temporarily in one half of the first floor of the town hall, for the permanent use of which Greene paid US$1,000. The nucleus of this library consisted of the 500 volumes of the Scribner "model library" and about 200 other volumes, the use of which was given to the public through the good will of Greene.

In July 1898, it was incorporated under the laws of the state and was legally known as the "Cordelia A. Greene Library of Castile, New York".

The library association collected voluntary donations towards a building. As the site opposite the Castile Sanitarium, which Greene founded, was considered the most desirable and appropriate for a new building, Greene presented the library association with a deed of the land for this purpose.

== Architecture and fittings ==
On August 11, 1902, the cornerstone of the Cordelia A. Greene Library was laid. A sealed copper box, containing a history of the library association, as well as valuable papers and records, were placed in the stone by Greene. The building was designed by Otto Block, of Rochester, New York. Fred Gleason, of that city was the contractor. It was built at cost of US$8,250. The one-story building was constructed of red brick, and laid in colored mortar, with blue stone trimmings. The frontage was 44 feet (13 m), depth 30 feet (9.1 m), vestibule in front 6 by 16 feet (1.8 m × 4.9 m), and a porch with stone columns.

The interior was divided into two rooms, a ready room and stock room, a large arch making the division. These room were 14 feet (4.3 m) high. The librarian's desk was placed so that it overlooked the entire interior. The vestibule provides and entrance and cloak room. All windows were placed 3 feet (0.91 m) from the floor to allow more space for books. The floors were all of tile, the vestibule bordered with marble. A fire place and a furnace provided heat for the building. Electric wiring was put in ready for use when the power could be secured. The stone was from the quarries of the American Blue Stone Company at Rock Glen, and the brick from the Attica yards.

The new building was formally dedicated on December 24, 1902. With construction completed, a transfer of the books was made. Greene spent hundreds of dollars beautifying the grounds with lawns, ponds, and a fountain, and provided a boat for children. The adjacent grove extending into a park was given to the children for a playground. It was Greene's endowment of US$15,000 which paid the running expenses and bought new books.
