= Elizabeth Putnam Gordon =

American temperance advocate, author, and editor

- Born: November 25, 1851; Boston, Massachusetts, U.S.
- Died: November 30, 1933; Castile Sanitarium, Castile, New York, U.S.
- Other names: Elizabeth P. Gordon
- Occupations: temperance advocate; author; editor
- Notable work: Women torch-bearers; the story of the Woman's Christian Temperance Union

Elizabeth Putnam Gordon (November 25, 1851 – November 30, 1933) was an American temperance advocate, author, and editor. She held positions of authority with the Massachusetts, National, and World's Woman's Christian Temperance Union (W.C.T.U.) organizations. Gordon was the author of Women torch-bearers; the story of the Woman's Christian Temperance Union (1924), a story-history of the W.C.T.U.'s fifty years of activity. It was the first time the entire history of the organization, records, documents and other data were gathered into one volume.

== Biography ==
Elizabeth (nickname, "Bessie") Putnam Gordon was born in Boston, Massachusetts, November 25, 1851. She was the third daughter of James M. Gordon, who was for eleven years treasurer of the American Board of Foreign Missions, for twenty years cashier of the Columbia National Bank, and an honorary members of the white ribbon army. Three of his daughters were prominent in the councils of that society: Anna Adams Gordon, Alice Gordon Gulick, and Bessie. She was reared in the most conservative manner in a Congregational church.

Gordon attended Mount Holyoke College in 1872 but did not graduate.

Bessie was for seven years corresponding secretary of the Massachusetts W.C.T.U., and also served as one of its speakers and organizers. She served as Evangelist for the National W.C.T.U., and superintendent of School Methods for the World's W.C.T.U. She was the author of Women torch-bearers; the story of the Woman's Christian Temperance Union (1924), a story-history of the W.C.T.U.'s fifty years of activity. It was the first time the entire history of the organization, records, documents and other data were gathered into one volume.

Gordon published a biography of her sister, Alice Gordon Gulick (1917), which included a poem dedicated to Gulick by Katharine Lee Bates. Gordon was also the author of The Story of the Life and Work of Cordelia A. Greene, M.D. (1925).

Elizabeth Putnam Gordon died at Castile Sanitarium, Castile, New York, November 30, 1933.

== Selected works ==
=== Books ===
- Alice Gordon Gulick (1917)
- Women torch-bearers; the story of the Woman's Christian Temperance Union (1924) (Text)
- The Story of the Life and Work of Cordelia A. Greene, M.D. (1925)

=== Articles ===
- "Municipal Election in Boston" (1889)
- "Frances Willards' Widening Way" (1917) (Text)
