= Stanton Gerson =

American physician and cancer researcher

Stanton L. Gerson is an American physician and cancer researcher who serves as the Dean of the School of Medicine and Senior Vice President for Medical Affairs at Case Western Reserve University (CWRU). He holds the titles of Director of the National Center for Regenerative Medicine, the Asa and Patricia Shiverick—Jane Shiverick (Tripp) Professor of Hematological Oncology, and Distinguished University Professor at Case Western Reserve.

== Early life and education ==
Stanton L. Gerson was raised in Lincoln, Massachusetts, and earned his bachelor's degree from Harvard College, where he conducted research under Boris Magasanik at MIT. He received his MD from Harvard Medical School and completed a residency and hematology-oncology fellowship at the Hospital of the University of Pennsylvania.

== Career ==
Stanton L. Gerson researches DNA repair mechanisms, stem cell biology, and the development of early-phase cancer clinical trials. His work on blood monitoring protocols was instrumental in FDA approval of clozapine. His research has been licensed by companies such as Lentigen, Tracon, Novartis, Osiris.

He co-founded Rodeo, a private biopharmaceutical company bought by Amgen on March 30, 2021.

He is co-editor of the international textbook Gene Therapy of Cancer: Translational Approaches from Preclinical Studies to Clinical Implementation and the medical textbook Clinical Hematology.
