= Cordelia A. Greene =

American physician, benefactor, and suffragist

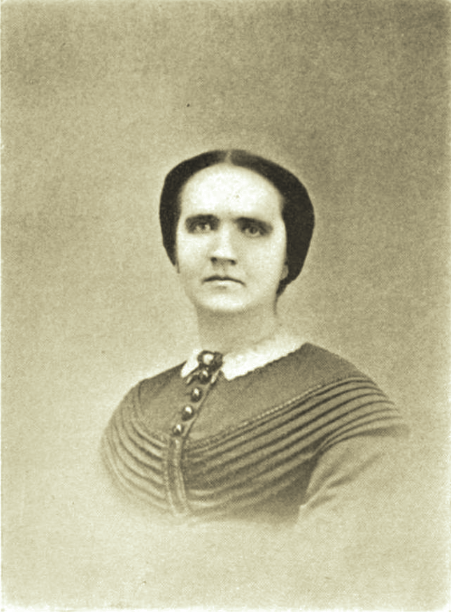
- Born: July 5, 1831; Lyons, New York, U.S.
- Died: January 28, 1905 (aged 73); New York City, U.S.
- Education: Woman's Medical College of Pennsylvania; Western Reserve University
- Occupation: physician
- Years active: 47
- Relatives: Lawrence and Cassandra Southwick, Annah G. Pettee (niece)
- Medical career
- Institutions: Castile Sanitarium
- Notable works: The Art of Keeping Well

Cordelia A. Greene (July 5, 1831 – January 28, 1905) was a 19th-century American physician, benefactor, and suffragist from Upstate New York. She was the founder and director of the Castile Sanitarium in Castile, New York. Greene published, Build Well, in 1885; her revision of it, The Art of Keeping Well, was published posthumously in 1906. A biography, The Story of the Life and Work of Cordelia A. Greene, M.D., was published in 1925. The Cordelia A. Greene Library in Castile was named in her honor.

== Early life and education ==
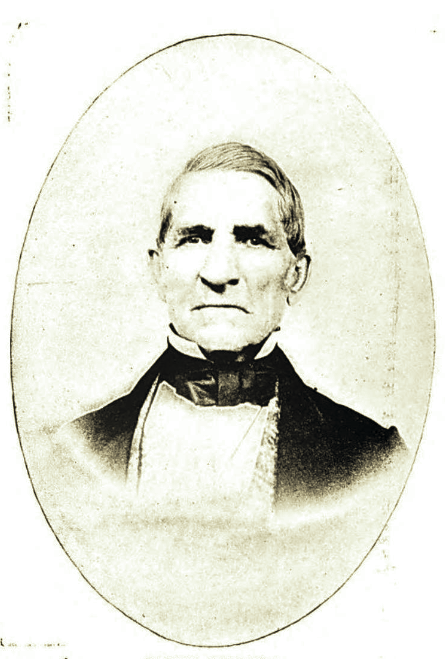
Jabez Greene

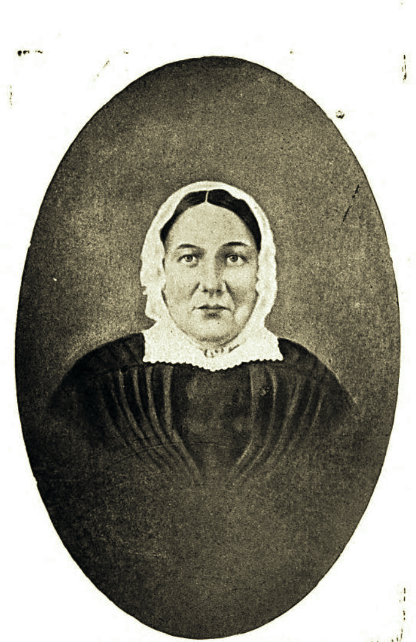
Phila Greene

Cordelia Agnes Greene was born in Lyons, New York, July 5, 1831. Her parents were Doctor Jabez Greene and his wife Phila. Her paternal and maternal ancestors were of New England birth and for generations had been Quakers. Her mother, a native of Uxbridge, Massachusetts, was a direct descendant of the Southwick family, of which Lawrence and Cassandra Southwick were early members. Her father was son of David Greene, of Rhode Island. Cordelia had three younger brothers, David, George and Frank.

Until she was twelve years old, Cordelia lived on a farm near Lyons, New York.

The Greene family attended the Methodist "meeting-house" nearest their farm, the marriage of Mr. and Mrs. Greene "out of meeting" having caused them to lose their standing with the Quaker community. When Greene was about 12 years old, the family moved to the village and attended the Presbyterian Church, with which the parents united. Greene is recorded as saying that she believed she was one-third Quaker, one-third Methodist, and one-third Presbyterian.

Doctor Jabez Greene was a trustee of the Lyons public school, and largely through his advocacy, it became a graded school. Cordelia reportedly did well in all her classes, and was especially fond of history.

At the age of 16, Greene received a teacher's certificate from the county. The family moved to Pike, New York, and Greene taught a country school for one summer. She boarded around and was paid US$3 per week.

In 1849, the Greenes moved to Castile, New York. Doctor Jabez Greene, well-versed in Hydrotherapy, purchased an inn in Castile from General John D. Landon, and established a medical institute known as "The Water Cure."

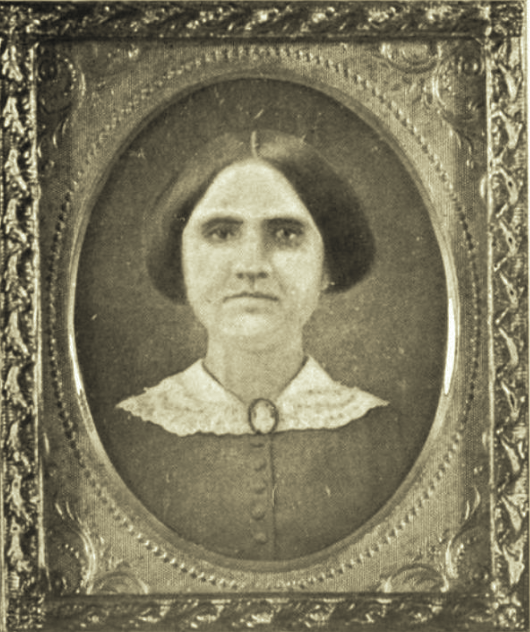
Greene as a medical student, before 1855

For some months, Greene had lung trouble, which so affected her voice, that it never fully regained its strength. Under her father's care, she improved steadily, and after regaining her health, entered the Woman's Medical College of Pennsylvania, in Philadelphia. Business reverses had come to her father, and by her own efforts in caring for the sick, Cordelia earned the money to pay her college expenses. After two years of study spent in this college, Cordelia, through the influence of Doctor Henry Foster, of Clifton Springs Sanitarium, obtained an opportunity to assist in a large sanitarium in Cleveland, Ohio, and at the same time pursue her studies in the Western Reserve University. Her vacations were spent at the Clifton Springs Sanitarium. In 1855, she was graduated with honor from the Western Reserve University, and received her title of M.D. Her thesis, A Thesis on Prolapsus Uteri: And Other Malpositions of the Abdominal & Pelvic Viscera, was published in 1856. There were four women and fifty men in the graduating class. Cordelia's friendship with two of them, Dr. Marie Zakrzewska, of Boston, and Dr. Elizabeth Griselle, of Salem, Ohio, was life-long.

== Career ==
=== Physician ===
After a short time spent at her father's sanitarium in Castile, Dr. Greene was for six years one of the faculty of the Clifton Springs Sanitarium. Greene was not only skilful in her medical work, but she was successful in controlling and managing things about the house. She was in fellowship with Dr. Foster in his religious views and believed that a strong spiritual atmosphere was a powerful curative agent. Her prayers and remarks at sanitarium's chapel services were unusual.

In the summer of 1858, Dr. Greene mother became ill and was carried to Clifton Springs Sanitarium, where after months of care from her daughter, she died.

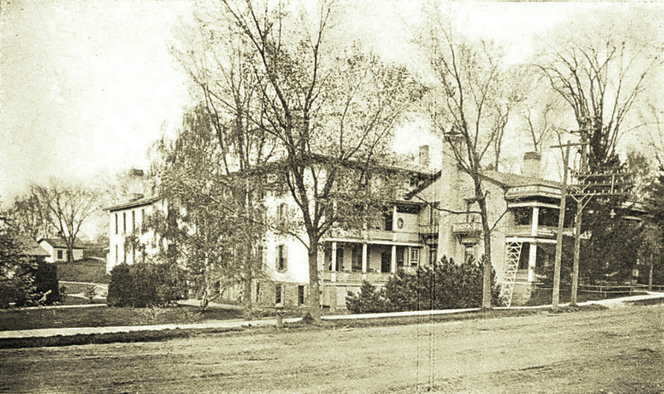
Castile Sanitarium

On the death of her father in October 1864, Greene went to Castile with her brothers and their wives. In discussing future plans, one of the brothers suggested that she should buy the home, "The Water Cure", and there continue her professional work. After buying out her brothers, on March 28, 1865, she opened the Castile Sanitarium. Twice, she enlarged the building, and she also added a gymnasium. The grounds contained trees, shrubbery, flowers, and a stream. On the 32nd anniversary of Castile Sanitarium, in 1897, Frances Willard, Anna Adams Gordon, Elizabeth Putnam Gordon and others helped make the event commemorative.

Greene published, Build Well: The Basis of Individual, Home, and National Elevation; Plain Truths Relating to the Obligations of Marriage and Parentage, in 1885. She found little time to prepare the book on hygienic living, for which there were many requests. The winter trips taken by Greene the last years of her life, accompanied by Elizabeth Gordon, were her only opportunities for writing. While in Alabama, she had the satisfaction of completing her long-desired revision of Build Well. It was written under a heavy constraint. "I closed the Sanitarium," she said, "at a financial sacrifice and sought a quiet place, staying six months, that she might write. The early spring of 1904 was spent by Greene in her private cottage, Brookside, in company with her niece, Dr. Mary T. Greene. Except in consultation she saw no patients, but prepared manuscript for her book. The Art of Keeping Well: Or, Common Sense Hygiene for Adults and Children was published posthumously in 1906.

Greene was a member of the American Medical Association, the New York State Medical Association and its Wyoming County Branch, and the Woman's Medical League of Western New York.

=== Social reformer ===
By an act of New York State Legislature passed in 1873, the State Board of Charities was empowered to appoint three or more suitable persons in any county of the State to act as visitors of the poorhouse and other charitable institutions subject to the visitation of the Board. Five years later, Greene was appointed a visitor for Wyoming County by the State Board of Charities, and she performed her duties as such for a number of years, until her other responsibilities made her resignation necessary.

Greene lectured on temperance in the Sanitarium, village and surrounding area. She inserted in the local paper a paid advertisement written from a medical standpoint, showing the harm that comes even to the moderate drinker. During her stay in another town, Greene sent a scientific temperance statement to a local paper. A few weeks before her death, Greene attended the annual convention of the National Woman's Christian Temperance Union (W.C.T.U.), held in Philadelphia. It was gratifying to the president and vice-president, Lillian M. N. Stevens and Anna Adams Gordon, to have Greene with them on the platform and introduce her as one of their distinguished guests before Greene gave her speech, emphasizing total abstinence and non-alcoholic medication. Greene's last addresses were given to the soldier at Fort Myer and Fort Washington. "The Perils of Moderate Drinking", her last brochure, was widely circulated, and her scientific articles on the subject of alcoholic disease were published in leading papers, including the New York Medical Record.

It was an eventful moment in the history of the Castile Town Board when the largest tax payer, Greene, said,— "Gentlemen, taxation without representation is tyranny." She was for nearly a year the president of the Political Equality Club, organized in the Sanitarium parlors, later becoming its honorary president, also honorary president of the Wyoming County Suffrage Association. Susan B. Anthony, who first met Greene at the Clifton Springs Sanitarium, was a congenial friend. In the spring of 1897, a distinguished trio met in a cottage near the Sanitarium, Susan B. Anthony, Frances E. Willard, and Cordelia A. Greene, to discuss women's suffrage from multiple points of view.

=== Benefactor ===
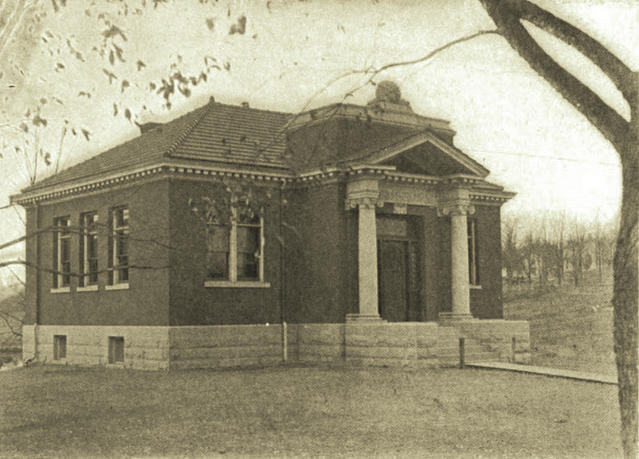
Cordelia A. Greene Library

After Greene made a gift of US$500 to the town of Castile for books, the Cordelia A. Greene Library formally opened on March 9, 1897. It was housed temporarily in the town hall, for the permanent use of which she paid US$1,000.

On August 11, 1902, the cornerstone of the Cordelia A. Greene Library was laid, and on December 24, 1902, the new building was formally dedicated. On the completion of the fire-proof building, a transfer of the books occurred. The land on which the library building stands was a gift from Greene. She spent hundreds of dollars beautifying the grounds. Greene's endowment of US$15,000 paid the running expenses and bought new books.

== Personal life ==
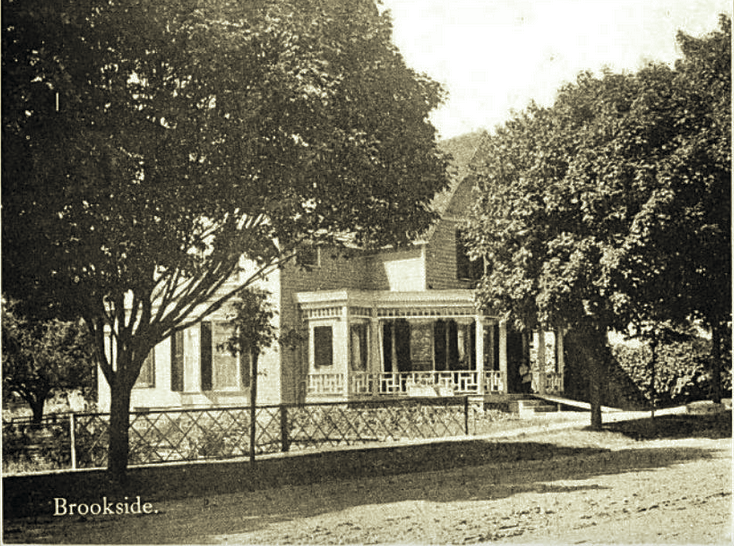
Brookside, Greene's home

Greene never married. She adopted six children, four of whom outlived her.

In 1891, in company with her daughter, Marguerite, she sailed from New York City to San Francisco, making the trip across the Isthmus of Panama. In September, 1892, with Mr. and Mrs. Frank Greene and Mrs. Elizabeth B. Greene, Dr. Greene took her second journey to the Pacific coast, visiting Yellowstone National Park. In 1896, accompanied by her niece, Dr. Mary T. Greene, she made a memorable trip to the Hawaiian Islands.

A part of the winter of 1901, Greene spent in Lyons, her birthplace, in the home of her old school-mate, Marie Rogers Bostwick. Twice, Greene spent a part of her winter vacation in the South with her friends, Mr. and Mrs. Edward N. Pierce of Plainville, Connecticut, whose winter residence, The Oaks, at Mount Meigs, Alabama, was a typical Southern plantation.

In 1904, during her last busy summer, she worked as many hours a day as usual and did some of her best medical work. At the request of the Loyal Temperance Legion Flower Mission, Greene and her pet horse Mink visited all the vegetable and flower gardens the young people had planted, and at the Harvest Home Festival, Greene gave out prizes. In November of that year, she left home for a three month stay in Philadelphia, Washington, D.C., and New York City. In this last city, she had been living for a few weeks with Elizabeth Gordon at Miller's Hotel, engaged in literary work. Greene became ill on January 24, 1905, and was removed to the Presbyterian Hospital. Cordelia A. Greene died at the hospital on January 28, 1905, a few hours after a surgical operation.

Greene's biography, The Story of the Life and Work of Cordelia A. Greene, M.D., was published posthumously in 1925, by Elizabeth Putnam Gordon.

== Selected works ==
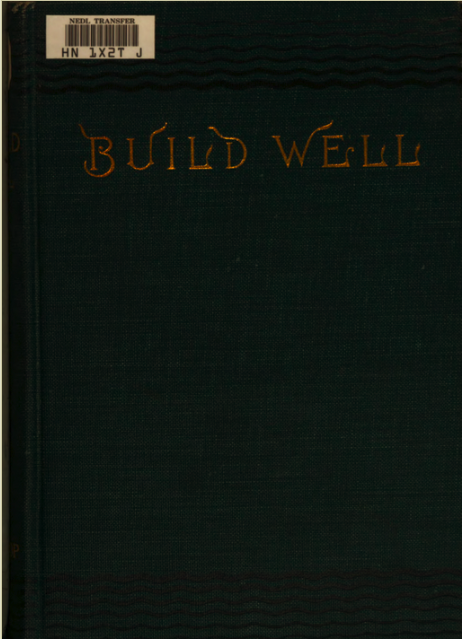
Build Well (1885)

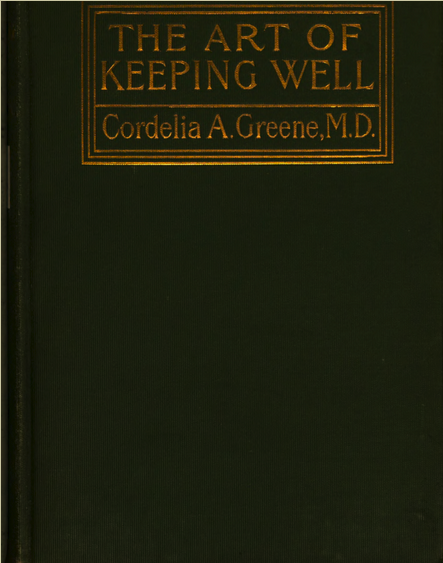
The Art of Keeping Well (1906)

- Build Well: The Basis of Individual, Home, and National Elevation; Plain Truths Relating to the Obligations of Marriage and Parentage, 1885 (Text)
- Golden Anniversary 1849–1899: June the Twelfth : Castile, N.Y., 1899 (Text)
- The Art of Keeping Well: Or, Common Sense Hygiene for Adults and Children, 1906 (Text)
- The Castile Sanitarium Cook Book, 1911 (Text)

=== Brochures ===
- "The Perils of Moderate Drinking"
