= Neurocardiology =

Discipline within medical science

Neurocardiology is the study of the neurophysiological, neurological and neuroanatomical aspects of cardiology, including the neurological origins of cardiac disorders. The effects of stress on the heart are studied in terms of the heart's interactions with both the peripheral nervous system and the central nervous system.

Clinical issues in neurocardiology include hypoxic–ischemic brain injury, neurogenic stress cardiomyopathy, cerebral embolism, encephalopathy, neurologic sequelae of cardiac and thoracic surgery and cardiac interventions, and cardiovascular findings in patients with primary neurological disease.

== Overview ==
Neurocardiology refers to study of the pathophysiological interactions between the nervous and cardiovascular systems. The communication between the heart and the brain have proved invaluable to the interdisciplinary fields of neurological and cardiac diseases.

The fundamental understanding of the communication between the heart and the brain via the nervous system has led scientists towards an understanding of its elaborate circuitry. The brain emits neurological signals of oscillating frequencies. The neural rhythms provide information on the steady-state conditions of healthy individuals. Variations in the neural rhythms provide evidence that a problem is present regarding physiologic regulation and help physicians to more quickly determine the underlying condition based on the given symptoms.

The neurocardiac axis links the cardiovascular and nervous systems to physiological problems such as arrhythmias, epilepsy and stroke. These problems are related to the fundamental factor of stress on the body. As stated previously, the changes in neural oscillations can contribute to the knowledge of what a steady state in an individual looks like, especially because it changes based on the person, as well as contributing to the imbalance of the nervous system and physiological function. Moreover, the brain can control the heart rate through the sympathetic nervous system.

== Map between cardiovascular system and nervous system ==
The cardiovascular system is regulated by the autonomic nervous system, which includes the sympathetic and parasympathetic nervous systems. A distinct balance between these systems is crucial for the pathophysiology of cardiovascular disease. An imbalance can be caused by hormone levels, lifestyle, environmental stressors and injuries.

The complicated link between the brain and the heart can be mapped out from the complex of higher nervous system influences descending down to the heart. This complex innervates key autonomic structures from the brain's cortex to the heart along the neurocardiac axis. The heart is both the source of life and a source of cardiac arrhythmias and complications. The information originates in the brain's cortex and descends down to the hypothalamus. The neural signals are then transferred to the brainstem, followed by the spinal cord—the location from which the heart receives all its signals. In further detail, the heart receives its neural input through parasympathetic and sympathetic ganglia and the lateral grey column of the spinal cord.

== Problems ==
The neurocardiac axis is the link to many problems regarding the physiological functions of the body. This includes cardiac ischemia, stroke, epilepsy, heart arrhythmias and cardiac myopathies. Many of these problems are due to the imbalance of the nervous system, resulting in symptoms that affect both the heart and the brain.
The connection between the cardiovascular and nervous system has raised concerns in the training processes for medical students. Neurocardiology is based on an understanding that systems within the body are interconnected. When training within one specialty, doctors are more likely to associate patients' symptoms with their field. Without taking integration into account, doctors can consequently delay a correct diagnosis and treatment for the patient. However, by specializing in a field, advancement in medicine continues as new findings come into perspective.

=== Stress ===
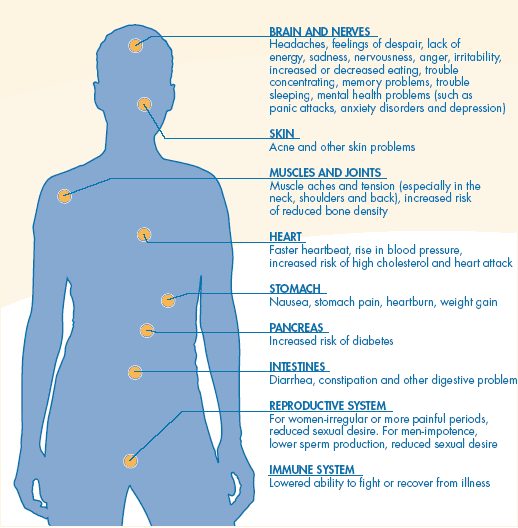
The physiological effects of stress on the body

Cardiovascular systems are regulated by the autonomic nervous system, which includes the sympathetic and parasympathetic nervous systems. A distinct balance between these two systems is crucial for the pathophysiology of cardiovascular disease. Chronic stress has been widely studied for its effects on the body, resulting in an elevated heart rate (HR), reduced HR variability, elevated sympathetic tone and intensified cardiovascular activity. Consequently, stress promotes an autonomic imbalance in favor of the sympathetic nervous system. The activation of the sympathetic nervous system contributes to endothelial dysfunction, hypertension, atherosclerosis, insulin resistance and increased incidence of arrhythmias. An imbalance in the autonomic nervous system has been documented in mood disorders; it is commonly regarded as a mediator between mood disorders and cardiovascular disorders.

The hypothalamus is the part of the brain that regulates function and responds to stress. When the brain perceives environmental danger, the amygdala fires a nerve impulse to the hypothalamus to initiate the body's fight-or-flight mode through the sympathetic nervous system. The stress response starts with the hypothalamus stimulating the pituitary gland, which releases the adrenocorticotropic hormone. This signals the release of cortisol, the stress hormone, initiating a multitude of physical effects on the body to aid in survival. A negative feedback loop is then needed to return the body to its resting state by signaling the parasympathetic nervous system.

Prolonged stress leads to many hazards within the nervous system. Various hormones and glands become overworked, and chemical waste is produced, resulting in the degeneration of nerve cells. The result of prolonged stress is the breakdown of the body and the nervous system. Stress alone does not produce potentially deadly arrhythmias in normal healthy hearts; however, studies do appear to show that stress causes cardiac damage that may lead to arrhythmias.

=== Arrhythmias ===
In a study relating to the relationship between neurocardiology and arrhythmias and sudden cardiac death, the authors hypothesized that an individual with a diseased heart has a greater likelihood of experiencing cardiac arrhythmias and sudden cardiac death when the neurocardiac axis is activated. An arrhythmia is defined as any disturbance in the cardiac activation sequence or any deviation from accepted limits for the rate or regularity of the normal impulse. The main types of arrhythmias leading to sudden cardiac death are tachyarrhythmias and bradyarrhythmia. Tachyarrhythmias are associated with ventricular fibrillation and ventricular tachycardia. Bradyarrhythmias are associated with complete atrioventricular blockage and sudden asystole. The underlying cause of sudden cardiac death is unclear, despite the understanding that heart disease causes arrhythmias, which in turn produce sudden cardiac death. Lown describes the heart as the target, and the brain as the trigger. If a sudden cardiac death is triggered by an electrical accident, it can be treated with ventricular defibrillation.

=== Stroke ===
Stroke activates the neurocardiac axis, producing arrhythmias, cardiac damage, and sudden death. In a recent study on patients with already diseased hearts and electrocardiographic abnormalities, there was evidence of lost hypothalamic–medullary integration at the midbrain. This resulted in the observation that overactivity in the parasympathetic nervous system may also cause sudden death with asystole after stroke. Catecholamine medications have been studied for their ability to mediate the effects of electrocardiographic changes and heart damage.

=== Epilepsy ===
Sudden death from epilepsy is not very common, with a rate of approximately two cases in every thousand. The present understanding about how sudden cardiac death can result from epilepsy is that the brain stimulates an arrhythmia. Recordings during seizures report that the onset of tachycardia just prior to the seizure is common, with both atrial and ventricular ectopy. A sudden epileptic death may be a result of the sympathetic activation or autonomic imbalance of the nervous system, as described earlier.

=== Emotions ===
The relationship between emotions and their effect on the destabilization of the heart continues to be a mystery. It is considered that both the spatial and temporal patterns of autonomic input to the heart play a key role in altered electrophysiological parameters. The body continually attempts to maintain homeostasis through the baroreflex. This balance in the autonomic neural input to the heart in response to the pressure and volume changes leads to alterations in the baroreceptors.

== Treatments ==
=== Medications ===
Drugs with both antidepressant and cardiometabolic actions are in the process of being studied. Most medications work on stressors of the heart and some also work to treat neuropsychiatric diseases. Antidepressant medications have shown to be insufficient to induce the normalization of cardiovascular dysfunctions, which are associated with psychiatric conditions.

- Hypercatecholaminergic medications
  - Adrenoreceptor blockers (alpha and beta)
    They are most commonly used to treat hypercatecholaminergic states. Overall, adrenoreceptor blockers reduce the incidence of long-term disease. The blockade not only affects cardiomyocytes directly but also works to reduce the risk of heart failure and hypertension. One side effect is the potential activation of pulmonary edema in patients with unstable hearts. In particular, beta-blockers are used for the management of cardiac arrhythmias. They link the brain and the cardiovascular system in cardiovascular diseases. Beta-blockers have also been studied in depressed patients. A meta-analysis concluded that with anti-depressant medication, a percentage of patients in remission from depressive symptoms significantly improved with anti-depressants alone. This suggests that this type of medication might be beneficial in treating both the behavioral and cardiovascular symptoms of depression.
  - Aldosterone antagonist
    - Spironolactone
      This medication acts by inhibiting binding to mineralocorticoid receptors. This has shown positive feedback in tackling both cardiovascular symptoms and the activation of the main feature of stress-related disorders. Aldosterone antagonists are usually used in combination with other cardiac medications, but appear to induce favorable sympathovagal balance. Some side effects of spironolactone are hyperkalemia, erectile dysfunction, lower testosterone levels and menstrual irregularities, all of which lead to an increase in noncompliance with the medication.
  - Adrenoreceptor agonist
    - Clonidine
      Clonidine acts on the central nervous system to inhibit the sympathetic nervous system, leading to a decrease in blood pressure. It is commonly used to reduce the risk of stroke and heart attacks by treating high blood pressure, anxiety and panic disorders. It also leads to decreased norepinephrine release from the sympathetic nerve terminals.

=== Physical activity and diet ===
Lifestyle modifications play a crucial role in the management of cardiovascular and neurological diseases. Physical activity and a well-balanced diet favor cardiovascular conditioning and improve performance and capacity. Exercise has a positive effect on the metabolism, which controls glucose levels, especially for stress-related pathology and brain disorders such as depression, which impose a heavy burden on the cardiovascular system. Many studies are currently being conducted to gather more information regarding the common mediators of cardiovascular disease and the central nervous system. The brain–heart interaction is considered bidirectional; however, the central nervous system is often regulated more strongly than the heart and blood vessels.

== See also ==
- Autonomic nervous system
- Cardiology
- Cardiovascular system
- Central nervous system
- Neurology
- Peripheral nervous system
