= 1868 United States presidential election in Rhode Island =

- November 3, 1868
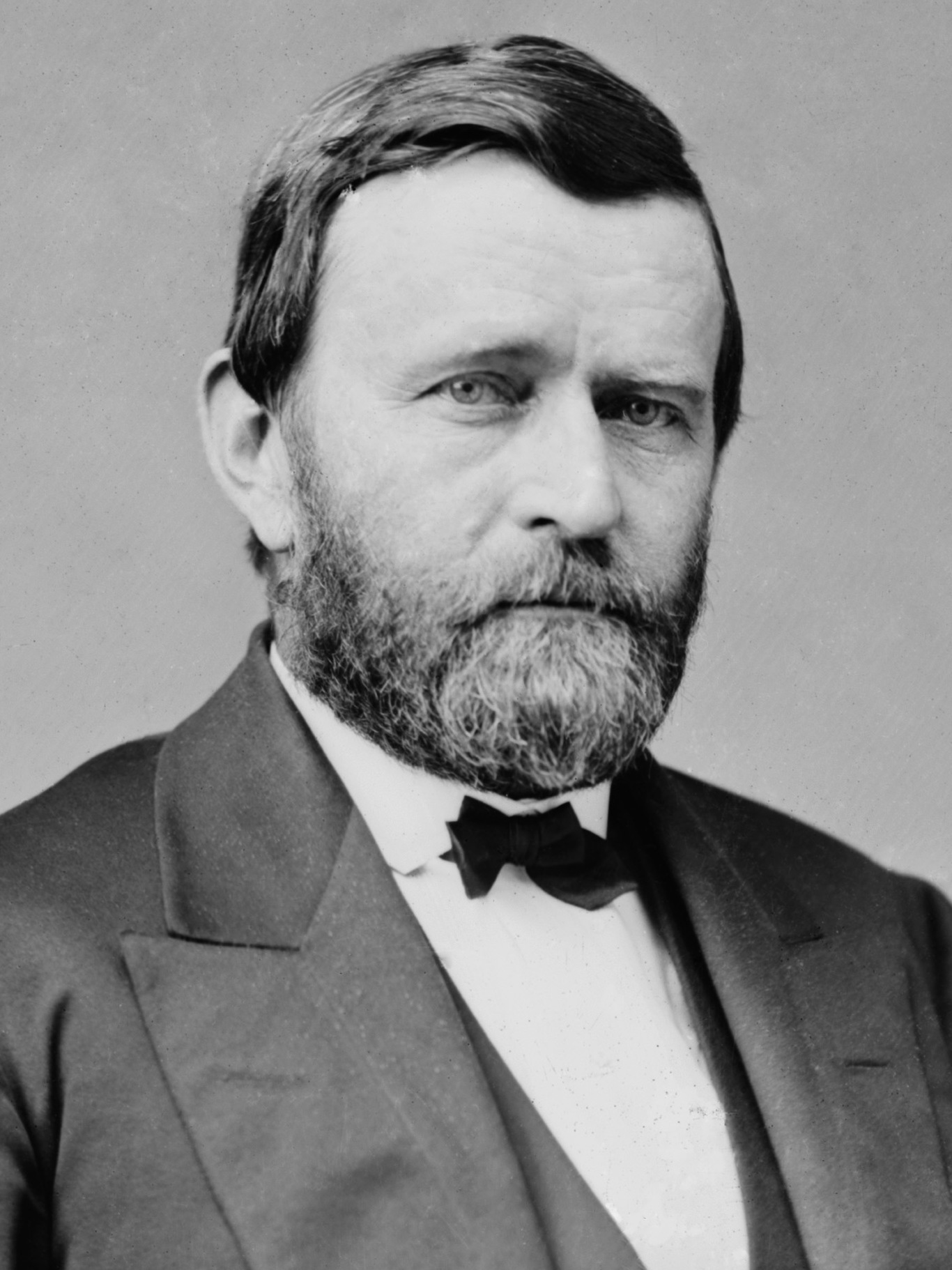

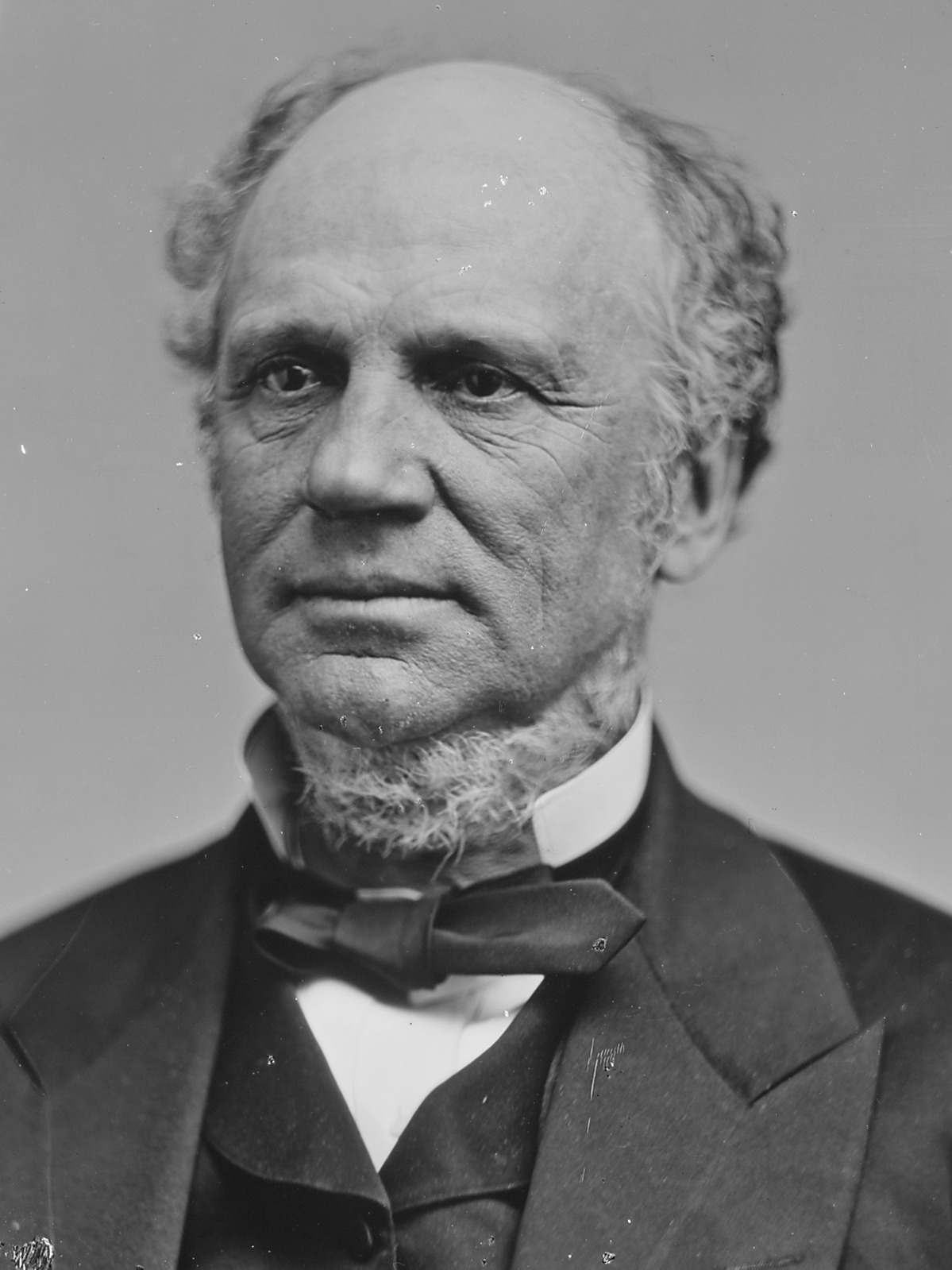
Nominee	Ulysses S. Grant	Horatio Seymour
Party	Republican	Democratic
Home state	Illinois	New York
Running mate	Schuyler Colfax	Francis Preston Blair Jr.
Electoral vote	4	0
Popular vote	12,993	6,548
Percentage	66.49%	33.51%
County results
Grant
60–70%
70–80%
President before election
Andrew Johnson
Democratic
Elected President
Ulysses S. Grant
Republican

The 1868 United States presidential election in Rhode Island took place on November 3, 1868, as part of the 1868 United States presidential election. Voters chose four representatives, or electors to the Electoral College, who voted for president and vice president.

Rhode Island voted for the Republican nominee, Ulysses S. Grant, over the Democratic nominee, Horatio Seymour. Grant won the state by a margin of 32.98%.

With 66.49% of the popular vote, Rhode Island would be Grant's fifth strongest victory in terms of popular vote percentage after Vermont, Massachusetts, Kansas and Tennessee.

== Results ==
1868 United States presidential election in Rhode Island
Party	Candidate	Running mate	Popular vote		Electoral vote	
Party	Candidate	Running mate	Count	%	Count	%
Republican	Ulysses S. Grant of Illinois	Schuyler Colfax of Indiana	12,993	66.49%	4	100.00%
Democratic	Horatio Seymour of New York	Francis Preston Blair Jr. of Missouri	6,548	33.51%	0	0.00%
Total			19,541	100.00%	4	100.00%

== See also ==
- United States presidential elections in Rhode Island
