= Horatio Seymour 1868 presidential campaign =

American political campaign

Horatio Seymour for President
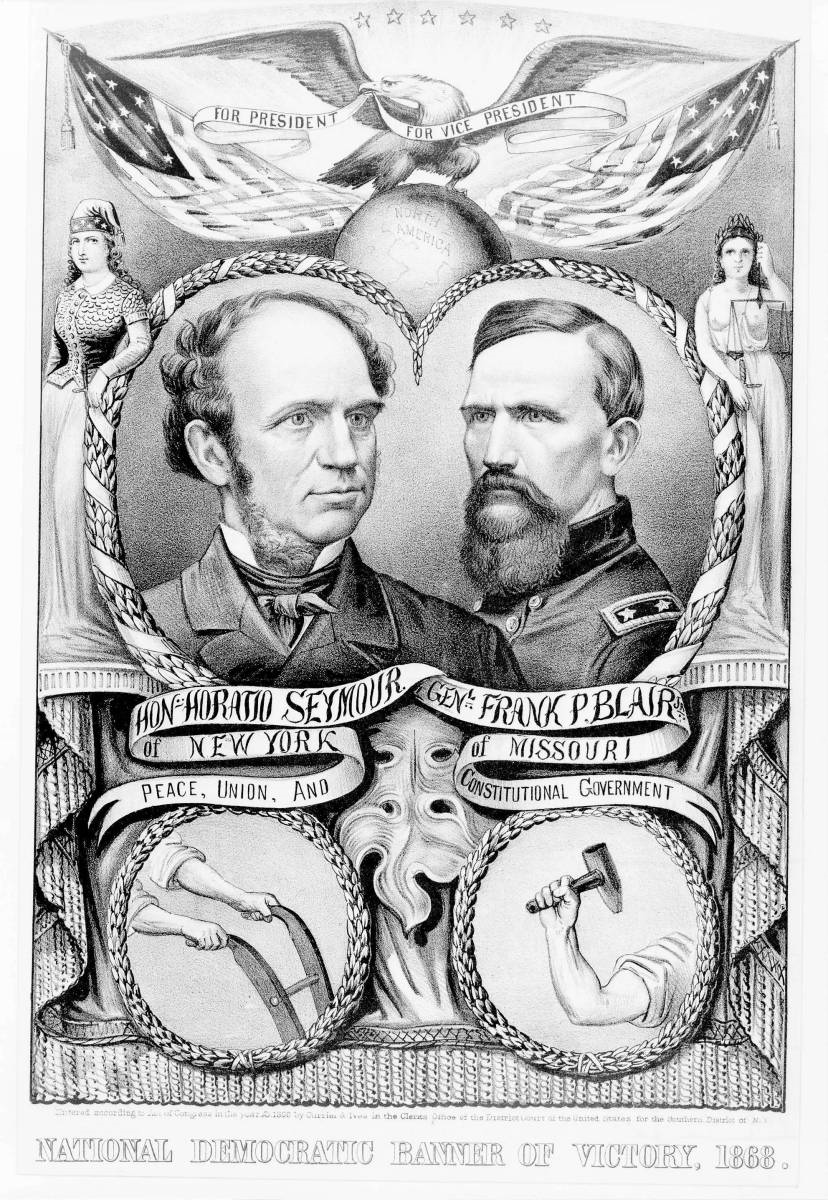
- Campaign: U.S. presidential election, 1868
- Candidate: Horatio Seymour; 18th Governor of New York (1853–1854, 1863–1864); Francis Preston Blair Jr. U.S. Representative for Missouri's 1st district (1857–1859)
- Affiliation: Democratic Party
- Status: Lost general election: November 3, 1868
- Slogan(s): Peace, Union, and constitutional government.

In 1868, the Democrats nominated former New York Governor Horatio Seymour for President and Francis Preston Blair Jr. (a Representative from Missouri) for Vice President. The Seymour-Blair ticket ran on a platform which supported national reconciliation and states' rights, opposed Reconstruction, and opposed both Black equality and Black suffrage. Meanwhile, the Republican presidential ticket led by General Ulysses S. Grant benefited from Grant's status as a war hero (for winning the American Civil War) and ran on a pro-Reconstruction (and pro-Fourteenth Amendment) platform. Ultimately, the Seymour-Blair ticket ended up losing to the Republican ticket of General Ulysses S. Grant and House Speaker Schuyler Colfax in the 1868 U.S. presidential election.

== Background ==
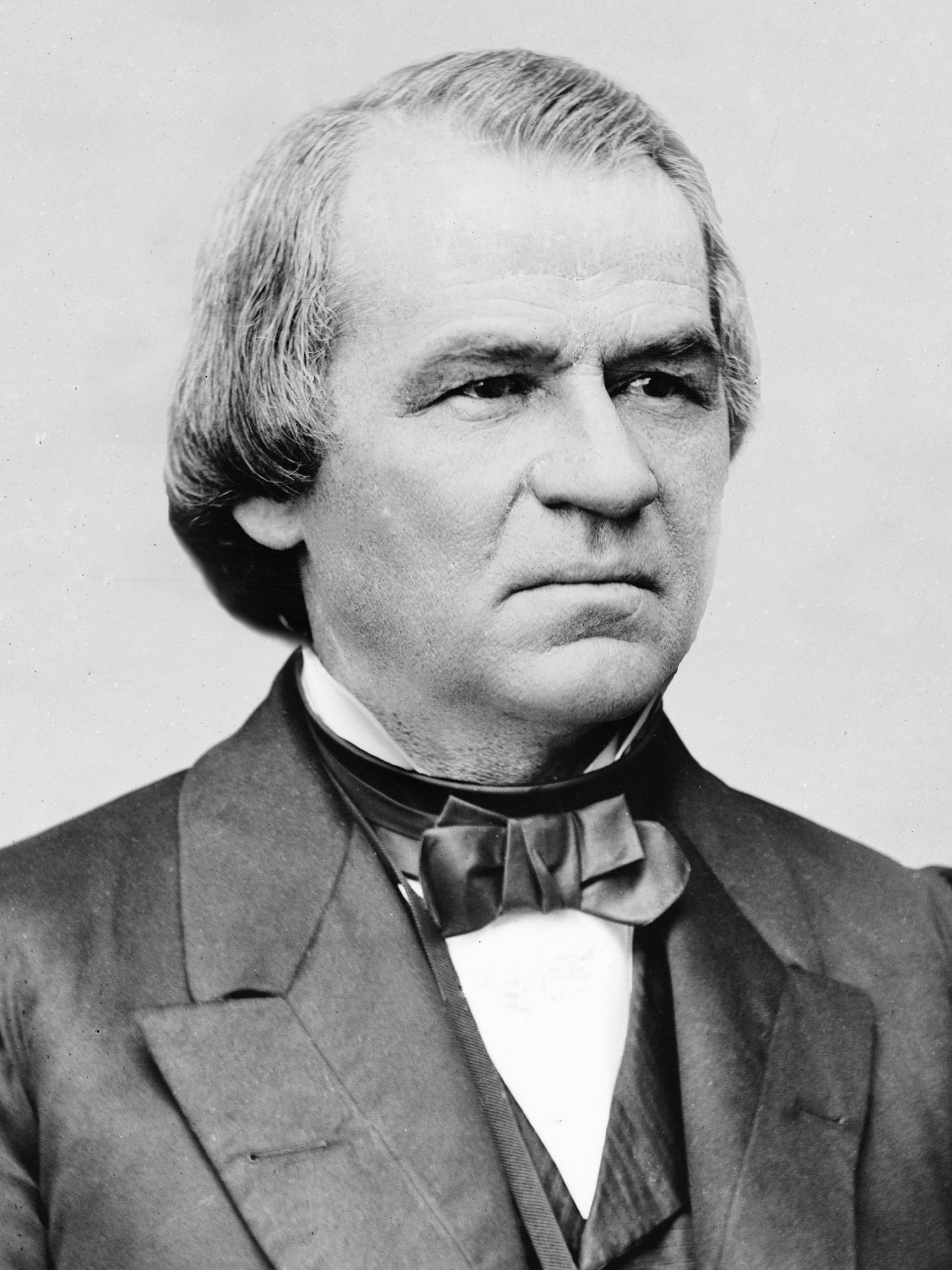
Andrew Johnson was the incumbent U.S. president in 1868 and made an unsuccessful bid for the 1868 Democratic presidential nomination.

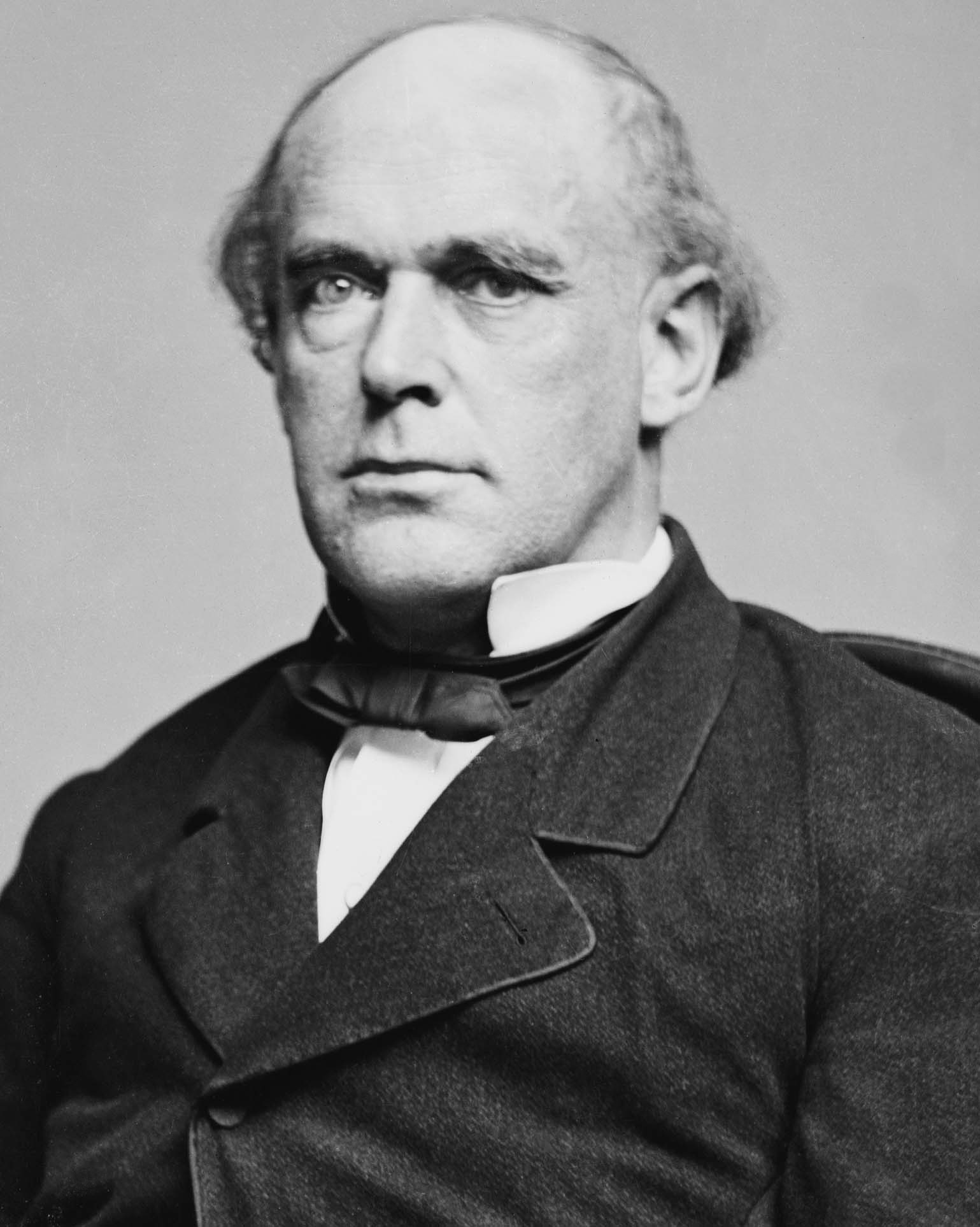
United States Chief Justice Salmon P. Chase was a prominent early contender for the 1868 Democratic presidential nomination.

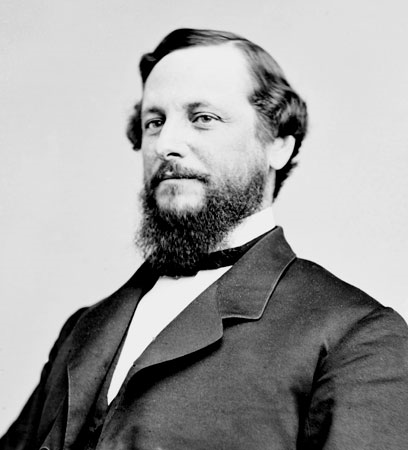
1864 Democratic vice-presidential nominee George Pendleton initially led in the delegate count at the 1868 Democratic National Convention.

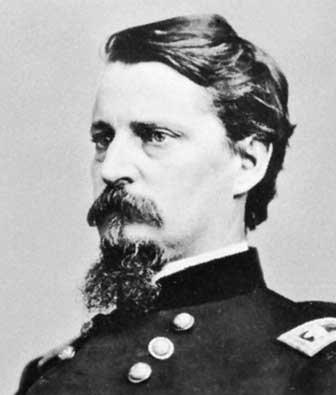
For a time, General Winfield Scott Hancock led in the balloting at the 1868 Democratic National Convention.

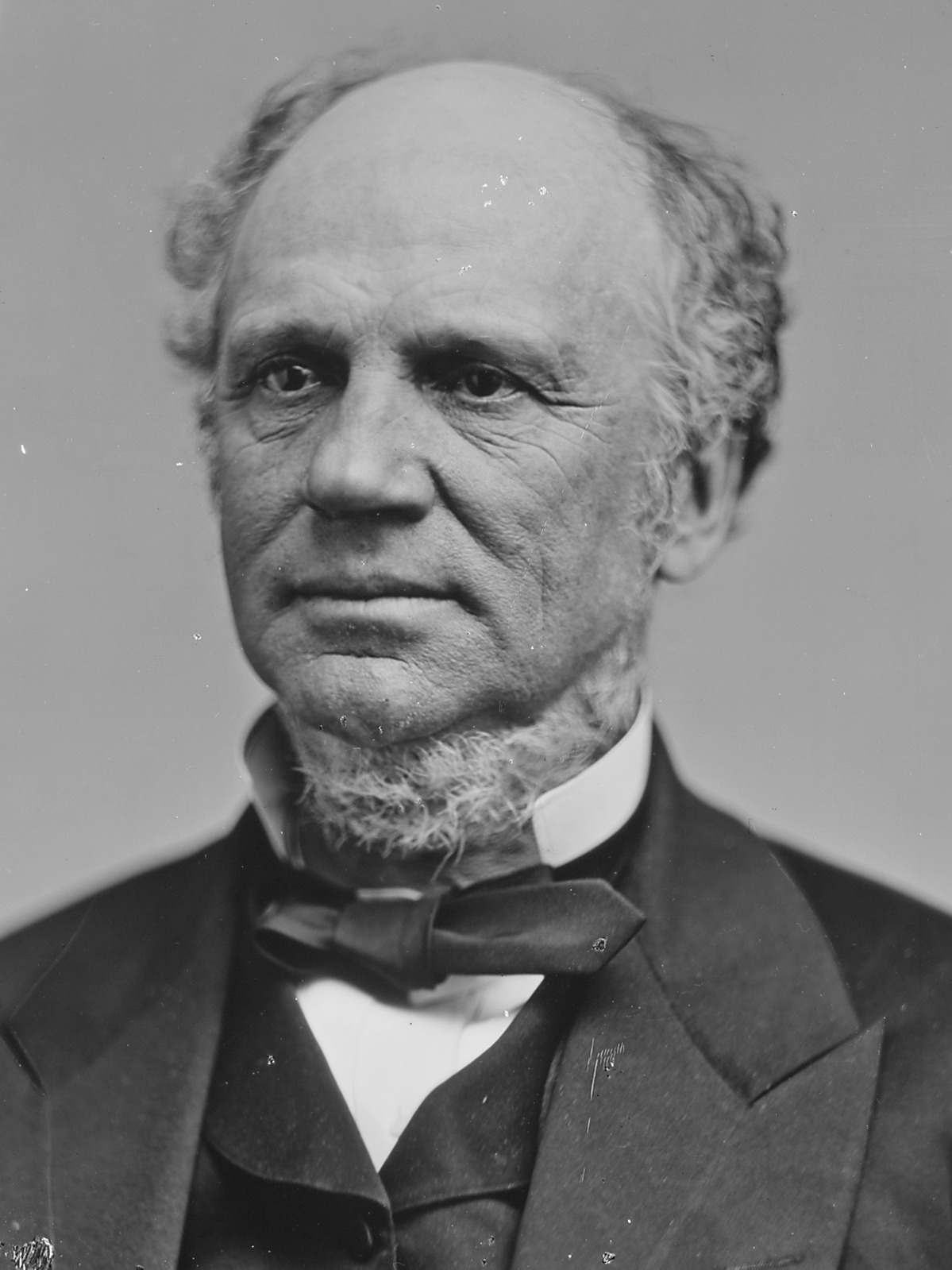
1868 Democratic presidential nominee and former New York Governor Horatio Seymour.

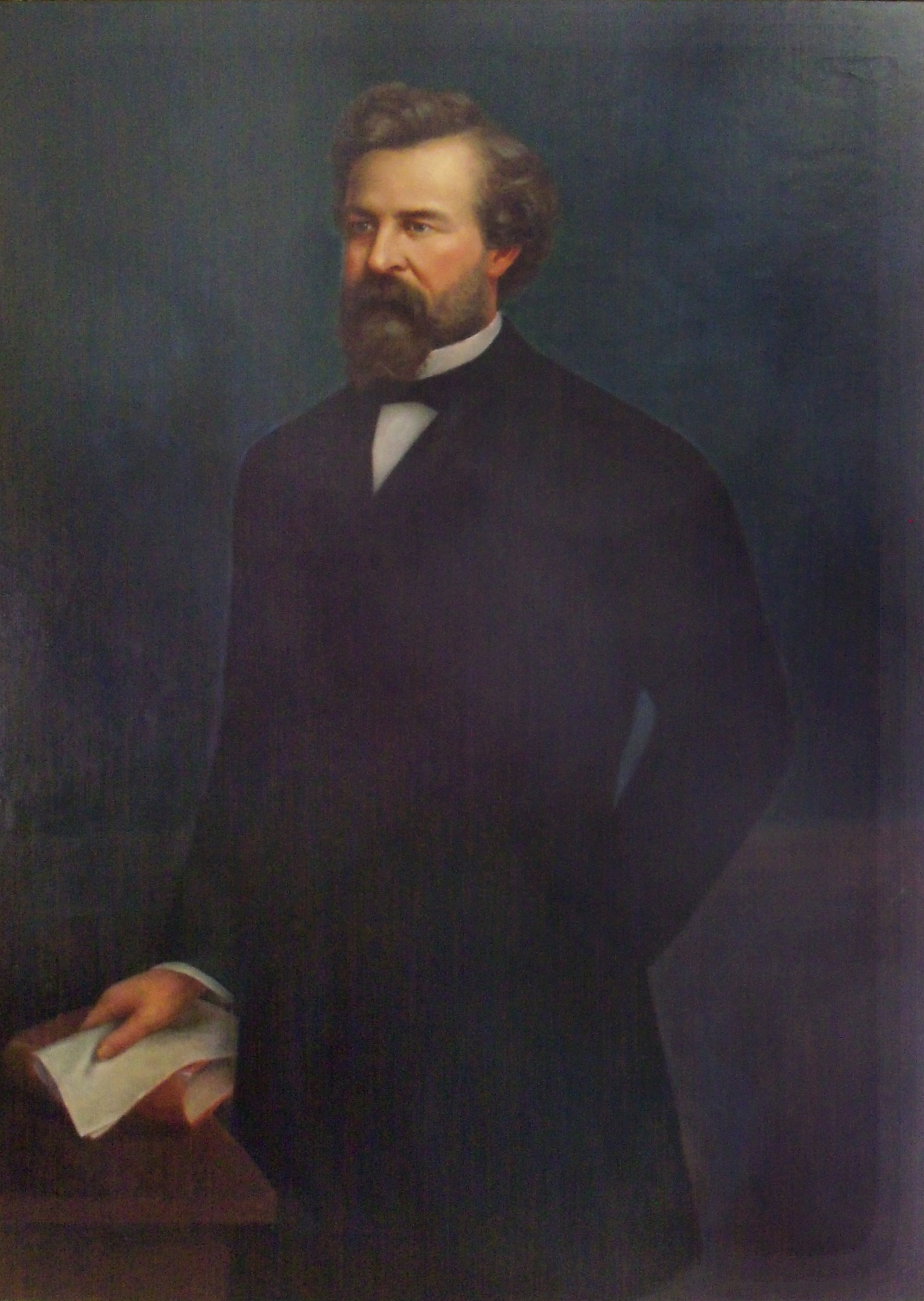
George McCook nominated Horatio Seymour as a compromise candidate for the Democrats in 1868.

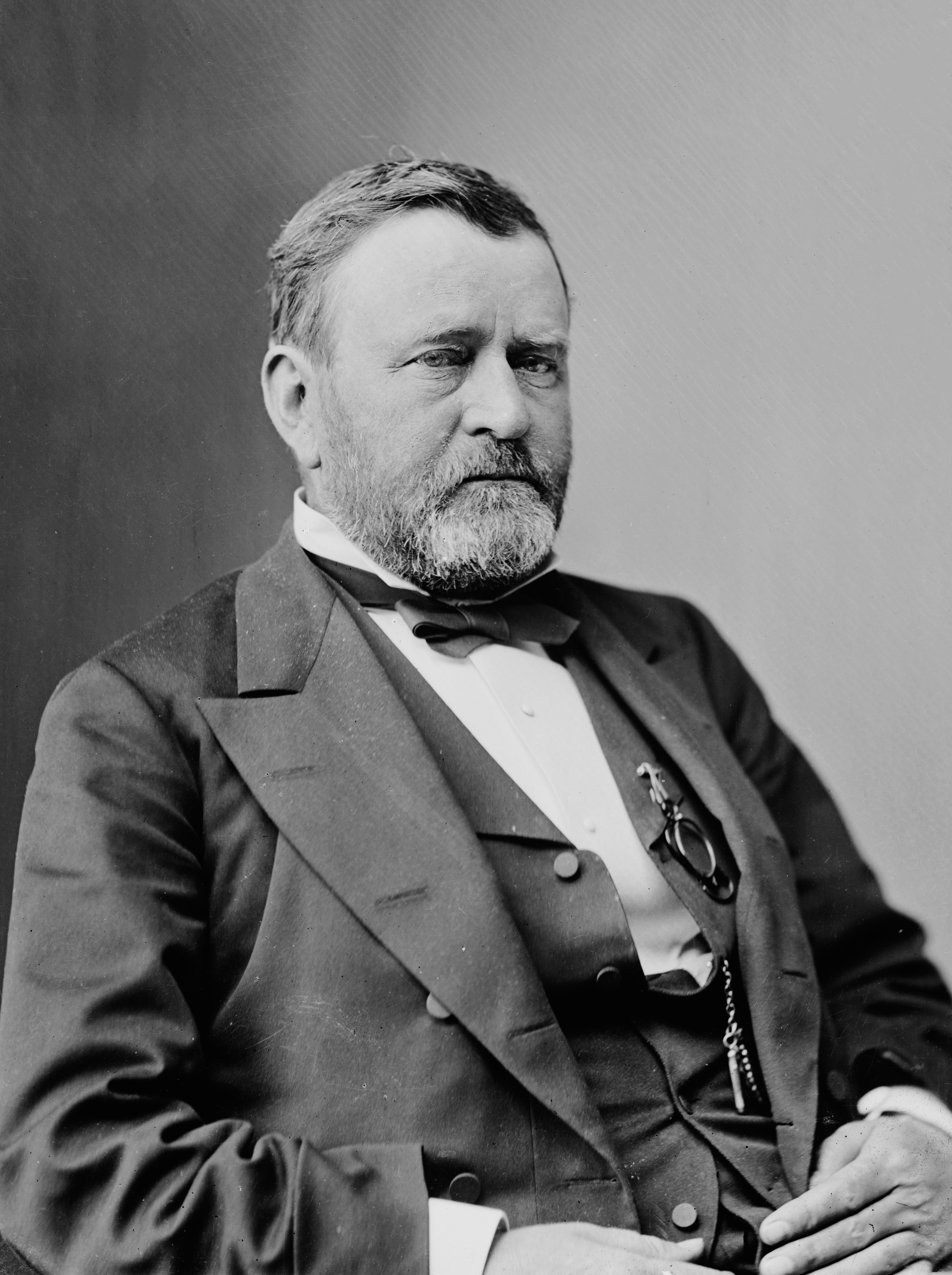
1868 Republican presidential nominee and former Union General Ulysses S. Grant.

A map of the results of the 1868 U.S. presidential election. In this election, Grant decisively won the electoral vote.

The 1868 election occurred three years after the end of the American Civil War and less than a year after President Andrew Johnson's impeachment (Johnson failed to get convicted by one vote). In addition, during the 1868 campaign season, the Fourteenth Amendment was ratified in order to secure basic rights for newly freed African-Americans. Some controversy was generated due to the fact that the Republican U.S. Congress made ratification of the Fourteenth Amendment a precondition for the former Confederate states to rejoin the Union.

== The run-up to the 1868 Democratic National Convention ==
After the 1866 elections, some prominent Democrats considered nominating General Ulysses S. Grant as the Democratic nominee for U.S. president in 1868. However, this idea was dropped after Grant made it clear that he did not want to be associated with the Democratic Party. The Democrats then turned to their 1864 vice presidential nominee and former Ohio Congressman George H. Pendleton. Pendleton – the initial frontrunner for the 1868 Democratic presidential nomination – was a principled opponent of U.S. President Abraham Lincoln during the American Civil War, was noted for his intelligence and civility, and had a lot of support in the Western United States. What ultimately doomed Pendleton's bid was his "soft money views" and specifically his support of printing more money in order to spur inflation so that debtors can have some relief. Thus, some Democrats searched for a "hard money" alternative (specifically someone who supported the gold standard) to Pendleton – with Indiana Senator Thomas A. Hendricks being a possible contender for this role.

Another prominent candidate for the 1868 Democratic presidential nomination was Chief Justice Salmon P. Chase. While Chase won the support of Democrats such as Congressmen S. S. "Sunset" Cox of New York and Daniel Voorhees of Indiana, what ultimately doomed his bid was his support of Black manhood suffrage and other basic rights for African-Americans. Other Democratic presidential candidates in 1868 included Senator James Doolittle of Wisconsin, Governor Joel Parker of New Jersey, Governor James English of Connecticut, General Winfield Scott Hancock of Pennsylvania (who ultimately ended up becoming the Democratic presidential nominee in 1880), former Lieutenant Governor Sanford Church of New York, and former Congressman and railroad president Asa Packer of Pennsylvania. In addition, incumbent U.S. President Andrew Johnson attempted to secure conservative support for getting the 1868 Democratic presidential nomination. However, many of President Johnson's initial supporters abandoned him as a result of his 1868 impeachment.

== The 1868 Democratic National Convention ==
On July 4, 1868, the 1868 Democratic National Convention opened in the new Tammany Hall building in New York City. New York Governor Horatio Seymour, who first supported Thomas A. Hendricks and then Salmon P. Chase for the 1868 Democratic presidential nomination, was selected as the chairman of this convention. The 1868 Democratic Party platform accepted the demise of both slavery and secession, but also demanded the end of Reconstruction by calling for the return of authority to the states, the non-renewal of the Freedmen’s Bureau, amnesty for all former Confederates, and the withdrawal of the U.S. military from the Southern United States. The platform also accused the Republicans – "the Radical party" – of violating the constitutional rights of the Southern states and of subjecting them to "military despotism and Negro supremacy."

On the first ballot, George Pendleton led with 105 votes to President Johnson's 65, Sanford Church's 34, and General Hancock's 33.5. For the next several ballots, Pendleton increased his support among the delegates while Hancock moved into a distant second place and while Hendricks moved into third place. Meanwhile, support for President Johnson dwindled until it disappeared on the 14th ballot. On the seventh and eighth ballots, Pendleton peaked at 156.5 delegates – which caused New York's delegation to switch their support from favorite son Sanford Church to Thomas Hendricks. As Pendleton's support collapsed, Hendricks took the lead for a while but was unable to sustain it after General Winfield Scott Hancock's home state of Pennsylvania added its delegates to his column – thus allowing Hancock to overtake Hendricks and to take the lead for the first time. Ultimately, Hancock led through the 21st ballot. Meanwhile, Salmon Chase’s name was put into nomination on the 17th ballot and George Pendleton’s name was withdrawn on the 18th ballot.

On the 22nd ballot, General George McCook nominated former New York Governor Horatio Seymour, causing spontaneous cheering and demonstrations of approval. Seymour did not want the nomination and thus declined it, but the delegates unanimously nominated him anyway. For Seymour's running mate, the delegates unanimously voted for Missouri Congressman Francis Preston Blair Jr. (also known as Frank Blair Jr.).

== Campaign ==
The 1868 Republican presidential nominee, General Ulysses S. Grant, did not openly campaign and instead left the job to surrogates. Grant's surrogates gave stump speeches, circulated campaign pamphlets and political broadsides, rallied the voters with barbecues and torchlight parades, and organized into pro-Grant clubs like the Tanners and the Boys in Blue. The Republicans based their campaign on being the party that saved the Union, ended slavery, and began reforming the South. They argued that the election of a Democratic president would result in gridlock which would hamper Reconstruction. Meanwhile, the Democrats argued that Republicans were in favor of Black equality or even Black superiority not only in the Southern U.S., but throughout the entire United States. They also attacked the Republican-backed military rule in the Southern U.S. and argued that they were the only truly national party and thus the only party that could bring national reconciliation. The Democrats also attacked Grant as being "a besotted, uncouth, simple-minded, unprincipled, Negro-loving tyrant."

As a result of the Democrats' feeling of hopelessness, Horatio Seymour—the 1868 Democratic presidential nominee – engaged in a speaking tour near the end of the 1868 campaign. On October 21, Seymour spoke in Syracuse and later traveled to Buffalo, Philadelphia, Pittsburgh, Cleveland, Columbus, Detroit, Indianapolis, and Chicago. However, the lackluster tone and repetitiveness of Seymour's speeches did not help his case (though these speeches were praised by Democratic newspapers) and it also did not help Seymour that his running mate Blair was a loose cannon who made various gaffes – such as predicting that a Grant Presidency would transform the U.S. into a military dictatorship.

== Results ==
In the U.S. presidential election on November 3, 1868, Ulysses S. Grant defeated Horatio Seymour in the popular vote by a 53% to 47% margin and in the electoral vote by a margin of 214 to 80. 78% of the American electorate participated in this election – including 500,000 African-American men who voted for the first time in this election. While Seymour lost the election, there were some bright spots for him. Specifically, he won New Jersey, New York and Oregon and almost won California. In addition, Seymour won Kentucky, Maryland, and Delaware. In addition, Grant only managed to win the popular vote in 1868 as a result of Black suffrage. Historian Paul F. Boller Jr. wrote that "[i]t is apparent that if [Grant] had not won the 450,000 to 500,000 votes cast by the freedmen in the Southern states under military occupation, he would not have won his popular majority."

In spite of the fact that Grant won the 1868 election, the Republicans largely lost interest in Reconstruction within the next several years – thus paving the way for the eventual emergence of the Jim Crow South. On the bright side, the Republicans' victory (with the help of African-American voters) in 1868 motivated them to pass and ratify the Fifteenth Amendment which forbade discrimination in regards to the suffrage based on race, color, or former condition of servitude (though this Amendment was later largely circumvented in the former Confederate states through things such as poll taxes (including grandfather clauses) and literacy tests). This is a notable development since, just a couple of years earlier, Republicans had refused to guarantee African-American suffrage in the Fourteenth Amendment due to their belief and fear that this will prevent the Fourteenth Amendment from being ratified.
