= 1868 United States presidential election =

Election of Ulysses S. Grant

- November 3, 1868

294 members of the Electoral College 148 electoral votes needed to win
- Turnout: 80.9% (▲4.6 pp)
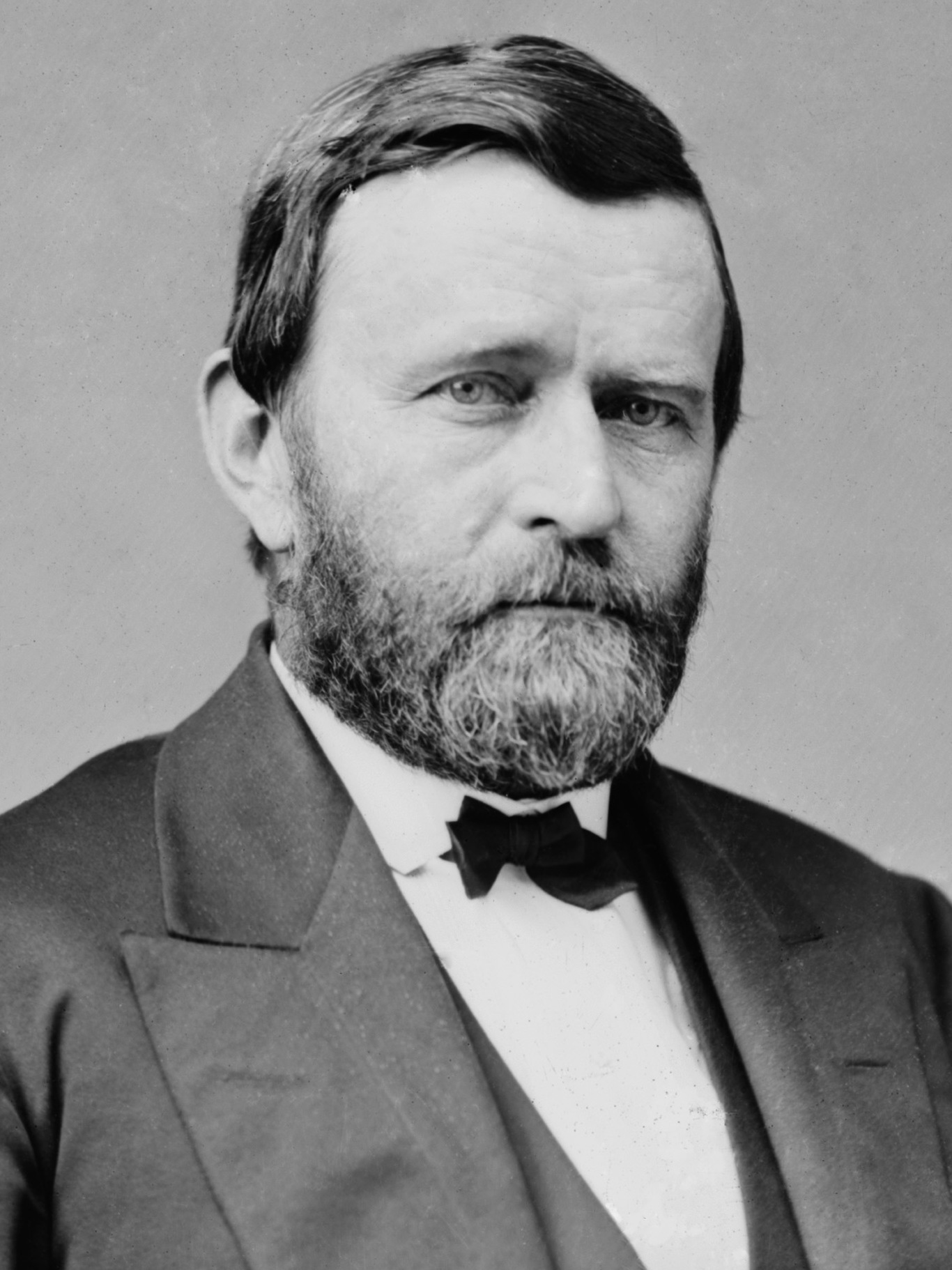

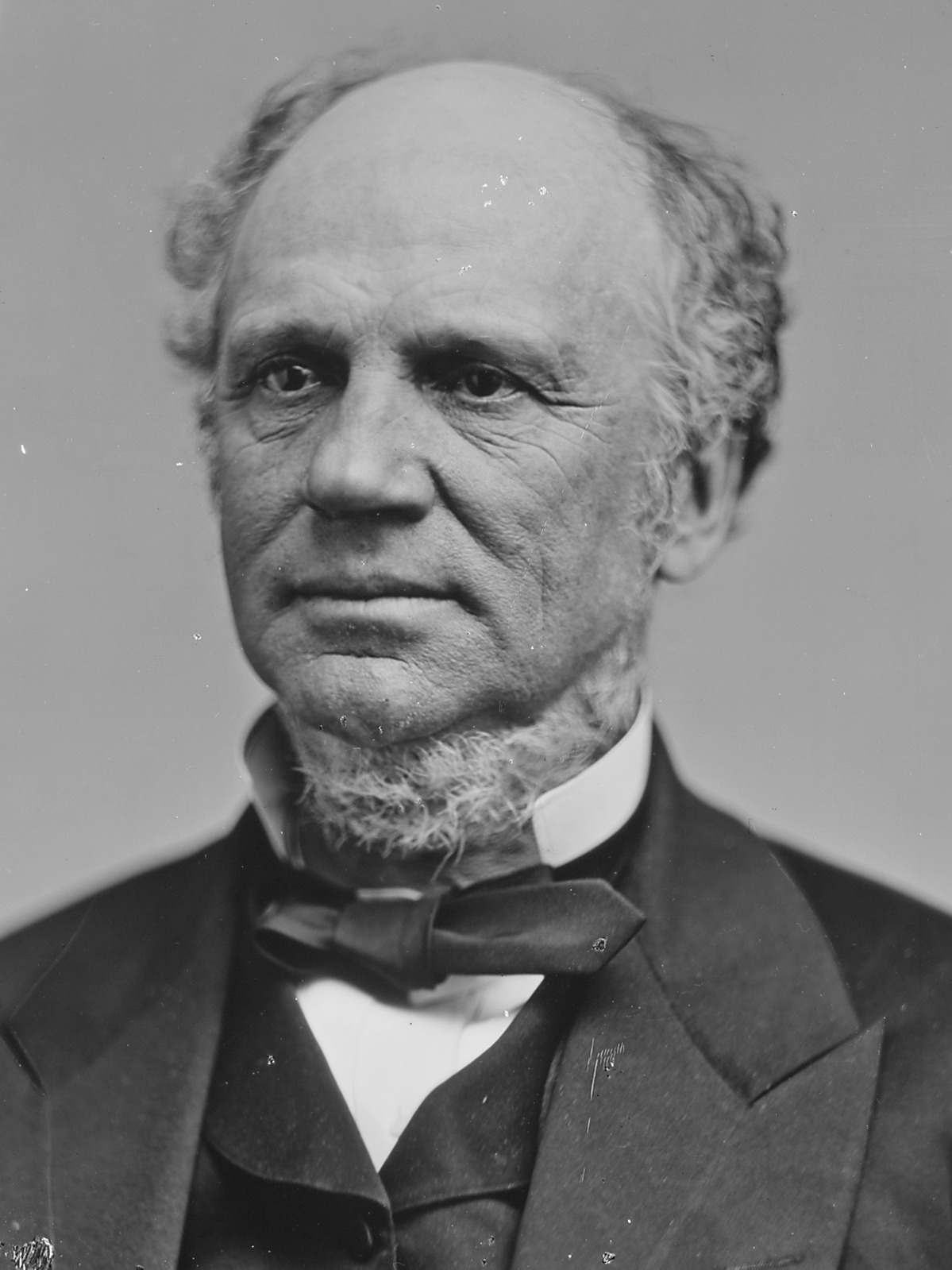
Nominee	Ulysses S. Grant	Horatio Seymour
Party	Republican	Democratic
Home state	Illinois	New York
Running mate	Schuyler Colfax	Francis Preston Blair Jr.
Electoral vote	214	80
States carried	26	8
Popular vote	3,013,421	2,706,829
Percentage	52.7%	47.3%
- Presidential election results map. Red denotes states won by Grant/Colfax, blue denotes those won by Seymour/Blair, and green denotes those states that had not yet been restored to the Union and which were therefore ineligible to vote. Numbers indicate the number of electoral votes allotted to each state.
President before election
Andrew Johnson
Democratic
Elected President
Ulysses S. Grant
Republican

A presidential election was held in the United States on November 3, 1868. In the first election of the Reconstruction Era, Republican nominee Ulysses S. Grant defeated Horatio Seymour of the Democratic Party. It was the first presidential election to take place after the conclusion of the American Civil War and the abolition of slavery. It was the first election in which African Americans could vote in the reconstructed Southern states, in accordance with the First Reconstruction Act.

Incumbent president Andrew Johnson had succeeded to the presidency in 1865 following the assassination of Abraham Lincoln, a Republican. Johnson, a War Democrat from Tennessee, had served as Lincoln's running mate in 1864 on the National Union ticket, which was designed to attract Republicans and War Democrats. Upon accession to office, Johnson clashed with the Republican Congress over Reconstruction policies and was impeached and nearly removed from office. Johnson received some support for another term at the 1868 Democratic National Convention, but, after several ballots, the convention nominated Seymour, who had formerly served as Governor of New York. The 1868 Republican National Convention unanimously nominated Grant, who had been the highest-ranking Union general at the end of the Civil War. The Democrats criticized the Republican Reconstruction policies, and "campaigned explicitly on an anti-black, pro-white platform," while Republicans campaigned on Grant's popularity and the Union victory in the Civil War.

Grant decisively won the electoral vote, but his margin was narrower in the popular vote. In addition to his appeal in the North, Grant benefited from votes among the newly enfranchised freedmen in the South, while the temporary political disfranchisement of many Southern whites helped Republican margins. As three of the former Confederate states (Texas, Mississippi, and Virginia) were not yet restored to the Union, their electors could not vote in the election. While readmitted to the Union, the presidential electors of Florida were appointed at the discretion of the state legislature rather than by popular vote.

Partly due to the exceptional circumstances of Reconstruction, this was the last time until 1912 that the Democrats carried more electoral votes from the North (46) than from the South (34), as well as the last time the Republicans did better in the popular vote in the South than in the North until 1964, due to very large majorities in reconstruction states like South Carolina and Tennessee. This was also the last time that Missouri supported the Republican candidate until 1904.

== Background ==
In the wake of the Civil War, the civil rights of former slaves were a hotly debated issue in the Union. Grant supported the Reconstruction plans of the Radical Republicans in Congress, which favored the 14th Amendment, with full citizenship and civil rights for freedmen, including suffrage (the right to vote) for former slaves. The Democratic platform denigrated such rights as "Negro supremacy," and demanded a restoration of states' rights, including the right of southern states to determine for themselves whether to allow suffrage for adult freedmen. The former Confederate States were determined to limit the civil rights of emancipated slaves, and supported the Democratic candidate.

== Nominations ==
=== Republican Party nomination ===
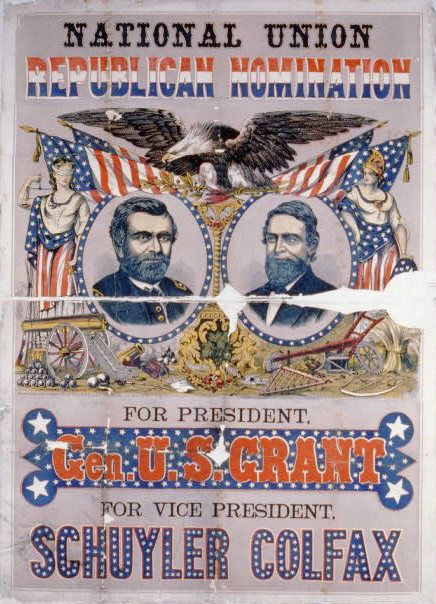
Grant/Colfax campaign poster

1868 Republican Party ticket
Ulysses S. Grant	Schuyler Colfax
for President	for Vice President
6th Commanding General of the U.S. Army (1864–1869)	25th Speaker of the House (1863–1869)

A personal history of Ulysses S. Grant, and sketch of Schuyler Colfax (1868)

By 1868, the Republicans felt strong enough to drop the Union Party label, but wanted to nominate a popular hero as their presidential candidate. General Ulysses S. Grant, widely known throughout the nation for winning the Civil War, announced he was a Republican. Grant was unanimously nominated on the first ballot as the party's standard-bearer at the Republican convention in Chicago, held on May 20–21, 1868. House Speaker Schuyler Colfax, a Radical Republican from Indiana, was nominated for vice president on the sixth ballot, surpassing early favorite, Senator Benjamin Wade of Ohio.

The Republican platform supported Black suffrage as part of the 14th Amendment's promise of full citizenship for former slaves. It opposed using greenbacks to redeem U.S. bonds, encouraged immigration, endorsed full rights for naturalized citizens, and favored Radical Reconstruction as distinct from the more lenient policies of President Andrew Johnson.

=== Democratic Party nomination ===
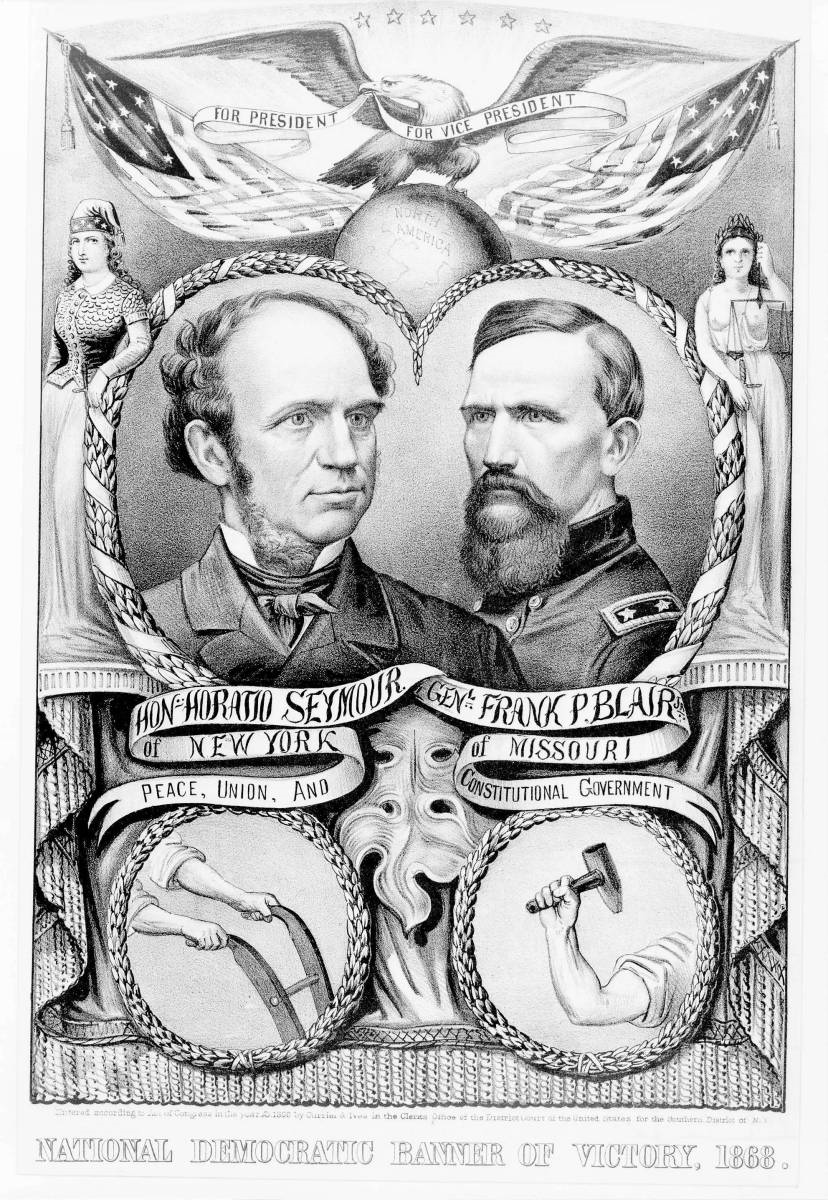
Seymour/Blair campaign poster

1868 Democratic Party ticket
Horatio Seymour	Francis Preston Blair Jr.
for President	for Vice President
18th Governor of New York (1853–1854 & 1863–1864)	U.S. Representative for Missouri's 1st (1857–1859, 1860, 1861–1862, & 1863–1864)
Campaign

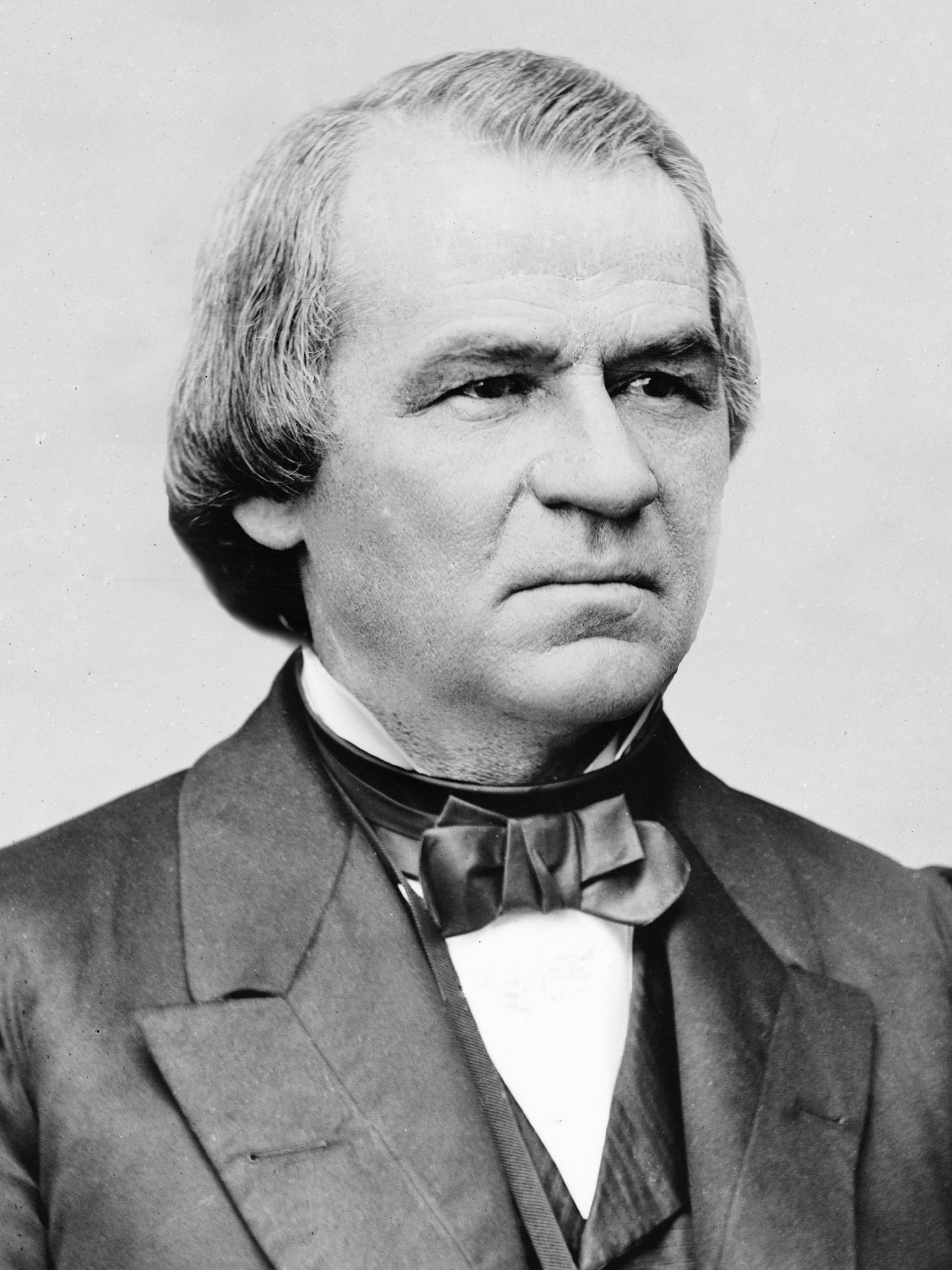
Andrew Johnson, the incumbent president in 1868, whose partial term expired on March 4, 1869

Democratic candidates:
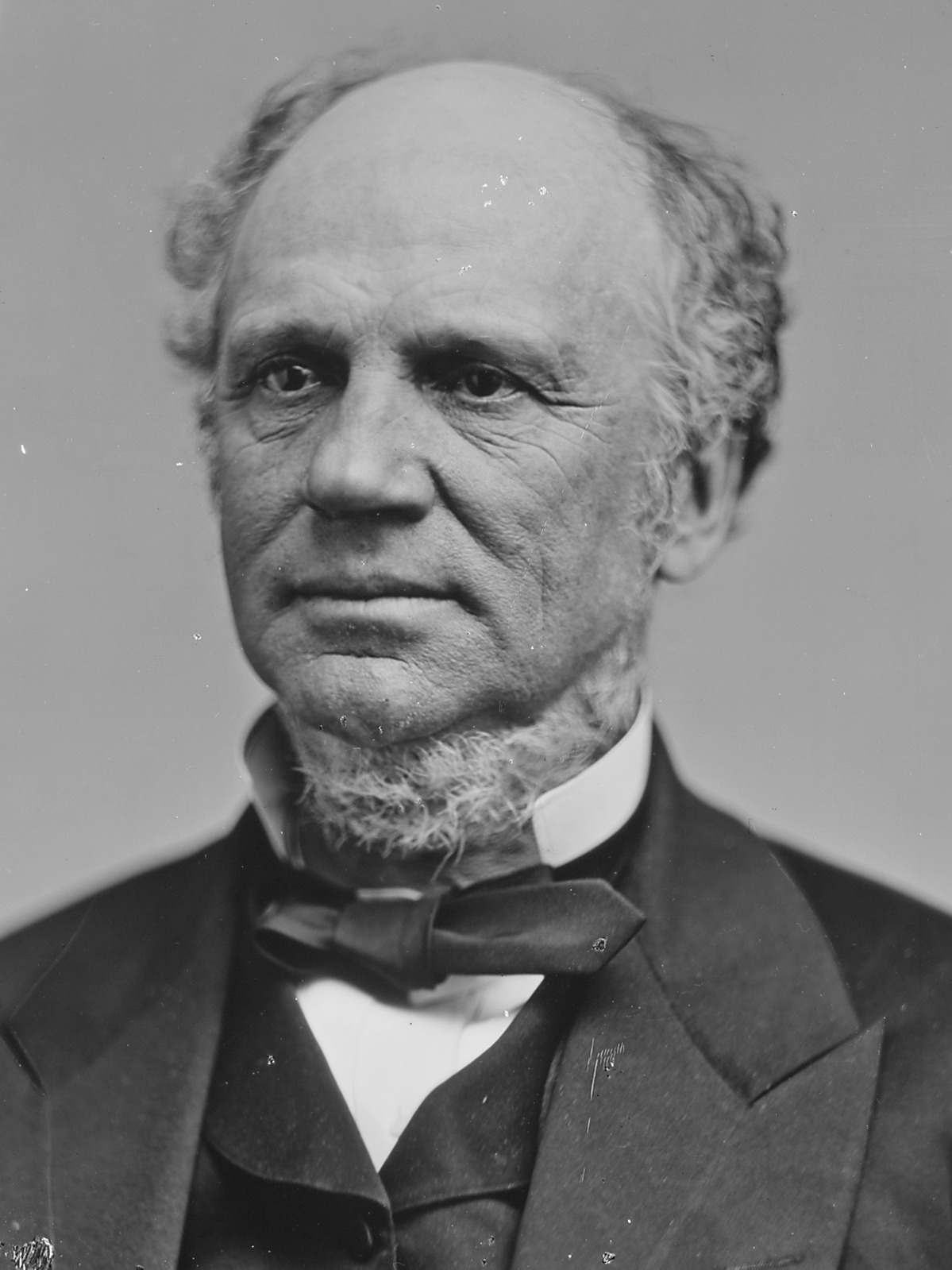
Former Governor Horatio Seymour of New York

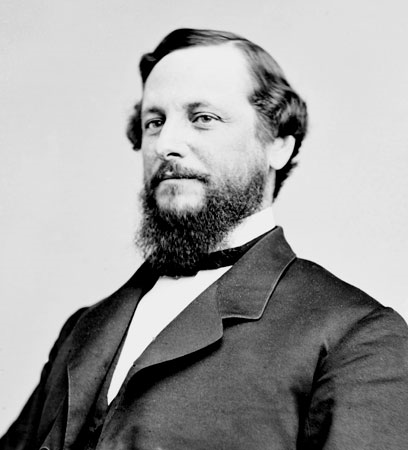
Former Representative George H. Pendleton of Ohio

Senator Thomas A. Hendricks of Indiana

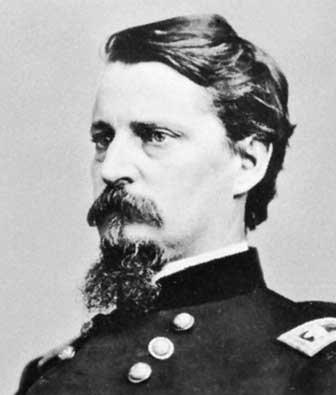
General Winfield Scott Hancock of Pennsylvania

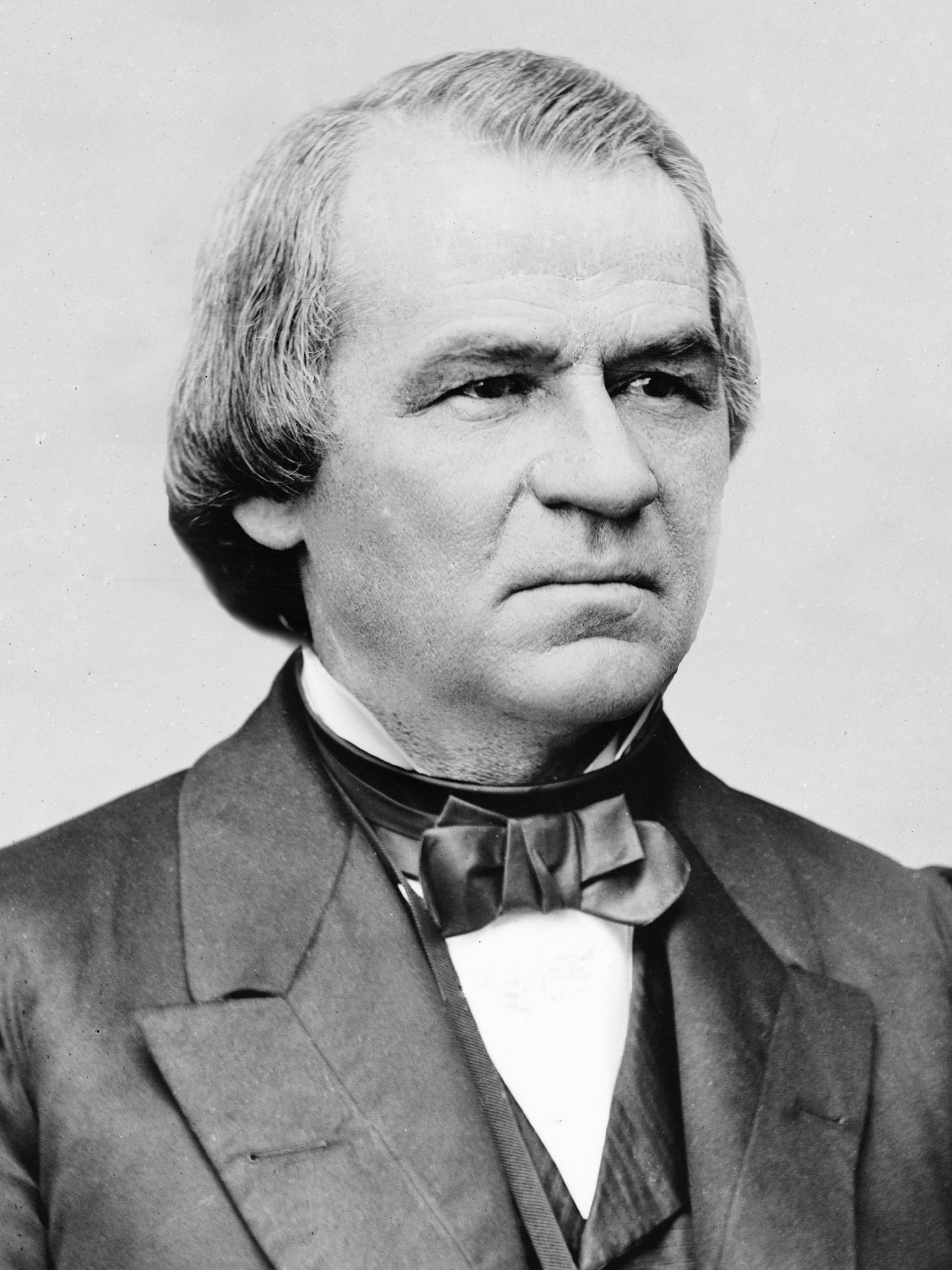
President Andrew Johnson of Tennessee

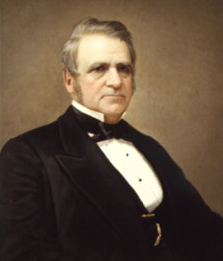
Former Lieutenant Governor Sanford E. Church of New York
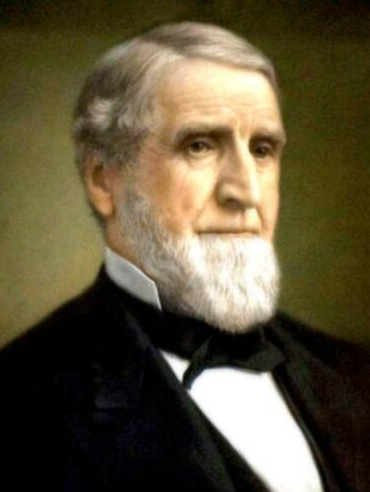
Former Representative Asa Packer of Pennsylvania

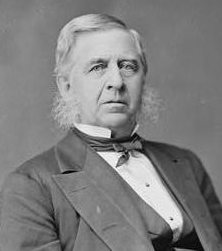
Governor James E. English of Connecticut

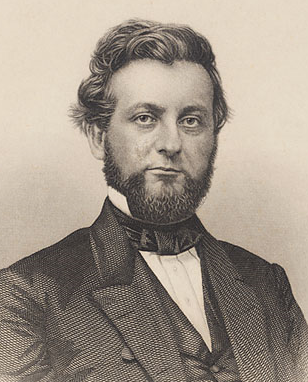
Former Governor Joel Parker of New Jersey

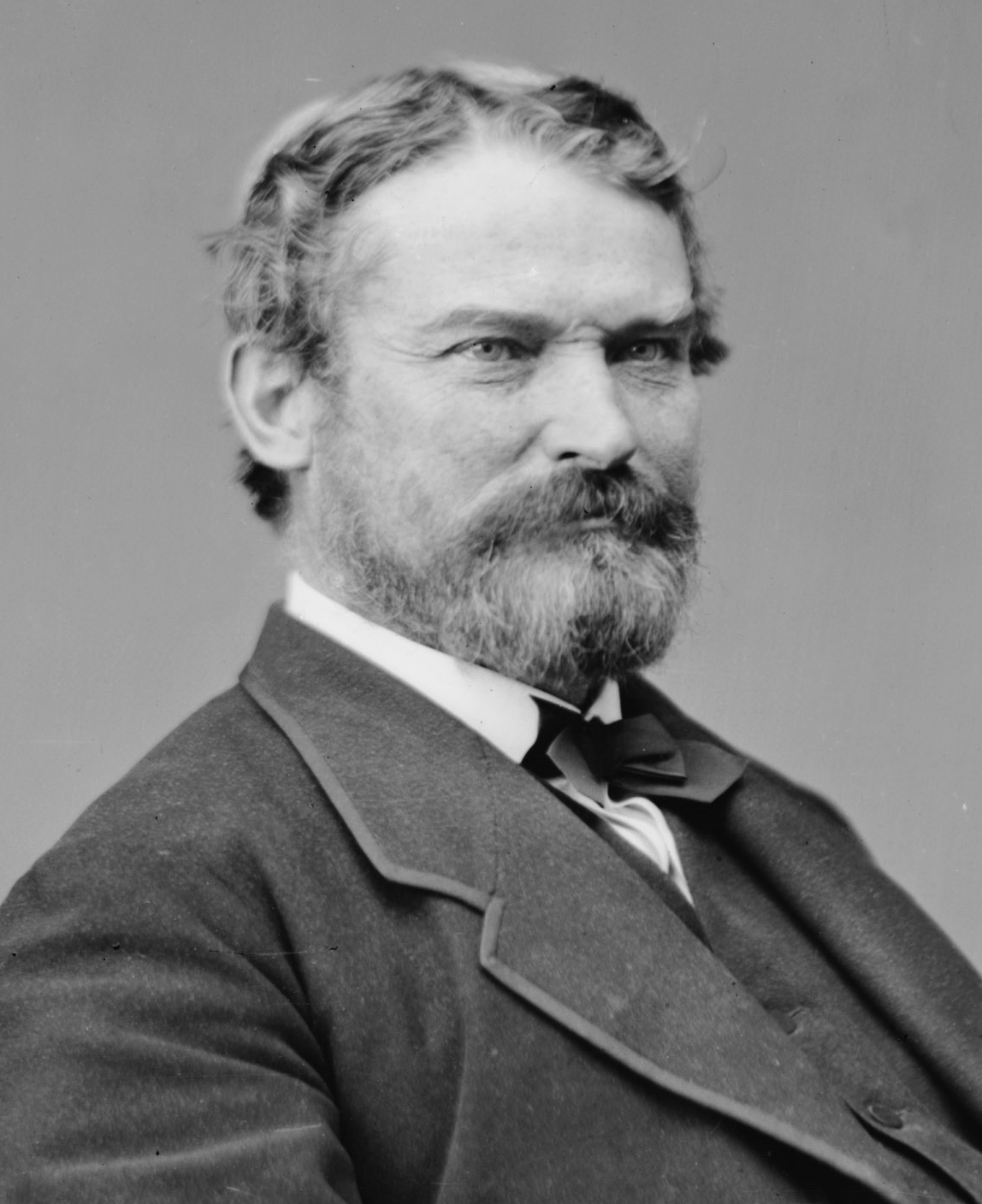
Senator James Rood Doolittle of Wisconsin

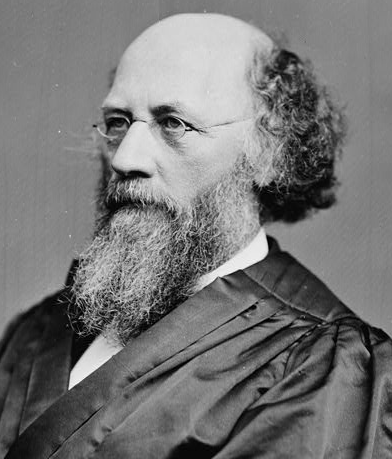
Associate Justice Stephen J. Field of California

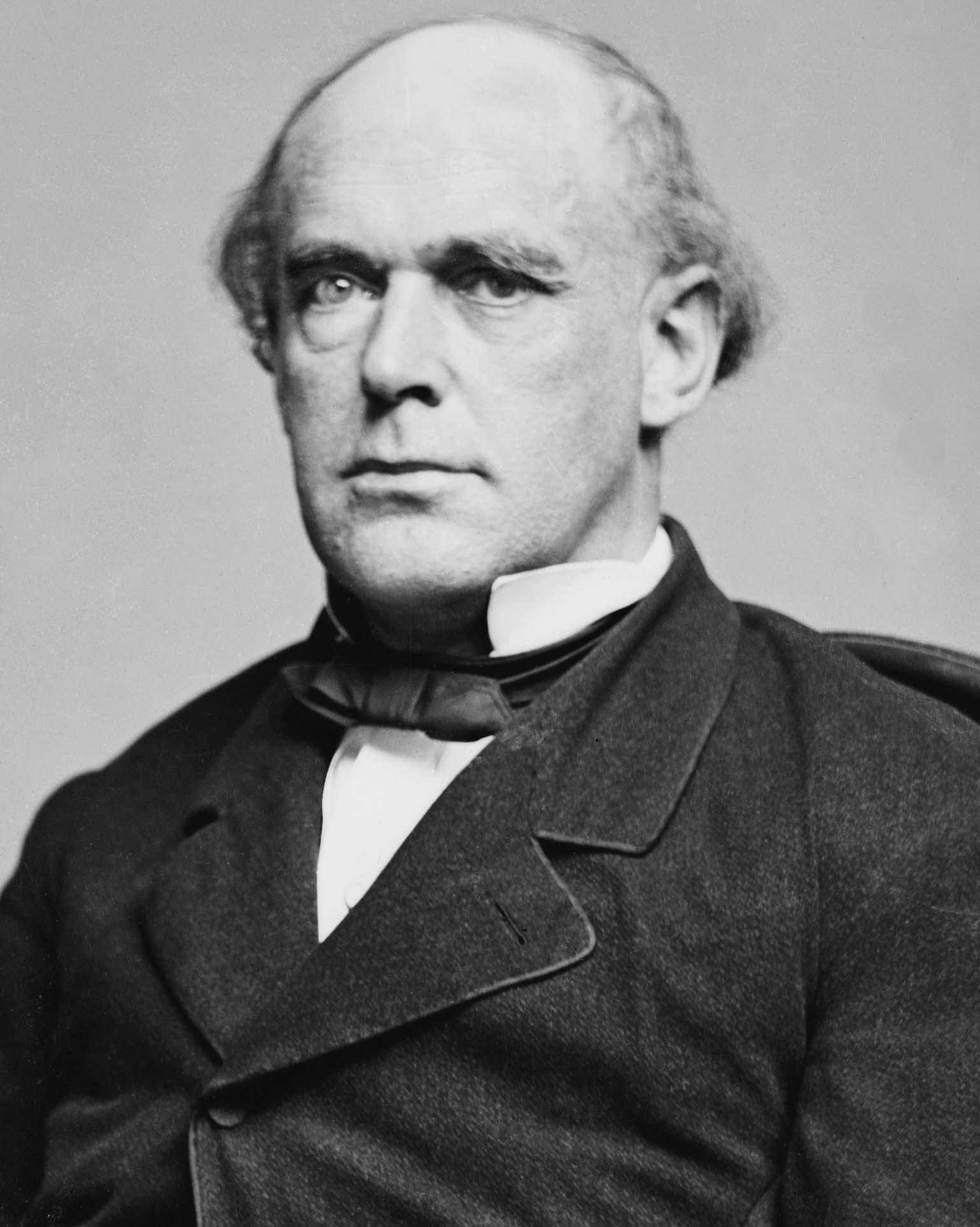
Chief Justice Salmon P. Chase of Ohio

The Democratic National Convention was held in New York City on July 4–9, 1868 and party leaders were badly divided with little else to agree on outside ending Reconstruction. Eastern Democrats called for war bonds to be redeemed in gold, although many of them had been purchased with badly depreciated greenbacks. Western Democrats on the other hand called for the "Ohio Idea"--redemption in greenbacks as indebted farmers considered that more money in circulation would make repayment of their debts easier. The Ohio Idea would become part of the Democratic Party platform, but would not be espoused by its candidate. The front-runner in the early balloting was George H. Pendleton (1864 Democratic vice presidential nominee), who led on the first 15 ballots, followed in varying order by President Johnson, Winfield Scott Hancock, Sanford Church, Asa Packer, Joel Parker, James E. English, James Rood Doolittle, and Thomas A. Hendricks. The unpopular Johnson, having narrowly survived impeachment, won 65 votes on the first ballot, less than one-third of the total necessary for nomination, and thus lost his bid for election as president in his own right.

Meanwhile, convention chairman Horatio Seymour, former governor of New York, received nine votes on the fourth ballot from the state of North Carolina. This unexpected move caused "loud and enthusiastic cheering," but Seymour refused, saying,

I must not be nominated by this Convention, as I could not accept the nomination if tendered. My own inclination prompted me to decline at the outset; my honor compels me to do so now. It is impossible, consistently with my position, to allow my name to be mentioned in this Convention against my protest. The clerk will proceed with the call.

By the seventh ballot Pendleton and Hendricks had emerged as the two front-runners, with Hancock the only other candidate with much support by this point. After numerous indecisive ballots, the names of John T. Hoffman, Francis P. Blair, and Stephen Johnson Field were placed in nomination, but none of these candidates gained substantial support.

For 21 ballots, the opposing candidates battled it out: the East battling the West for control, the conservatives battling the radicals. Pendleton's support collapsed after the 15th ballot, but went to Hancock rather than Hendricks, leaving the convention still deadlocked. The two leading candidates were determined that the other should not receive the presidential nomination; because of the two-thirds rule of the convention, a compromise candidate was needed. Seymour still hoped it would be Chief Justice Salmon P. Chase, but on the 22nd ballot, the chairman of the Ohio delegation announced, "at the unanimous request and demand of the delegation I place Horatio Seymour in nomination with 21 votes—against his inclination, but no longer against his honor."

Seymour had to wait for the rousing cheers to die down before he could address the delegates and decline.

I have no terms in which to tell of my regret that my name has been brought before this convention. God knows that my life and all that I value most in life I would give for the good of my country, which I believe to be identified with that of the Democratic party …

"Take the nomination, then!" cried someone from the floor.

... but when I said that I could not be a candidate, I mean it! I could not receive the nomination without placing not only myself but the Democratic party in a false position. God bless you for your kindness to me, but your candidate I cannot be.

Seymour left the platform to cool off and rest. No sooner had he left the hall than the Ohio chairman cried that his delegation would not accept Seymour's declination; Utah's chairman rose to say that Seymour was the man they had to have. While Seymour was waiting in the vestibule, the convention nominated him for president unanimously.

Exhausted, the delegates unanimously nominated General Francis Preston Blair Jr., for vice president on the first ballot after John A. McClernand, Augustus C. Dodge, and Thomas Ewing Jr., withdrew their names from consideration. Blair's nomination reflected a desire to balance the ticket east and west as well as north and south.

Blair had worked hard for the Democratic vice presidential nomination and accepted second place on the ticket, finding himself in controversy. He had gained attention for an inflammatory letter addressed to Colonel James O. Broadhead, dated a few days before the convention met, in which he wrote that the "real and only issue in this contest was the overthrow of Reconstruction, as the radical Republicans had forced it in the South."

== General election ==
=== Campaign ===
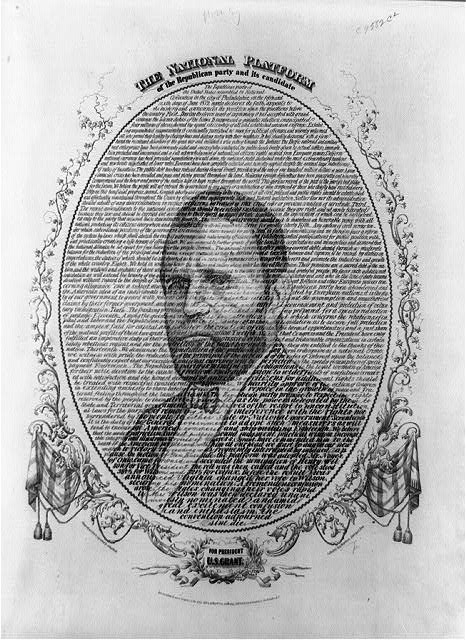
Republican campaign poster, created by superimposing a portrait of Grant onto the platform of the Republican Party

The 1868 campaign of Horatio Seymour versus Ulysses S. Grant was conducted vigorously, being fought out largely on the question of how Reconstruction should be conducted.

Seymour's campaign was marked by pronounced appeals to racism with repeated attempts to brand General Grant as the "Nigger" candidate and Seymour as the "White Man's" candidate. Denouncing the Republicans' Reconstruction policy as allegedly subjecting the South "to military despotism and negro supremacy," Democrats campaigned on the motto, "This is a white man's country; let white men rule."

Grant's General Order No. 11 during the Civil War became a campaign issue. He apologized in a letter for the controversial order, stating "I have no prejudice against sect or race, but want each individual to be judged by his own merit. Order No. 11 does not sustain this statement, I admit, but then I do not sustain that order. It would never have been issued if it had not been telegraphed the moment it was penned and without reflection." In his army days he had traded at a local store operated by the Seligman brothers, two Jewish merchants who became Grant's lifelong friends.

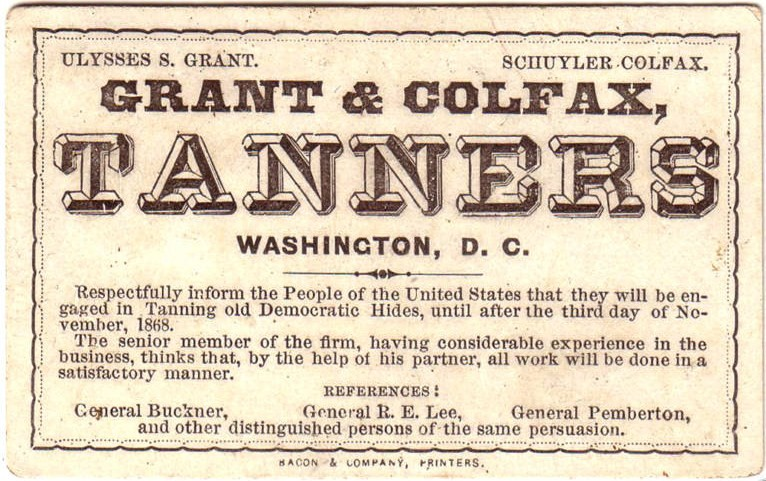
Grant/Colfax humorous campaign card

Grant took no part in the campaign and made no promises. The Republican campaign theme, "Let us have peace," was taken from his letter of acceptance. After four years of civil war, three years of wrangling over Reconstruction, and the attempted impeachment of a president, the nation craved the peace Grant pledged to achieve.

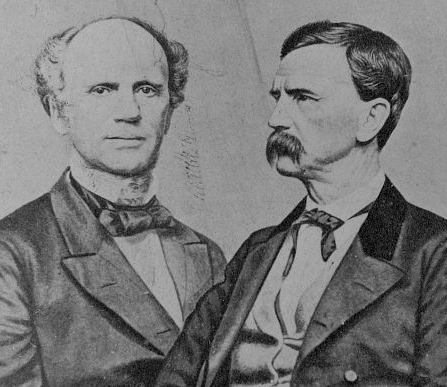
Seymour/Blair campaign photograph

Seymour answered none of the charges made against him, but made a few key speeches. Some newspapers exaggerated his faults. As governor, Seymour had sent troops to Gettysburg, but some press tried to portray him as disloyal to the Union. The New York Tribune led the cartoon campaign with the picture of Seymour standing on the steps of the City Hall calling a mob of New York draft rioters "my friends." The Hartford Post called him "almost as much of a corpse" as ex-President James Buchanan, who had just died. Additionally, Republicans alleged that insanity ran through the Seymour family, citing as evidence the suicide of his father.

Blair went on a national speaking tour in which he framed the contest with Ulysses S. Grant and the pro-Reconstruction Republicans in stark racial terms, warning of the rule of "a semi-barbarous race of blacks who are worshipers of fetishes and poligamists" and wanted to "subject the white women to their unbridled lust." Republicans advised Americans not to vote for Seymour, as Blair might succeed him.

Northern and Southern Democratic Sheet Music
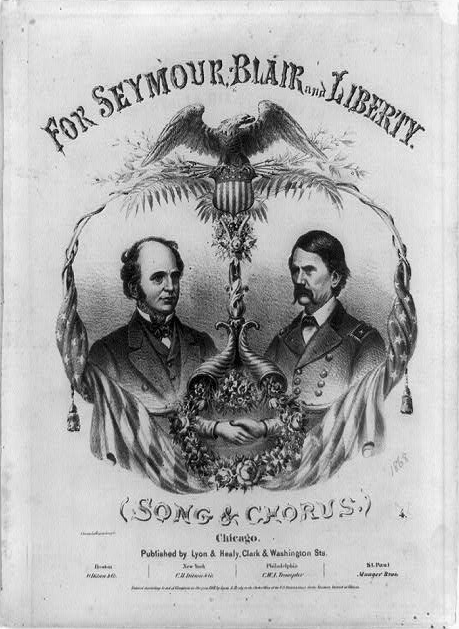

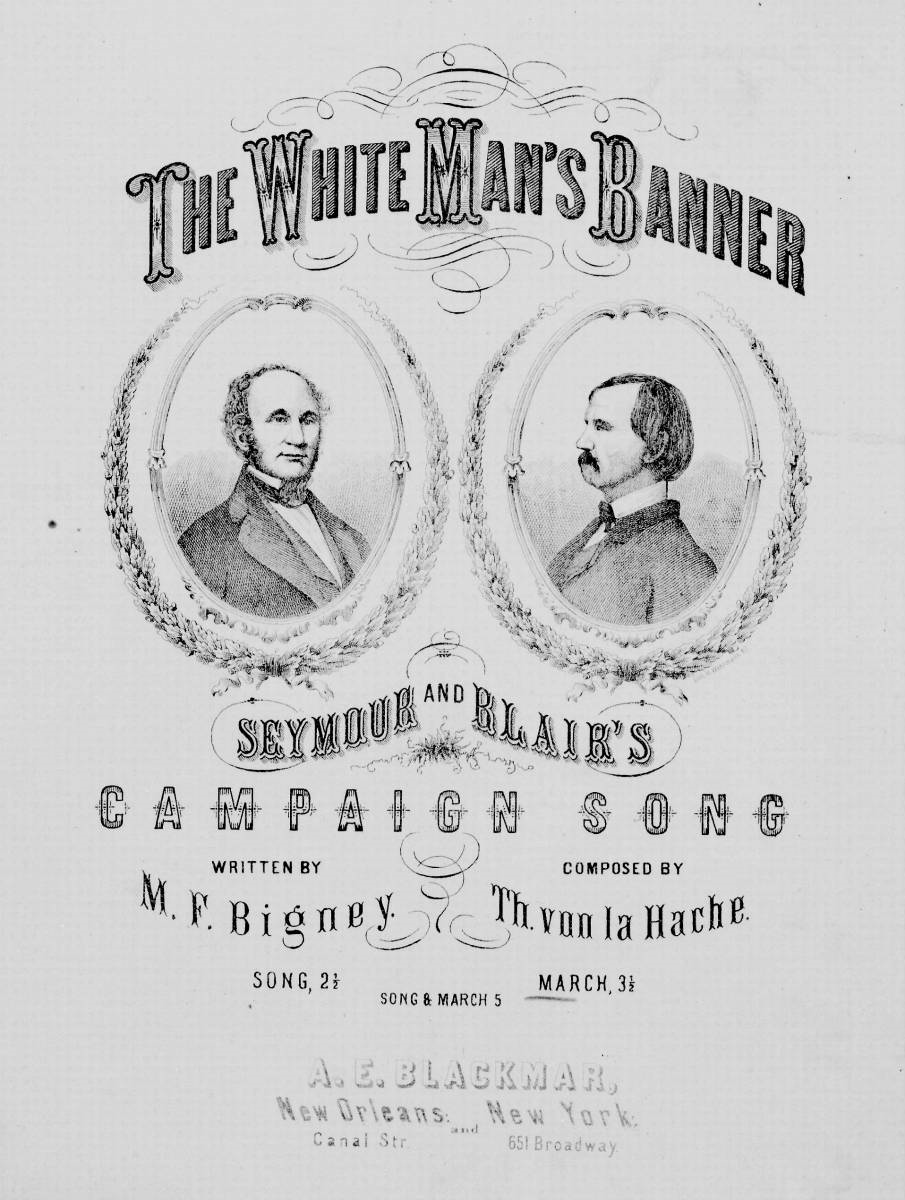

Blair had a reputation for outspokenness and his campaign speeches in 1868 attacked Radical Republicans. Samuel J. Tilden, a member of the national committee, asked Blair to confine his campaigning to Missouri and Illinois for fear he "would hurt the ticket" because of his stance on Reconstruction.

Seymour, who had not taken an active role in the campaign to this point, went into the canvass, seeking to steer the campaign away from the harshness of Blair's attacks on Radical Reconstruction. Seymour emphasized his idea that change in the South should be accomplished at the state level, without national interference. The Democrats campaigned for immediate restoration of all states, the "regulation of the elective franchise in the states by their citizens", and amnesty for past political offenses, while State civil authority should take precedence over military action. The president and the Supreme Court should be respected rather than attacked, as he claimed the Republicans had done. The Democrats would be careful to reorder national priorities.

As an Eastern "gold" Democrat, Seymour also rejected the Ohio Idea and thus lost the support of the party's Western contingent, which contributed to his ultimate defeat at the ballot box.

=== Results ===
1868 Election Victory Address

"The responsibilities of the position I feel, but accept them without fear, if I can have the same support which has been given to me thus far. I thank you and all others who have fought together in this contest—a contest in which you are all interested personally as much, and perhaps more than I am.

I now take occasion to bid you good bye, as I leave here tomorrow for Washington, and shall probably see but few of you again for some years to come; although it would give me great pleasure to make an annual pilgrimage to a place where I have enjoyed myself so much as I have here during the past few months."

— Ulysses S. Grant, speech to the citizens of Galena, Illinois (November 5, 1868)

31.7% of the voting age population and 80.9% of eligible voters participated in the election. Horatio Seymour polled 2,708,744 votes and Grant 3,013,650.

The closeness of the popular vote surprised the political elite at the time. Republican Representative James G. Blaine called the slender popular majority for Grant "a very startling fact." Normally an acute judge of popular sentiment, Blaine was at a loss to explain the size of the Democratic vote. Ethnic Irish Catholic and other immigrants had been settling in New York City for nearly a quarter century. The narrow margins by which Seymour lost several of the northern states like Indiana, Connecticut, and Pennsylvania, and the effects of new black votes in the South provoked the suspicion that a majority of white men voted for Seymour.

Grant won every southern state except Georgia and Louisiana, where fraud and violence by the Ku Klux Klan and Knights of the White Camelia were so severe that it delivered Democratic majorities. Klan violence also led to a steep drop in Republican votes in areas of Tennessee, Alabama, and South Carolina.

Along the border, Kentucky, Maryland, and Delaware went overwhelmingly Democratic. In Kentucky, the result was influenced by hostility toward the Radical Reconstructionists, which had led to the state's first postwar government being almost entirely composed of former Confederates. No Democratic presidential candidate before or since has attained a higher percentage of the vote in Kentucky or Maryland, where hostility toward black suffrage was very widespread. As for Delaware, only the Democratic tickets of Johnson/Humphrey in 1964 (which received the largest percentage of the popular vote since 1824) and Obama/Biden in 2008 (with the first Delawarean on a national ticket) carried the state with a larger percentage of the vote.

Two border states, Missouri and West Virginia, both under Republican control, gave their electoral votes to Grant. Seymour narrowly carried his home state of New York, but Blair, largely because of the Radicals' registry system, failed to carry Missouri. The Missouri Democrat exulted: "General Blair is beaten in his ward, his city, his county and his State." In West Virginia, former Confederates were temporarily forbidden from voting or holding public office. About 15,000 to 25,000 white residents were disfranchised as a result.

Of the 1,708 counties making returns, Grant won 991 (58.02%) and Seymour 713 (41.74%). Four counties (0.23%) split evenly between Grant and Seymour. Hence the Democrats, even with all the burdens of the war, still carried only 278 fewer counties than the Republicans. That cemented a solid party comeback at the grassroots level that had begun in local elections in 1867. 7% of counties in northern states voted for a different party from the 1864 election.

The 1868 election is the only election since the Civil War in which the two major party candidates won over 99.9% of the vote. Out of a total of over 5.7 million votes, just 46 ballots were cast for anyone other than Grant and Seymour.

That was the last election in which the Republicans won Tennessee until 1920, the last in which the Democrats won Oregon until 1912, and the last in which the Republicans won Missouri until 1904.

That Grant lost New York to Seymour by 10,000 votes was a source of shame and anger to Republicans. Seymour's victory in New York was made the subject of a federal investigation. On November 4, Horace Greeley spoke at the Union League Club. The ULC promptly petitioned Congress to look into the state vote. The petition was presented to the House of Representatives on December 14 and accepted by a vote of 134–35 (52 abstained). Speaker of the House Schuyler Colfax, the Republican candidate for vice president, appointed a committee of seven: five Republicans and two Democrats. The committee was most likely created because the Republicans could not lose New York without a protest. It reported to the House of Representatives on February 23, 1869. The committee decided to take no action, and Seymour retained New York's 33 electoral votes. He was willing to return to the subject as long as he lived.

According to Seymour's biographer, Stewart Mitchell, the Republican Party claimed credit for saving the Union and was bound, bent, and determined to continue to rule it. The margin of Grant's popular majority resulted largely from winning a high percentage of the half-million newly enfranchised men of color. This strategy contrasted strongly with later years, when Republicans could not stop black disfranchisement in the former Confederate states, since they had many new and secure votes in new states in the Western United States.

Popular vote
Grant	52.66%
Seymour	47.34%
Others	0.00%

Electoral vote
Grant	72.79%
Seymour	27.21%

Electoral results
Presidential candidate	Party	Home state	Popular vote^{(a)}		Electoral vote^{(a)}	Running mate		
Presidential candidate	Party	Home state	Count	Percentage	Electoral vote^{(a)}	Vice-presidential candidate	Home state	Electoral vote^{(a)}
Ulysses S. Grant	Republican	Illinois	3,013,650	52.66%	214	Schuyler Colfax	Indiana	214
Horatio Seymour	Democratic	New York	2,708,744	47.34%	80	Francis Preston Blair Jr.	Missouri	80
Other			46	<0.01%	—	Other		—
Total			5,722,440	100%	294			294
Needed to win					148			148

Source (Popular Vote): Leip, David. "1868 Presidential Election Results". Dave Leip's Atlas of U.S. Presidential Elections. Source (Electoral Vote): "Electoral College Box Scores 1789–1996". National Archives and Records Administration. ^{(a)} Mississippi, Texas, and Virginia did not participate in the election of 1868 due to Reconstruction. In Florida, the state legislature cast its electoral vote for Grant by a vote of 40 to 9.

=== Geography of results ===
Results by county, shaded according to winning candidate's percentage of the vote

==== Cartographic gallery ====
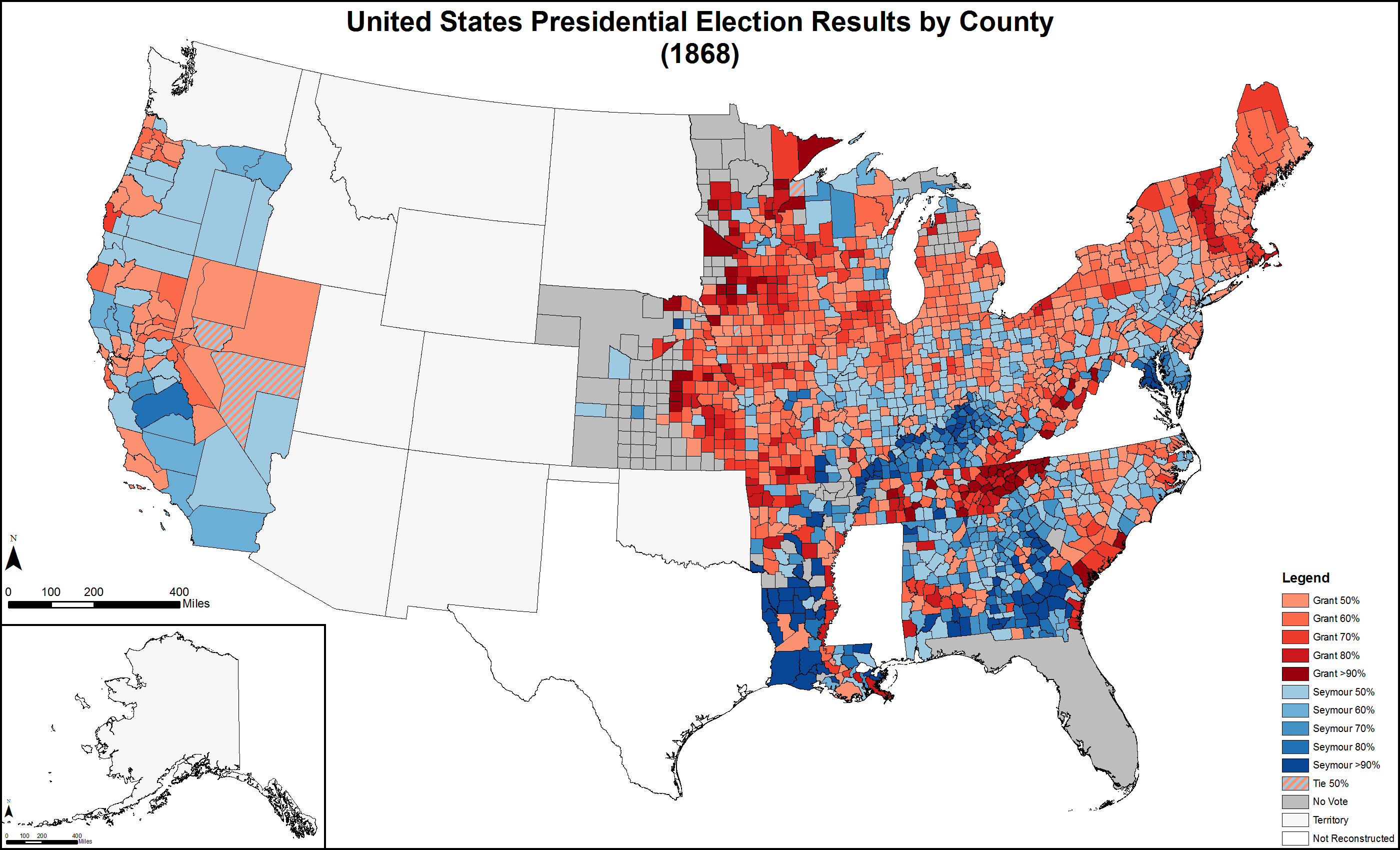
Map of presidential election results by county

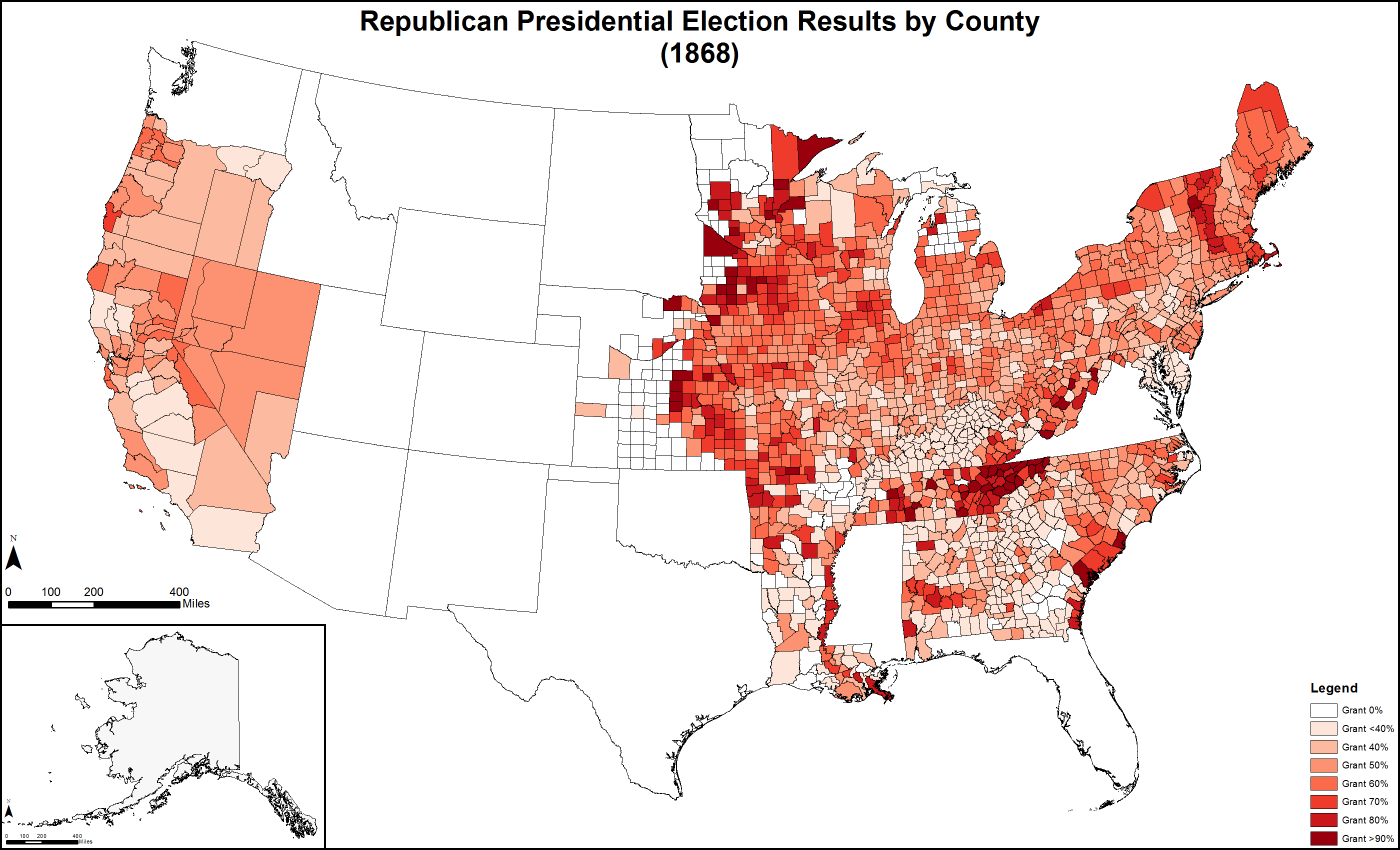
Map of Republican presidential election results by county

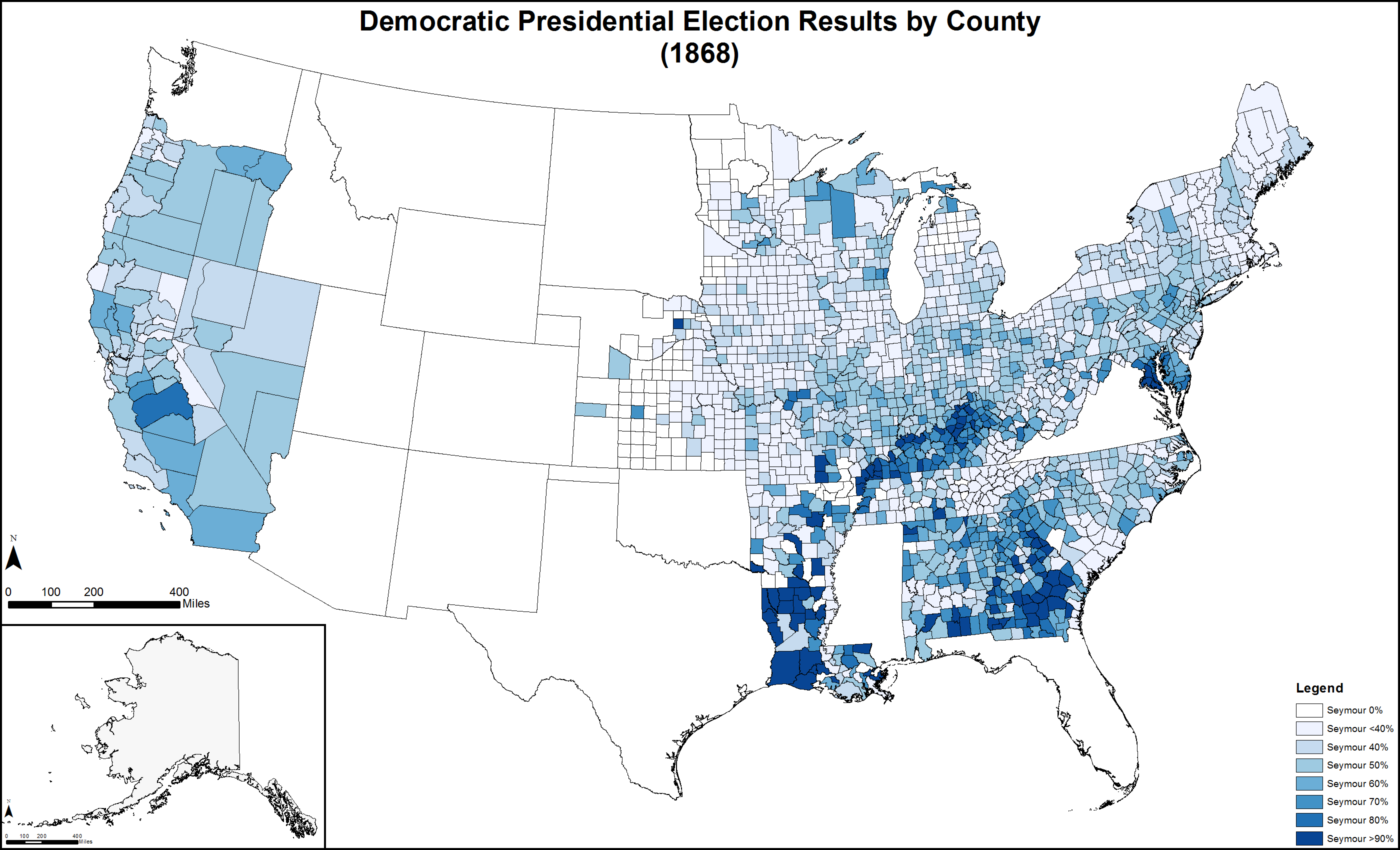
Map of Democratic presidential election results by county

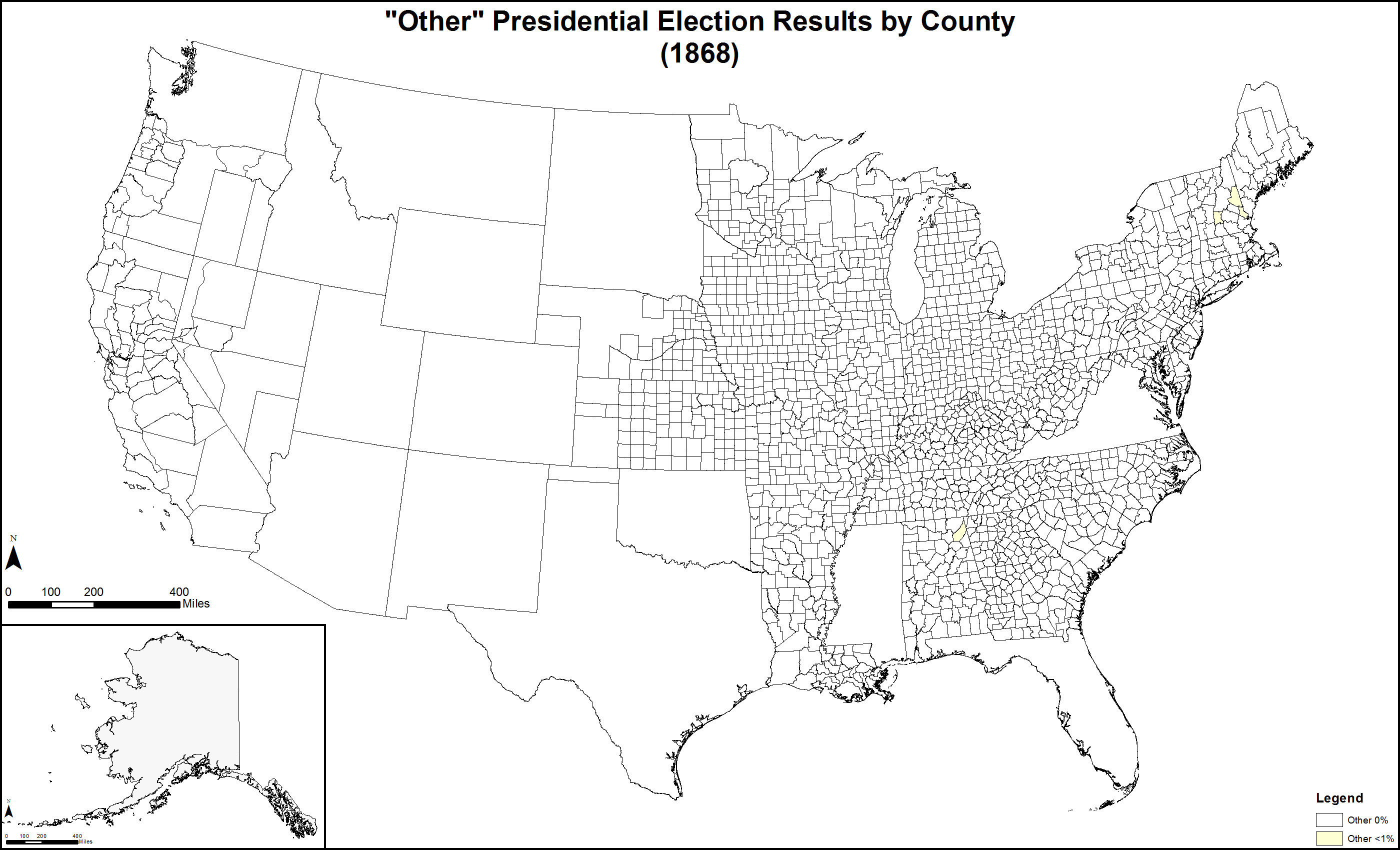
Map of "other" presidential election results by county

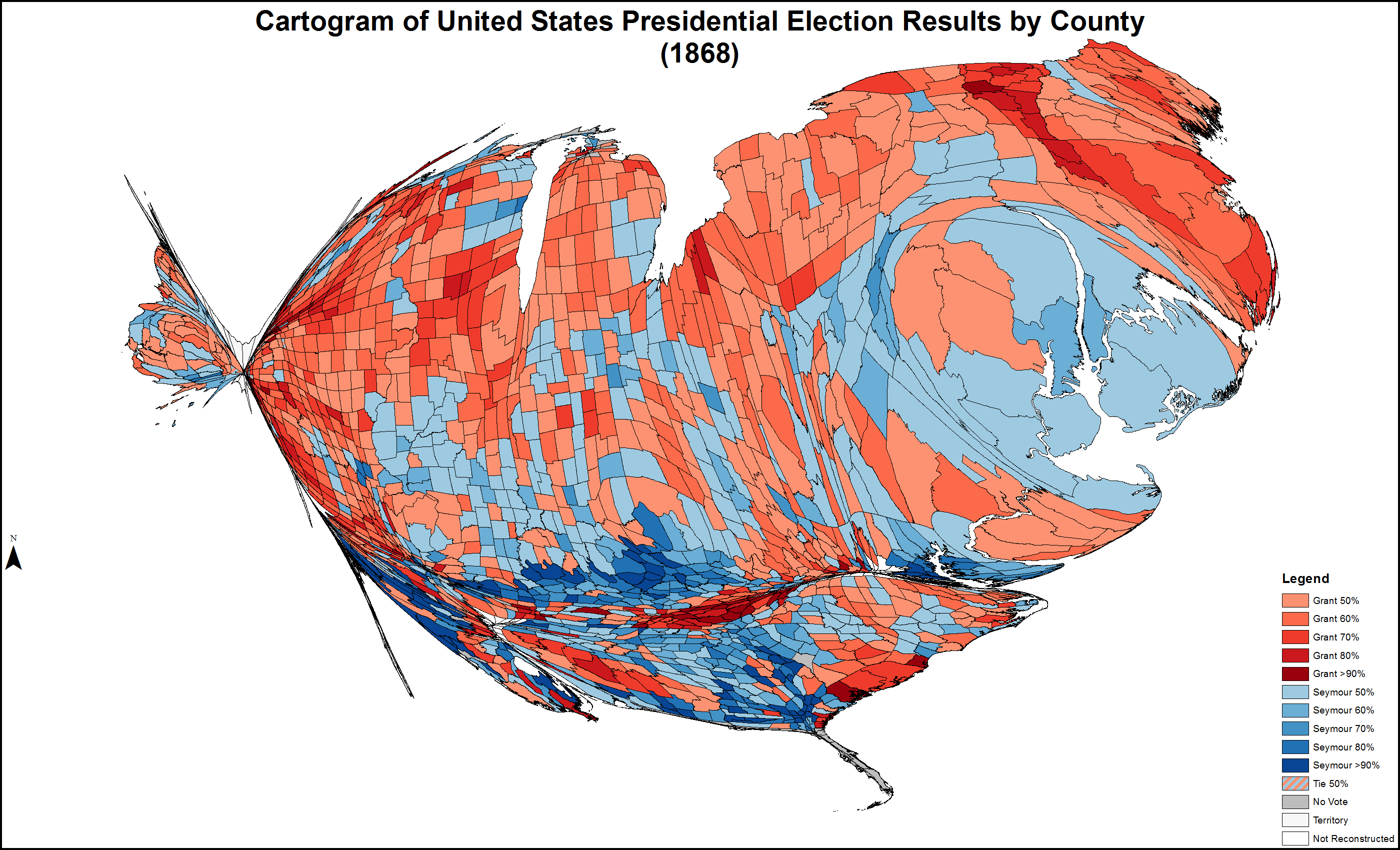
Cartogram of presidential election results by county

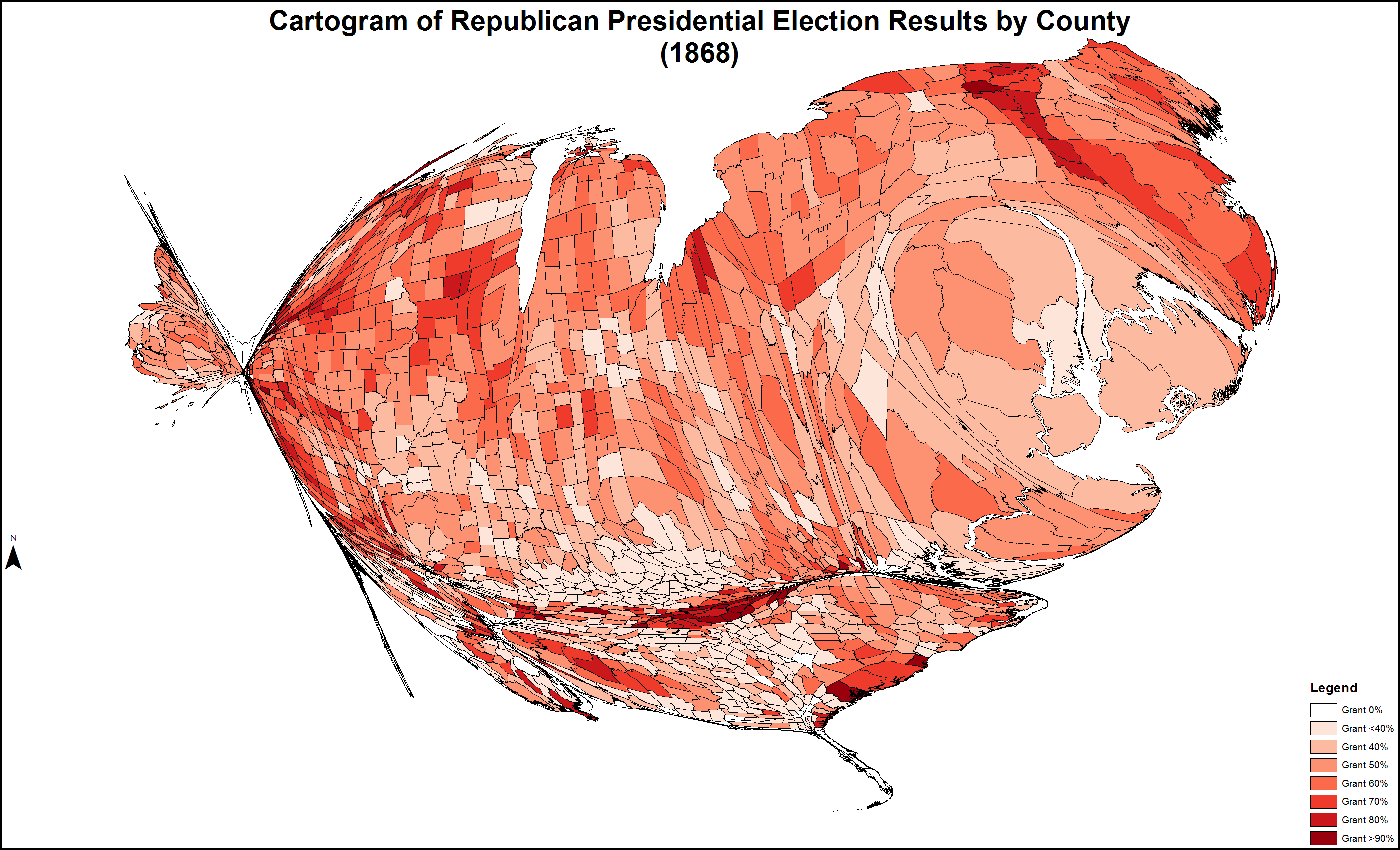
Cartogram of Republican presidential election results by county

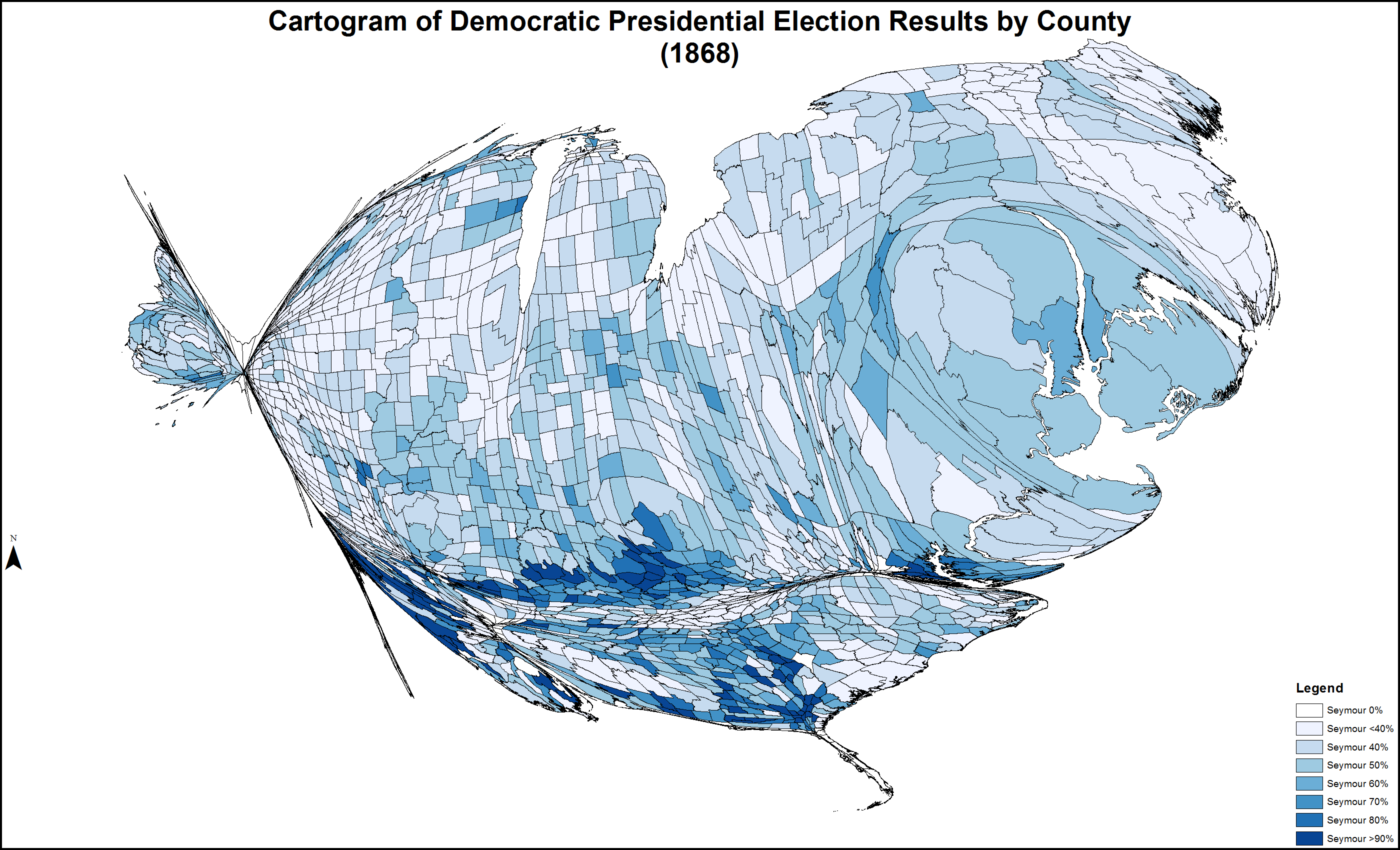
Cartogram of Democratic presidential election results by county

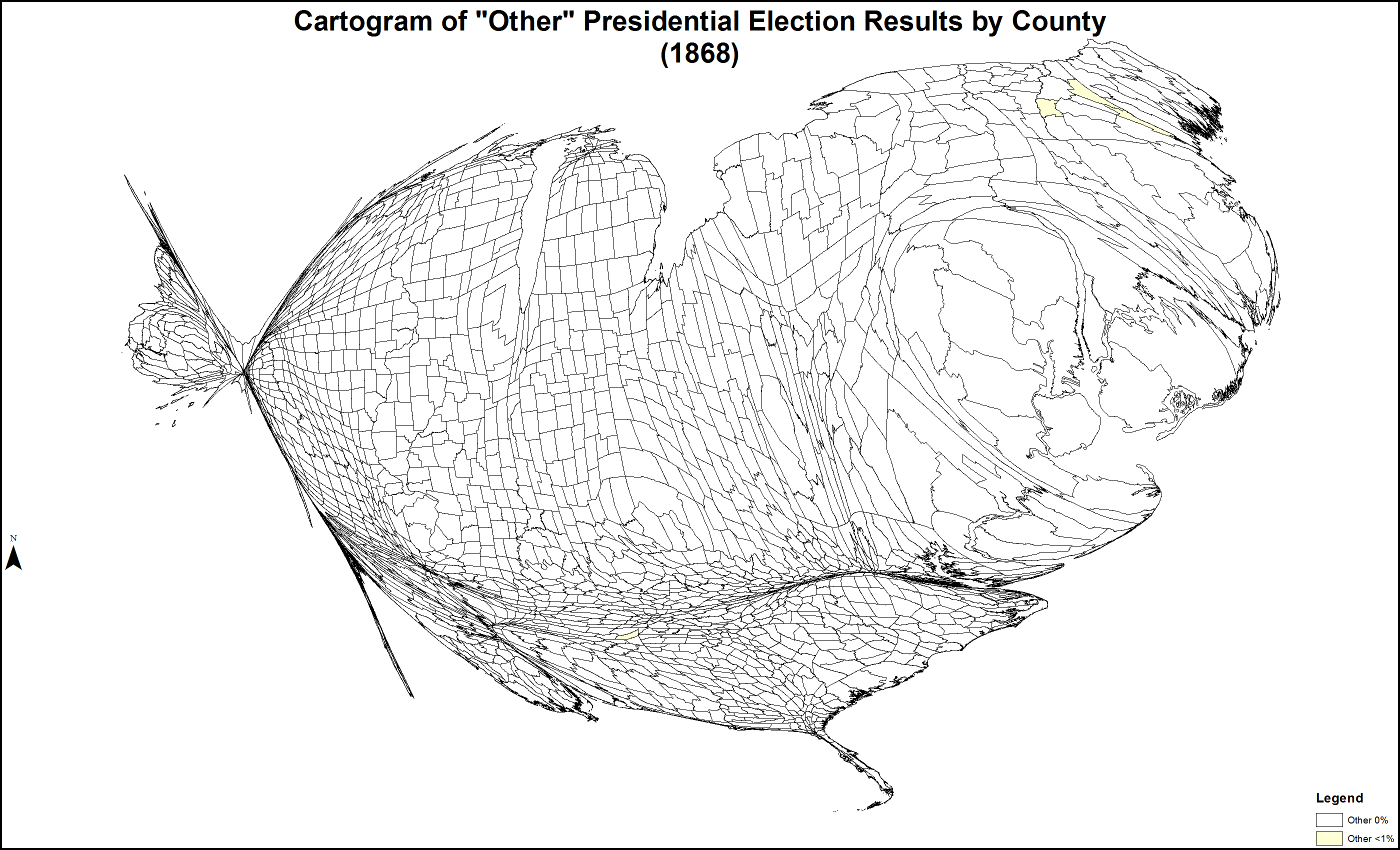
Cartogram of "other" presidential election results by county

=== Results by state ===
Source: Data from Walter Dean Burnham, Presidential ballots, 1836–1892 (Johns Hopkins University Press, 1955) pp 247–57.

States/districts won by Seymour/Blair
States/districts won by Grant/Colfax

		Ulysses S. Grant Republican			Horatio Seymour Democratic			Margin		State Total	
State	electoral votes	#	%	electoral votes	#	%	electoral votes	#	%	#	
Alabama	8	76,667	51.25	8	72,921	48.75	–	3,746	2.50	149,594	AL
Arkansas	5	22,112	53.68	5	19,078	46.32	–	3,034	7.36	41,190	AR
California	5	54,592	50.24	5	54,078	49.76	–	514	0.47	108,670	CA
Connecticut	6	50,788	51.49	6	47,844	48.51	–	2,944	2.98	98,632	CT
Delaware	3	7,614	41.00	–	10,957	59.00	3	−3,343	−18.00	18,571	DE
Florida	3	–	–	3 (Note: Due to the status of Reconstruction, no election was held; the three electoral votes were allocated by the Florida State Legislature to Grant.)	–	–	–	–	–	–	FL
Georgia	9	57,109	35.73	–	102,707	64.27	9	−45,598	−28.54	159,816	GA
Illinois	16	250,304	55.69	16	199,116	44.31	–	51,188	11.38	449,420	IL
Indiana	13	176,552	51.39	13	166,980	48.61	–	9,572	2.78	343,532	IN
Iowa	8	120,399	61.92	8	74,040	38.08	–	46,359	23.84	194,439	IA
Kansas	3	30,027	68.82	3	13,600	31.17	–	16,427	37.65	43,630	KS
Kentucky	11	39,566	25.45	–	115,889	74.55	11	−76,323	−49.10	155,455	KY
Louisiana	7	33,263	29.31	–	80,225	70.69	7	−46,962	−41.38	113,488	LA
Maine	7	70,502	62.41	7	42,460	37.59	–	28,042	24.82	112,962	ME
Maryland	7	30,438	32.80	–	62,357	67.20	7	−31,919	−34.40	92,795	MD
Massachusetts	12	136,379	69.76	12	59,103	30.23	–	77,276	39.53	195,508	MA
Michigan	8	128,560	56.98	8	97,060	43.02	–	31,500	13.96	225,620	MI
Minnesota	4	43,722	60.88	4	28,096	39.12	–	15,626	21.76	71,818	MN
Missouri	11	86,860	56.96	11	65,628	43.04	–	21,232	13.92	152,488	MO
Nebraska	3	9,772	63.91	3	5,519	36.09	–	4,253	27.82	15,291	NE
Nevada	3	6,480	55.39	3	5,218	44.61	–	1,262	10.78	11,698	NV
New Hampshire	5	37,718	55.22	5	30,575	44.76	–	7,143	10.46	68,304	NH
New Jersey	7	80,131	49.12	–	83,001	50.88	7	−2,870	−1.76	163,132	NJ
New York	33	419,888	49.41	–	429,883	50.59	33	−9,995	−1.18	849,771	NY
North Carolina	9	96,939	53.41	9	84,559	46.59	–	12,380	6.82	181,498	NC
Ohio	21	280,167	54.00	21	238,621	46.00	–	41,546	8.00	518,788	OH
Oregon	3	10,961	49.63	–	11,125	50.37	3	−164	−0.74	22,086	OR
Pennsylvania	26	342,280	52.20	26	313,382	47.80	–	28,898	4.40	655,662	PA
Rhode Island	4	12,993	66.49	4	6,548	33.51	–	6,445	32.98	19,541	RI
South Carolina	6	62,301	57.93	6	45,237	42.07	–	17,064	15.86	107,538	SC
Tennessee	10	56,628	68.43	10	26,129	31.57	–	30,499	36.86	82,757	TN
Vermont	5	44,167	78.57	5	12,045	21.43	–	32,122	57.14	56,212	VT
West Virginia	5	29,015	58.83	5	20,306	41.17	–	8,709	17.66	49,321	WV
Wisconsin	8	108,900	56.25	8	84,703	43.75	–	24,197	12.50	193,603	WI
TOTALS:	294	3,013,790	52.66	214	2,708,980	47.34	80	304,810	5.32	5,722,440	US

=== States that flipped from Republican to Democratic ===
- Louisiana
- Maryland
- New York
- Oregon

=== Close states ===
Red font color denotes states won by Republican Ulysses S. Grant; blue denotes those won by Democrat Horatio Seymour.

States where the margin of victory was under 1% (8 electoral votes)

1. California 0.48% (520 votes)
2. Oregon 0.74% (164 votes)

States where the margin of victory was under 5% (93 electoral votes)

1. New York 1.18% (9,995 votes)
2. New Jersey 1.76% (2,870 votes)
3. Alabama 2.50% (3,746 votes)
4. Indiana 2.79% (9,572 votes)
5. Connecticut 2.98% (2,944 votes)
6. Pennsylvania 4.41% (28,898 votes)

States where the margin of victory was under 10% (35 electoral votes)

1. North Carolina 6.82% (12,380 votes) (tipping point state for a Grant victory)
2. Arkansas 7.37% (3,034 votes) (tipping point state for a Seymour victory)
3. Ohio 8.01% (41,546 votes)

==== Statistics ====
Counties with highest percent of vote (Republican)

1. Hancock County, Tennessee 100.00%
2. Monona County, Iowa 100.00%
3. Ottawa County, Kansas 100.00%
4. Jefferson County, Nebraska 100.00%
5. McDowell County, West Virginia 100.00%

Counties with highest percent of vote (Democratic)

1. St. Landry Parish, Louisiana 100.00%
2. Lafayette Parish, Louisiana 100.00%
3. Jackson Parish, Louisiana 100.00%
4. De Soto Parish, Louisiana 100.00%
5. Franklin Parish, Louisiana 100.00%

Counties with highest percent of vote (Other)

1. DeKalb County, Alabama 0.70%
2. Sullivan County, New Hampshire 0.11%
3. Strafford County, New Hampshire 0.09%
4. Carroll County, New Hampshire 0.02%

== See also ==
- American election campaigns in the 19th century
- First inauguration of Ulysses S. Grant
- History of the United States (1865–1918)
- History of the United States Democratic Party
- History of the United States Republican Party
- Reconstruction era
- Third Party System
- 1868–1869 United States House of Representatives elections
- 1868–1869 United States Senate elections
- Ohio idea

== Bibliography ==
- Abbott, Richard (1986). The Republican Party and the South, 1855–1877: The First Southern Strategy. University of North Carolina Press. ISBN 0807816809.
- Abramson, Paul; Aldrich, John; Rohde, David (1995). Change and Continuity in the 1992 Elections. CQ Press. ISBN 0871878399.
- American Annual Cyclopedia ... 1868 (1869), online, highly detailed compendium of facts and primary sources
- Coleman, Charles Hubert. The election of 1868 : the Democratic effort to regain control (1933) online
- Gambill, Edward. Conservative Ordeal: Northern Democrats and Reconstruction, 1865–1868. (Iowa State University Press: 1981).
- Henry, Robert Selph. The Story of Reconstruction (1938)
- Prymak, Andrew. "The 1868 and 1872 Elections," in Edward O. Frantz, ed. A Companion to the Reconstruction Presidents 1865–1881 (Wiley Blackwell Companions to American History) (2014) pp 235–56 online
- Rhodes, James G. History of the United States from the Compromise of 1850 to the McKinley-Bryan Campaign of 1896. Volume: 6. (1920). 1865–72; detailed narrative history
- Simpson, Brooks D. Let Us Have Peace: Ulysses S. Grant and the Politics of War and Reconstruction, 1861–1868 (1991).
- Summers, Mark Wahlgren.The Press Gang: Newspapers and Politics, 1865–1878 (1994)
- Summers, Mark Wahlgren. The Era of Good Stealings (1993), covers corruption 1868–1877

=== Primary sources ===
- Chester, Edward W A guide to political platforms (1977) pp 86–89 online
- Official proceedings of the National Democratic convention, held at New York, July 4–9, 1868
- Edward McPherson. The Political History of the United States of America During the Period of Reconstruction (1875) large collection of speeches and primary documents, 1865–1870, complete text online.[The copyright has expired.]
- Porter, Kirk H. and Donald Bruce Johnson, eds. National party platforms, 1840–1964 (1965) online 1840–1956
