= 1868 United States presidential election in Tennessee =

- November 3, 1868
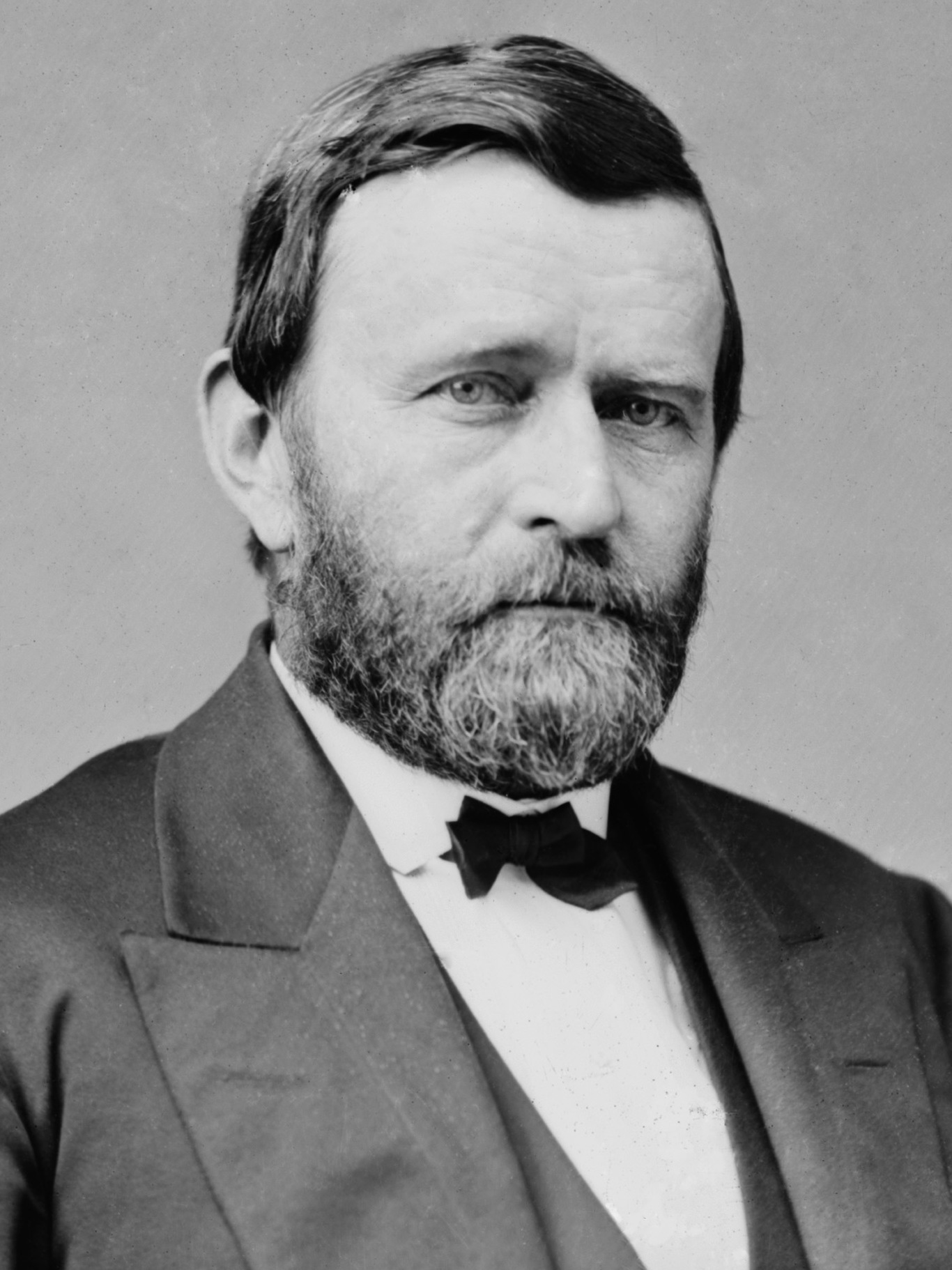

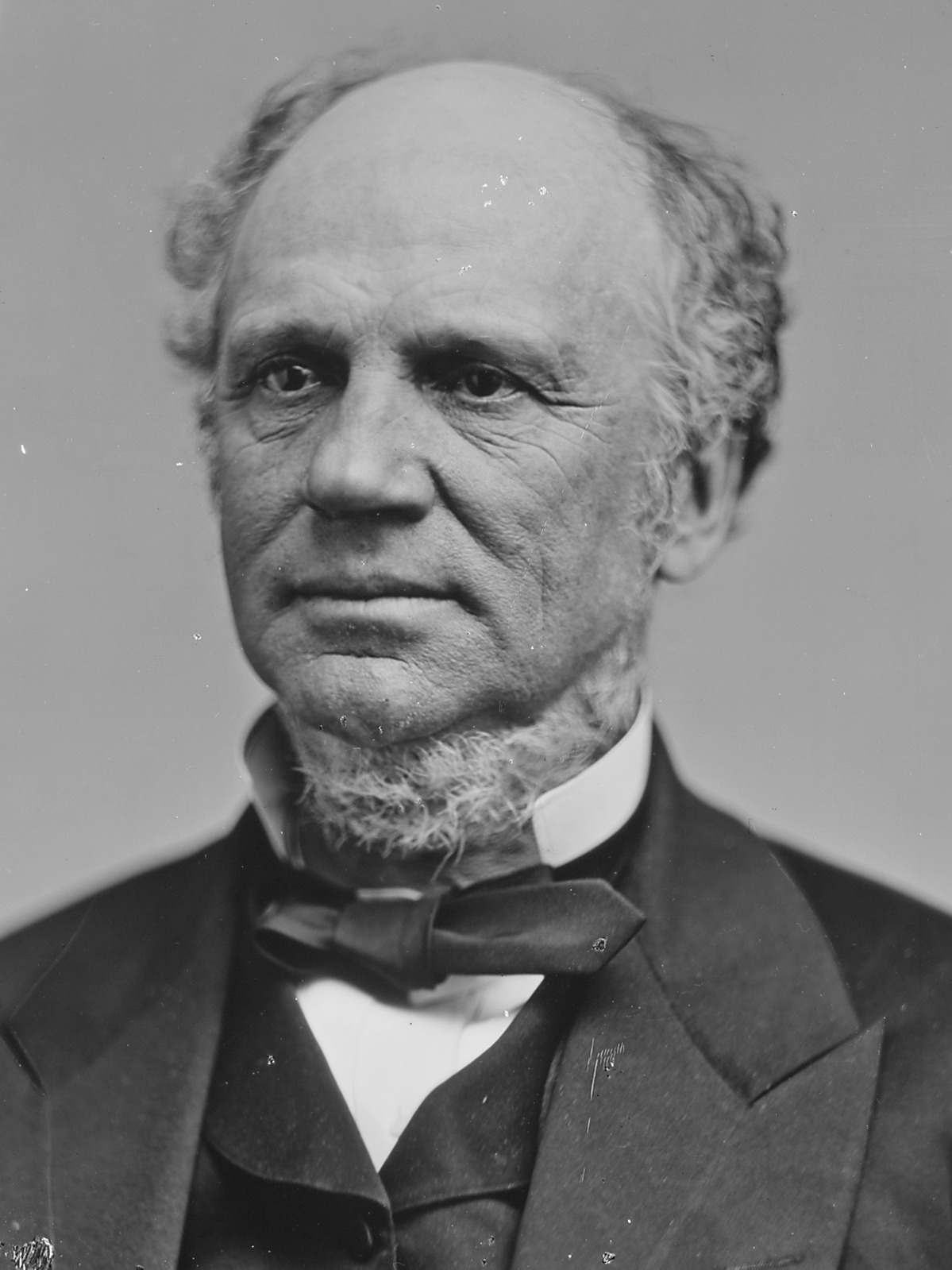
Nominee	Ulysses S. Grant	Horatio Seymour
Party	Republican	Democratic
Home state	Illinois	New York
Running mate	Schuyler Colfax	Francis Preston Blair Jr.
Electoral vote	10	0
Popular vote	56,628	26,129
Percentage	68.43%	31.57%
County results
Grant
50–60%
60–70%
70–80%
80–90%
90–100%
Seymour
50–60%
60–70%
70–80%
80–90%
90–100%
Unknown/No vote
President before election
Andrew Johnson
Democratic
Elected President
Ulysses S. Grant
Republican

The 1868 United States presidential election in Tennessee took place on November 3, 1868, as part of the 1868 United States presidential election. State voters chose 10 representatives, or electors, to the Electoral College, who voted for president and vice president.

Tennessee was won by Ulysses S. Grant, formerly the 6th Commanding General of the United States Army (R-Illinois), running with Speaker of the House Schuyler Colfax, with 68.43% of the popular vote, against the 18th governor of New York, Horatio Seymour (D–New York), running with former Senator Francis Preston Blair Jr., with 31.57% of the vote.

With 68.43% of the popular vote, Tennessee would be Grant's fourth strongest victory in terms of popular vote percentage after Vermont, Massachusetts and Kansas.

This was the last presidential election in which Tennessee would back the Republican nominee until 1920.

== Results ==
1868 United States presidential election in Tennessee
Party	Candidate	Running mate	Popular vote		Electoral vote	
Party	Candidate	Running mate	Count	%	Count	%
Republican	Ulysses S. Grant of Illinois	Schuyler Colfax of Indiana	56,628	68.43%	10	100.00%
Democratic	Horatio Seymour of New York	Francis Preston Blair Jr. of Missouri	26,129	31.57%	0	0.00%
Total			82,757	100.00%	10	100.00%

== See also ==
- United States presidential elections in Tennessee
