= Barnabas Burns =

American politician

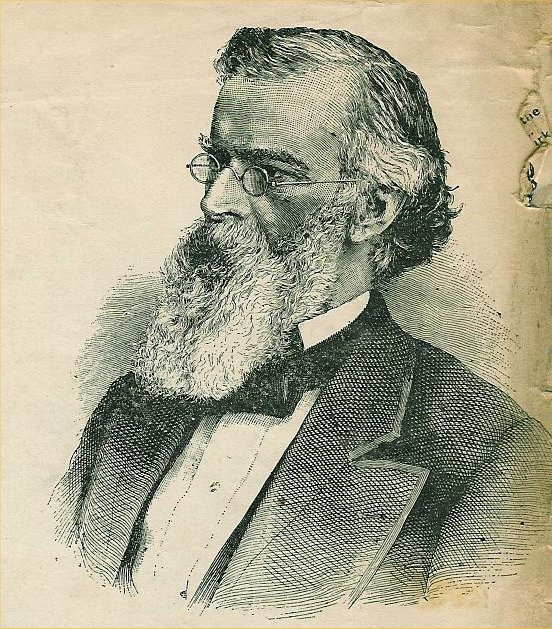

Member of the Ohio Senate from the Richland County district
- In office December 6, 1847 – January 5, 1852
- Preceded by: Joseph Newman
- Succeeded by: John Mack in 29th district

Personal details
- Born: June 29, 1817 Fayette County, Pennsylvania, United States
- Died: October 13, 1883 (aged 66)
- Party: Democratic
- Spouse: Writh Gore
- Children: five

Military service
- Allegiance: United States
- Branch/service: Union Army
- Years of service: 1862
- Rank: Colonel
- Unit: 86th Ohio Infantry

Barnabas Burns (June 29, 1817 – October 13, 1883) was an Ohio lawyer, businessman, and politician.

Burns was born in Fayette County, Pennsylvania, in 1817, the youngest of three children of Andrew and Sarah (Caldwell) Burns. Burns's father was an Irish immigrant and his mother was also of Irish ancestry. In about 1820, the family moved to Richland County, Ohio, where Andrew worked as a farmer. He was educated in the public schools there and taught school after graduating. He married Urath Gore, a Maryland native, and with her had five children.

In 1840, Burns was hired as deputy clerk of courts in Richland County. In 1846 he was elected, as a Democrat, to represent the area in the Ohio State Senate, serving two terms. He read law at the office of Thomas W. Bartley and Samuel J. Kirkwood and was admitted to the bar, practicing in the county seat, Mansfield. In 1860, Burns ran for a seat in the federal House of Representatives, losing to the incumbent, Republican John Sherman. He also served as a delegate to the 1860 Democratic National Convention.

At the outbreak of Civil War, Burns supported the Union and considered himself a War Democrat. The governor, David Tod, offered Burns the colonelcy of the 86th Ohio Infantry; he accepted, but served very little because of chronic lung problems. He did serve as judge advocate at a military trial later in the war. In 1863, while serving as chairman of the Ohio Democratic Party, Burns wrote to General Ulysses S. Grant, asking permission to nominate him for president as a Democrat at the upcoming state convention (Grant was not interested). After the war, Burns continued his political activity, running for Congress again in an 1868 special election that followed the sudden death of Cornelius S. Hamilton; he lost by 385 votes to John Beatty. The same year, he served as a delegate to the 1868 Democratic National Convention. Burns was also a delegate to Ohio's 1873 constitutional convention (the resulting constitution was rejected by the voters.) That same year, Burns ran for lieutenant governor, and lost to Republican Alphonso Hart by just 635 votes.

Burns also entered the business world after the war, organizing the Mansfield Saving Bank in 1869 and serving as its first president. By 1870, he owned property worth $40,000. He served on the board of education and was trustee of an orphanage in Xenia, as well as being one of the founders of the Mansfield Lyceum and Library. He was also a member of the Oddfellows and the Richland County Bible Society.

== Sources ==
- Baughman, Abraham J. (1901). A Centennial Biographical History of Richland and Ashland Counties, Ohio. Chicago, Illinois: The Lewis Publishing Company.
- Simon, John Y. (ed.) (1982). The Papers of Ulysses S. Grant: July 7 - December 31, 1863. Vol. 9. Carbondale, Illinois: Southern Illinois University Press.
- Smith, Jean Edward (2001). Grant. New York, New York: Simon & Schuster. ISBN 978-0-684-84927-0.
- Smith, Joseph Patterson (1898). History of the Republican Party in Ohio. Vol. 1. Chicago, Illinois: The Lewis Publishing Company.

Party political offices
Preceded by Samuel Furman Hunt	Democratic Party nominee for Lieutenant Governor of Ohio; 1873	Succeeded by Samuel Fenton Cary
