= 86th Ohio Infantry Regiment =

- Active: June 10, 1862, to September 25, 1862 (3 months; July 17, 1863, to February 10, 1864 (6 months)
- Country: United States
- Allegiance: Union
- Branch: Infantry
- Engagements: Morgan's Raid; Battle of Cumberland Gap

The 86th Ohio Infantry Regiment, sometimes 86th Ohio Volunteer Infantry (or 86th OVI) was an infantry regiment in the Union Army during the American Civil War.

== Service ==
=== Three-months regiment ===
The 86th Ohio Infantry was organized at Camp Chase in Columbus, Ohio and mustered in for three months service on June 10, 1862, under Colonel Barnabas Burns.

The regiment moved to Clarksburg, Va., June 16–17, and was assigned to Kelly's Railroad Command, June 19. Railroad guard duty at Clarksburg June 17 to August 21. Companies A, C, H, and I on duty at Parkersburg July 27 to August 21. Expedition from Clarksburg to Huttonville to intercept raid by Jenkins August 21–25. Garrison duty at Clarksburg, also constructing fortifications and guarding stores August 25 to September 17. Ordered to Camp Delaware, Ohio, September 17.

The 86th Ohio Infantry first mustered out at Camp Delaware in Delaware, Ohio, on September 25, 1862.

=== Six-months regiment ===
The 86th Ohio Infantry was reorganized at Camp Cleveland near Cleveland, Ohio, on July 17, 1863, and mustered in for six months service under the command of Colonel Wilson C. Lemert.

The regiment was attached to DeCourcy's Brigade, Willcox's Left Wing forces, XXIII Corps, Department of the Ohio, to October 1863. 3rd Brigade, 2nd Division, IX Corps, Department of the Ohio, to February 1864.

The 86th Ohio Infantry mustered out of service at Cleveland, Ohio, on February 10, 1864.

== Detailed service ==
Moved to Zanesville, Ohio, July 19. Expedition from Zanesville to Eagleport, Ohio, to intercept John Hunt Morgan July 20–24. Skirmish at Eagleport July 20. Expedition from Zanesville to Cambridge, Ohio, in pursuit of Morgan July 19–25. Skirmish near New Lisbon July 26. Capture of Morgan's command near Salineville July 26. Moved to Camp Nelson, Ky., August 8–11. Expedition under DeCourcy to Cumberland Gap August 17-September 7, 1863. Operations about Cumberland Gap September 7–10. Capture of Cumberland Gap September 9. Occupation of Rocky Fort September 9. Garrison at Cumberland Gap September 9, 1863, to January 16, 1864. March to Nicholasville, Ky., January 16–23, thence moved to Cleveland, Ohio, January 23–26.

== Casualties ==
The regiment lost a total of 37 enlisted men during service, all due to disease.

== Commanders ==
- Colonel Barnabas Burns [three-months regiment]
- Colonel Wilson C. Lemert [six-months regiment]

== Notable members ==
- Lieutenant Colonel Robert White McFarland - president of Miami University, 1885-1888
- Sergeant Archibald MacNeal Willard, Company C - painter, best known for The Spirit of '76

== See also ==
- List of Ohio Civil War units
- Ohio in the Civil War
