= 1868 Democratic National Convention =

U.S. political event held in Tammany Hall in New York City

- 1868 presidential election
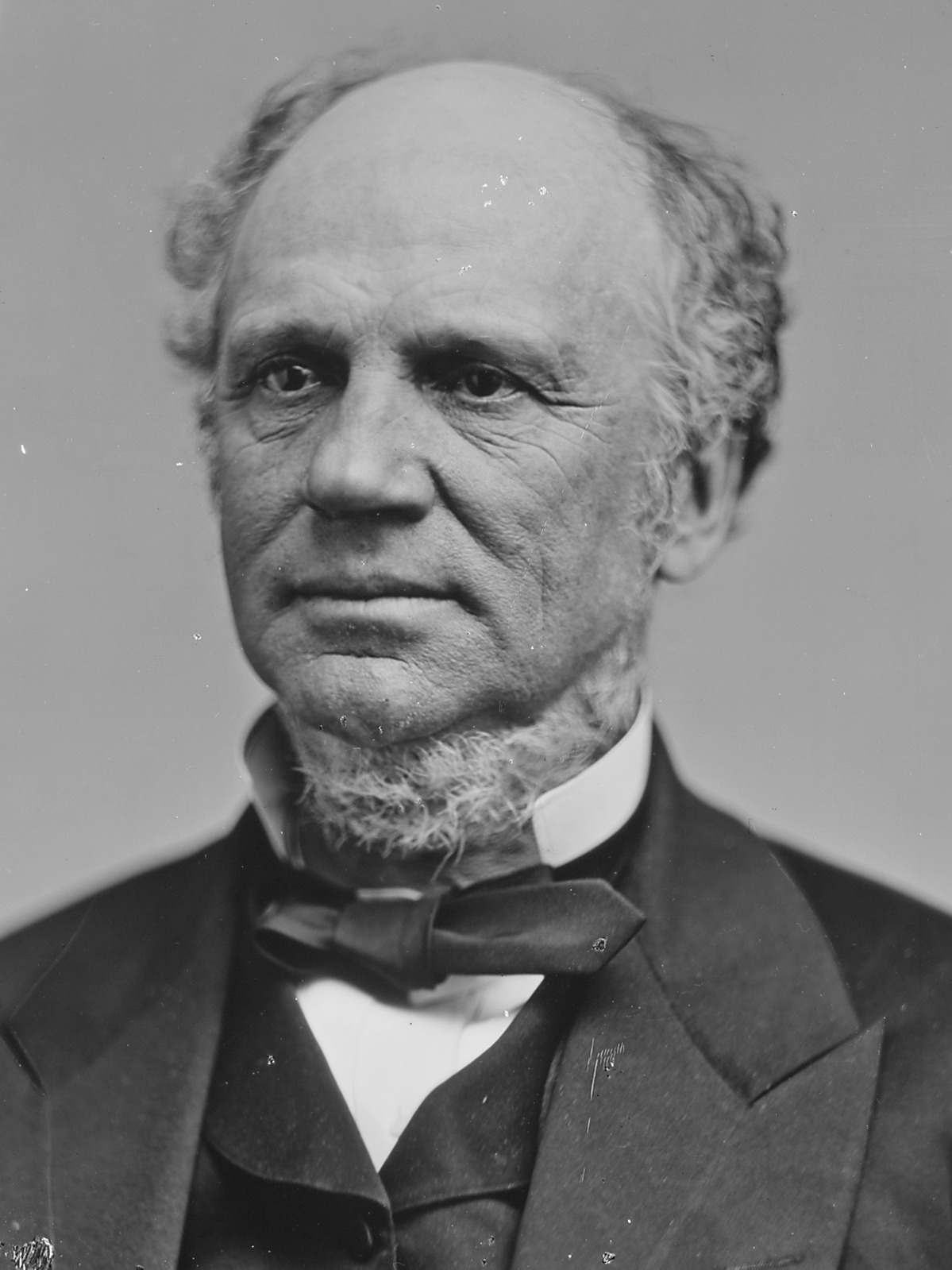
- Nominees; Seymour and Blair

Convention
- Dates: July 4–9, 1868
- City: New York City, New York
- Venue: Tammany Hall headquarters building

Candidates
- Presidential nominee: Horatio Seymour of New York
- Vice-presidential nominee: Francis Preston Blair Jr. of Missouri
- Results (president): Seymour (New York): 317 (100%)
- Results (vice president): Blair (Missouri): 317 (100%)
- Ballots: 22

The 1868 Democratic National Convention was held at the Tammany Hall headquarters building in New York City between July 4, and July 9, 1868. The first Democratic convention after the conclusion of the American Civil War, the convention marked the return of Democratic Party politicians from the Southern United States.

== Venue ==
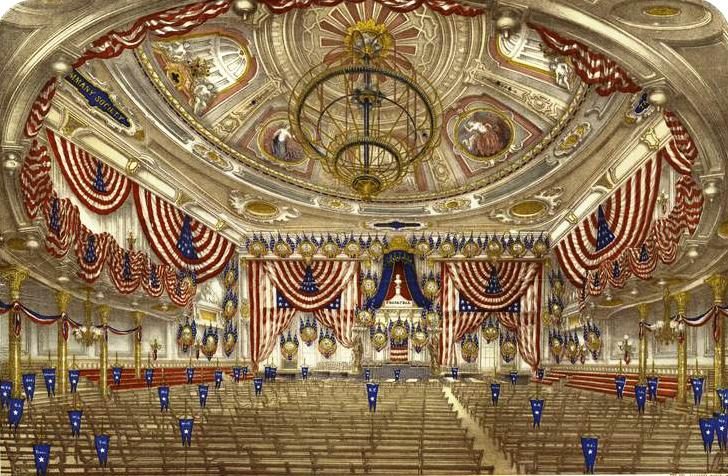
Illustration showing the interior of the Tammany Hall headquarters decorated for the convention

The convention was held at the new Tammany Hall building on East 14th Street in Manhattan, New York City, which replaced the organization's earlier headquarters. For the convention, the hall was elaborately decorated.

== Convention officers ==
Horatio Seymour, the former governor of New York, served as the permanent chairman of the convention. Each state delegation had a vice president and secretary to the convention.

Henry L. Palmer of Wisconsin served as the convention's temporary chairman, after the convention voted on the opening day to appoint him after he was nominated by Democratic National Committee Chairman August Belmont.

== Events of the convention ==
On July 4, 1868, coinciding with the first day of the Democratic National Convention, the Soldiers and Sailors National Convention was held at the Cooper Institute, also in New York City. On July 6, a committee from that convention was granted privilege to address the Democratic National Convention.

On July 6, an address from the Woman's Suffrage Association was presented and read before the convention.

During the convention, many delegates utilized the catch phrase, "this is a white man's country, let white men rule".

== Presidential nomination ==
=== Presidential candidates ===
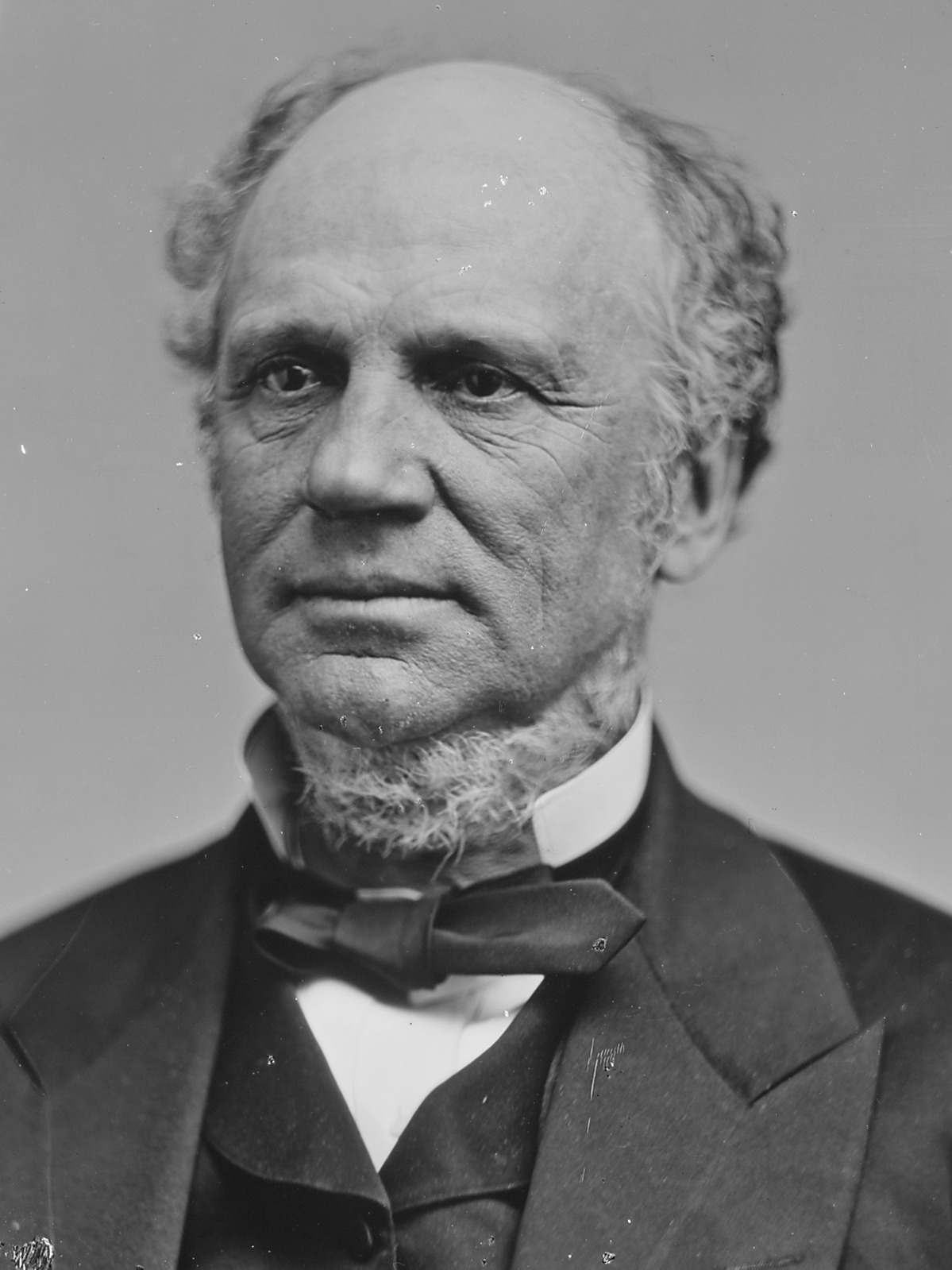
Former Governor
Horatio Seymour
of New York

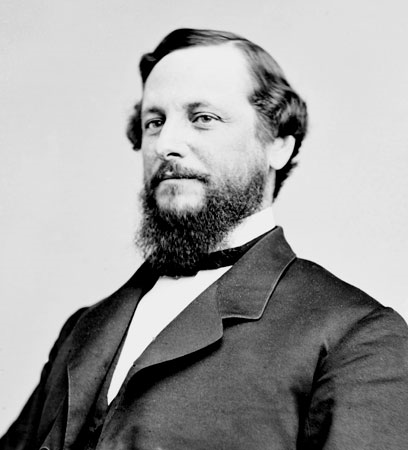
Former Representative George H. Pendleton
from Ohio

Senator
Thomas A. Hendricks
from Indiana

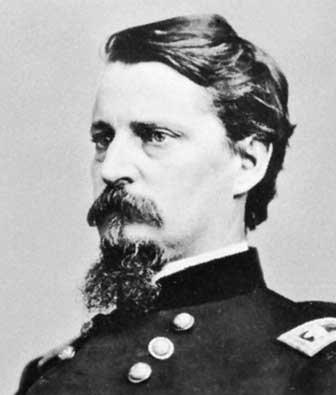
Major General
Winfield Scott Hancock
from Pennsylvania

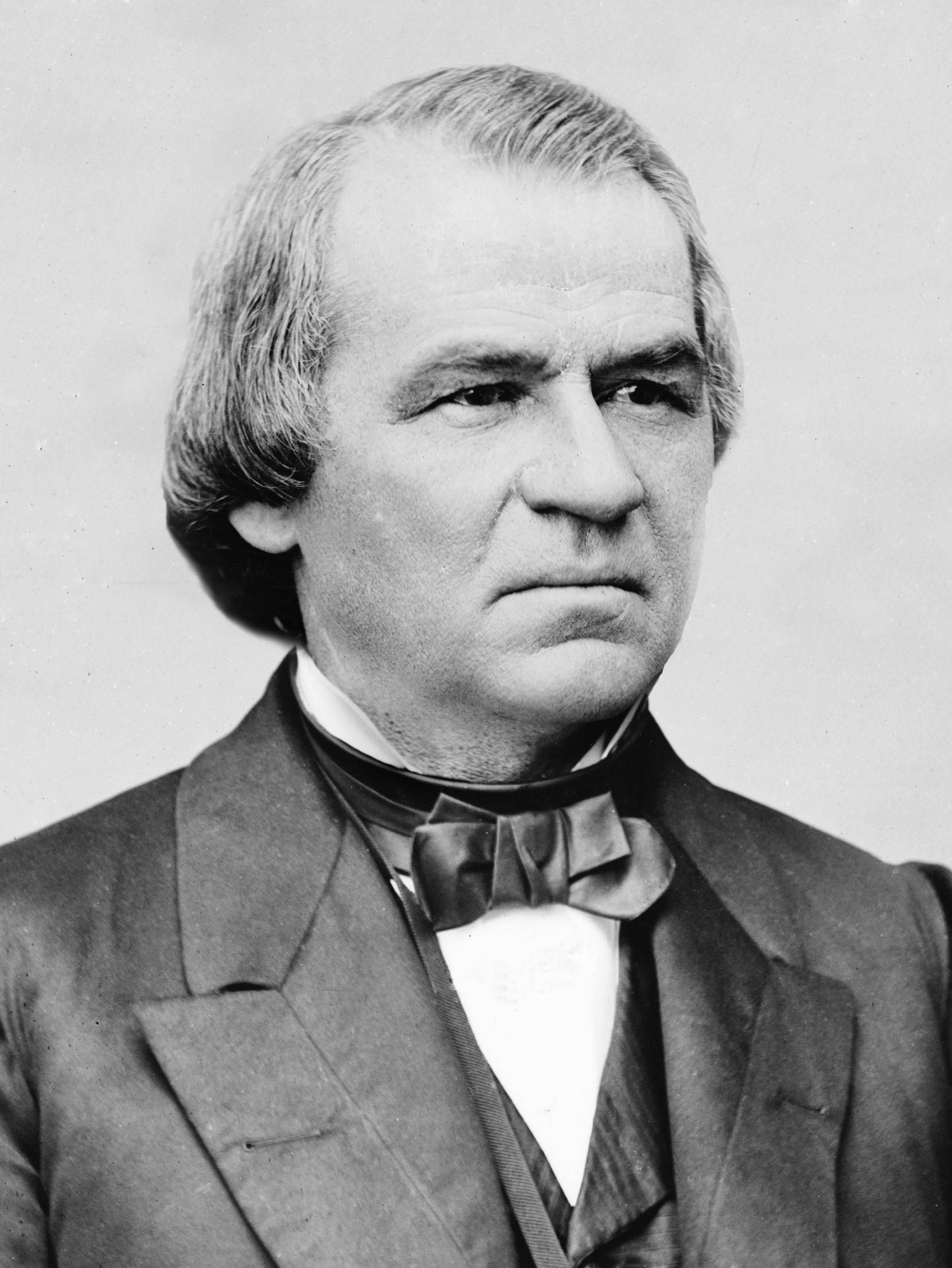
President
Andrew Johnson from Tennessee

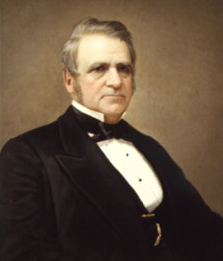
Former Lieutenant Governor
Sanford E. Church
of New York

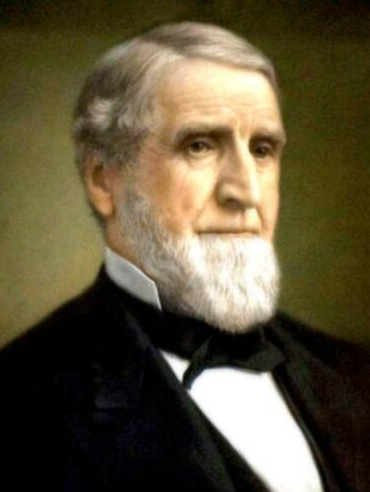
Former Representative Asa Packer from Pennsylvania

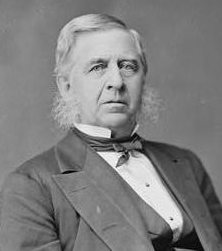
Governor
James E. English
of Connecticut

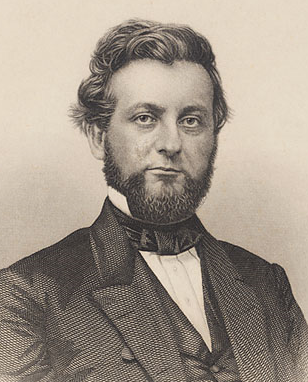
Former Governor
Joel Parker
of New Jersey

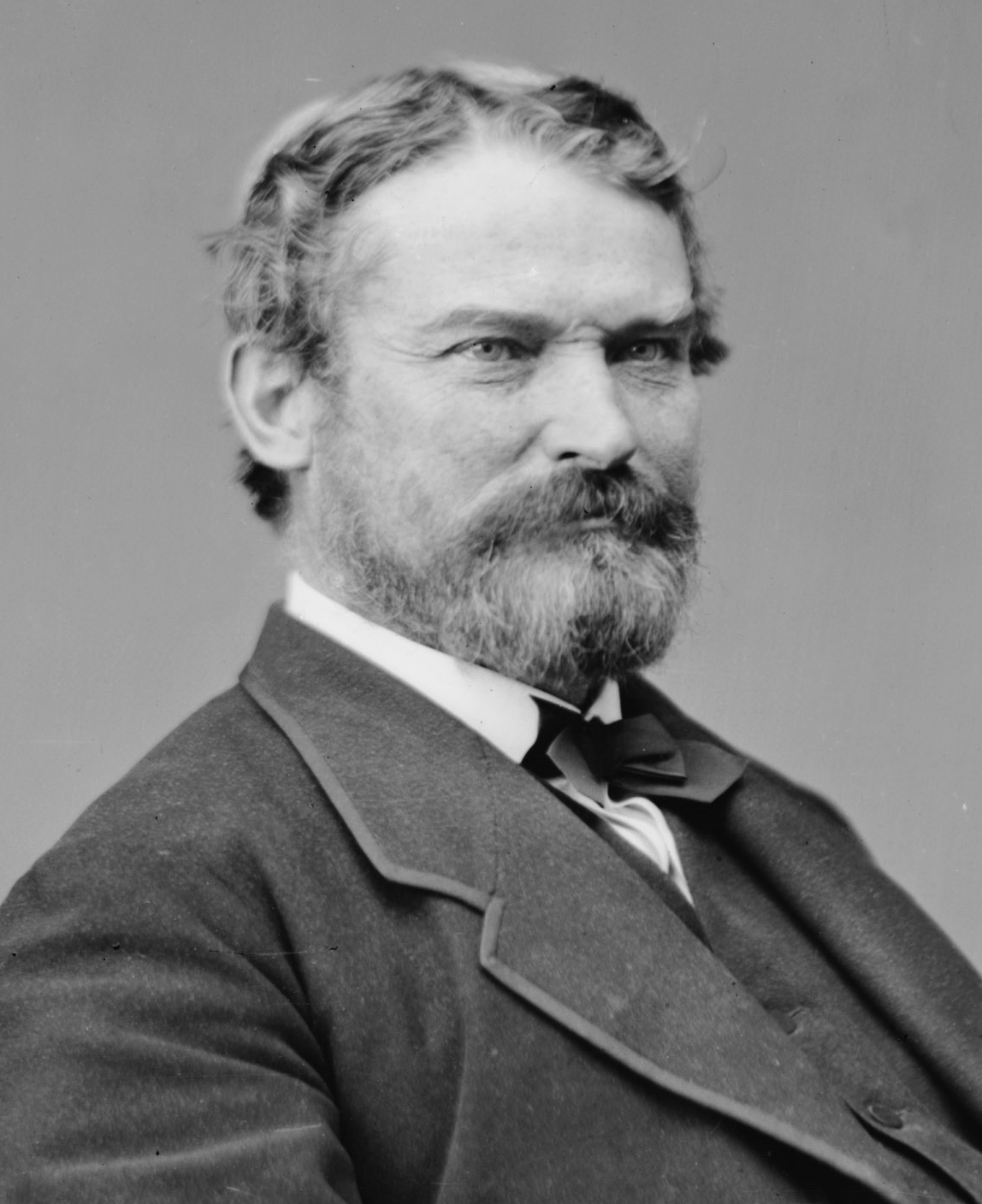
Senator
James Rood Doolittle
from Wisconsin

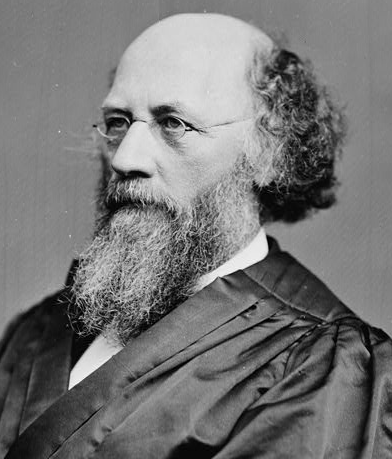
Associate Justice Stephen J. Field
from California

Former Representative Francis Preston Blair Jr.
from Missouri

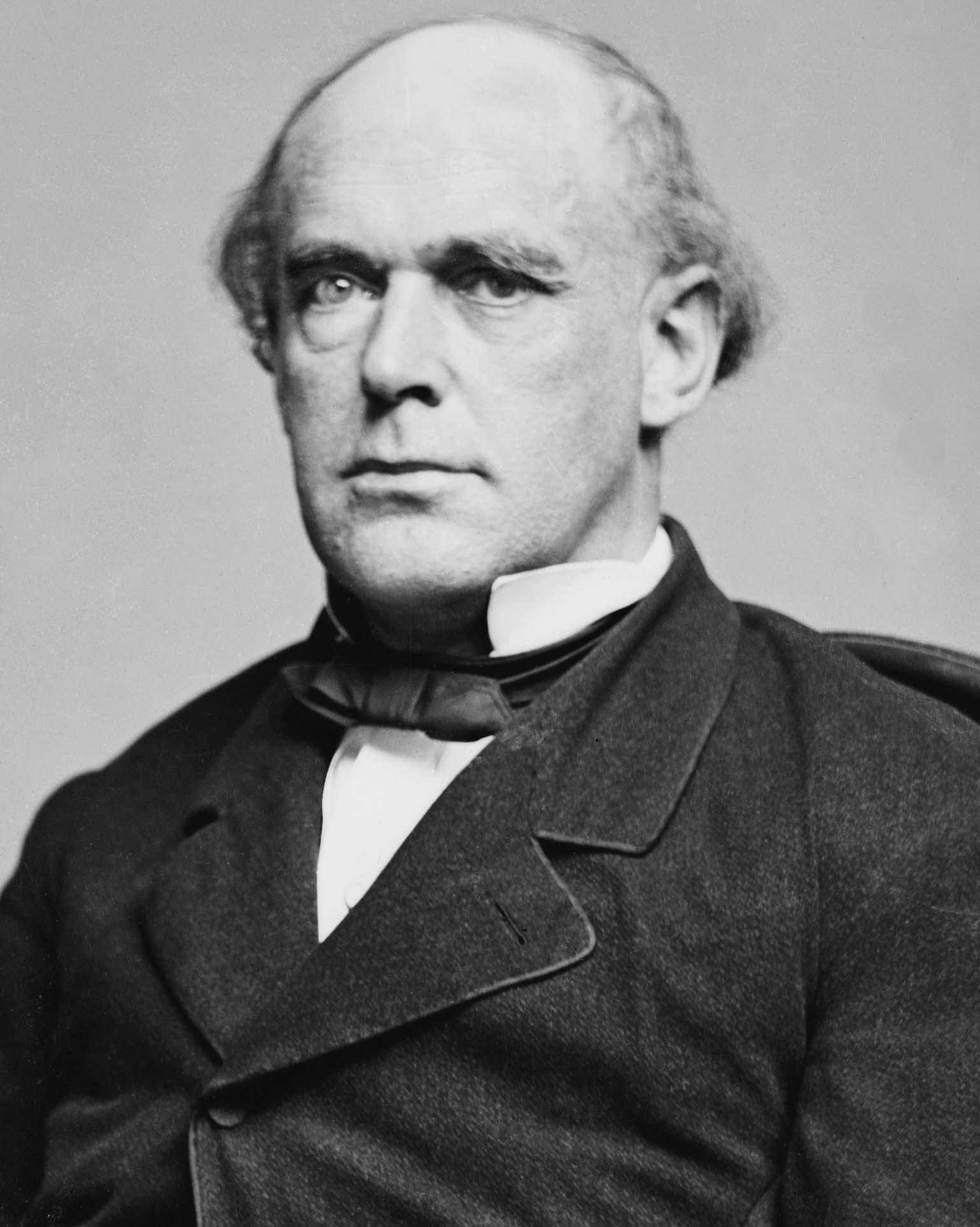
Chief Justice
Salmon P. Chase
from Ohio
(not nominated)

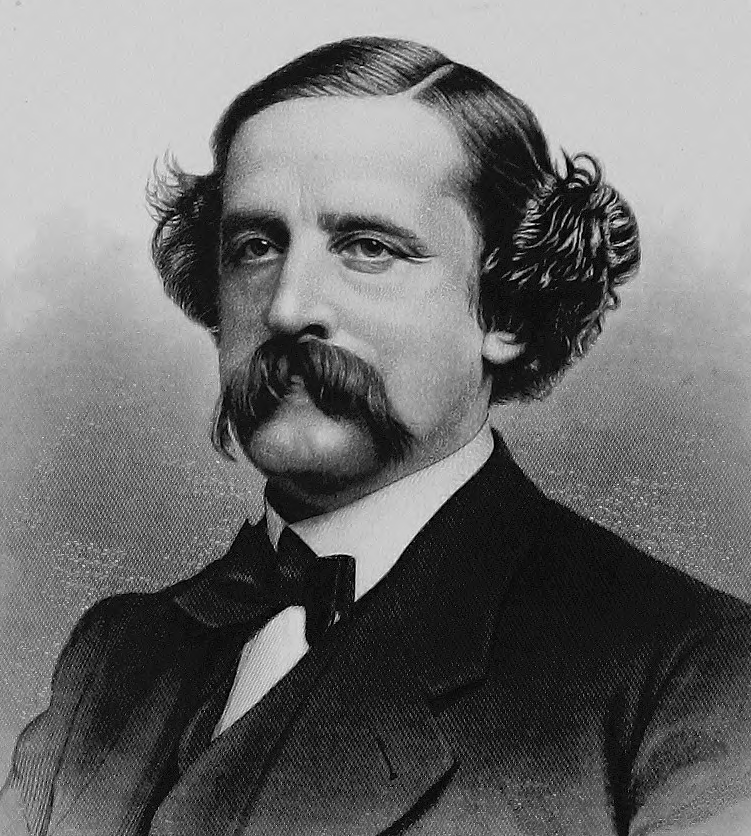
New York City Mayor John T. Hoffman
from New York

The front-runner in the early balloting was George H. Pendleton, who led on the first 15 ballots, followed in varying order by incumbent president Andrew Johnson, Winfield Scott Hancock, Sanford Church, Asa Packer, Joel Parker, James E. English, James Rood Doolittle, and Thomas A. Hendricks.

Three-fourth of the delegates from southern states gave their support to Johnson. The unpopular Johnson, having narrowly survived impeachment, won 65 votes on the first ballot; the second-highest number of votes after Pendleton, but less than one-third of the total necessary for nomination, and he thus lost his bid for election as president in his own right. His vote tally rapidly dropped away thereafter, and from the eighth ballot onwards, he would only receive votes from his home state of Tennessee.

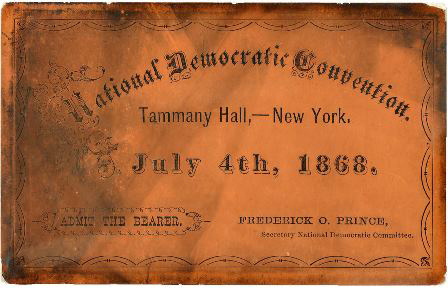
Admission ticket to the convention

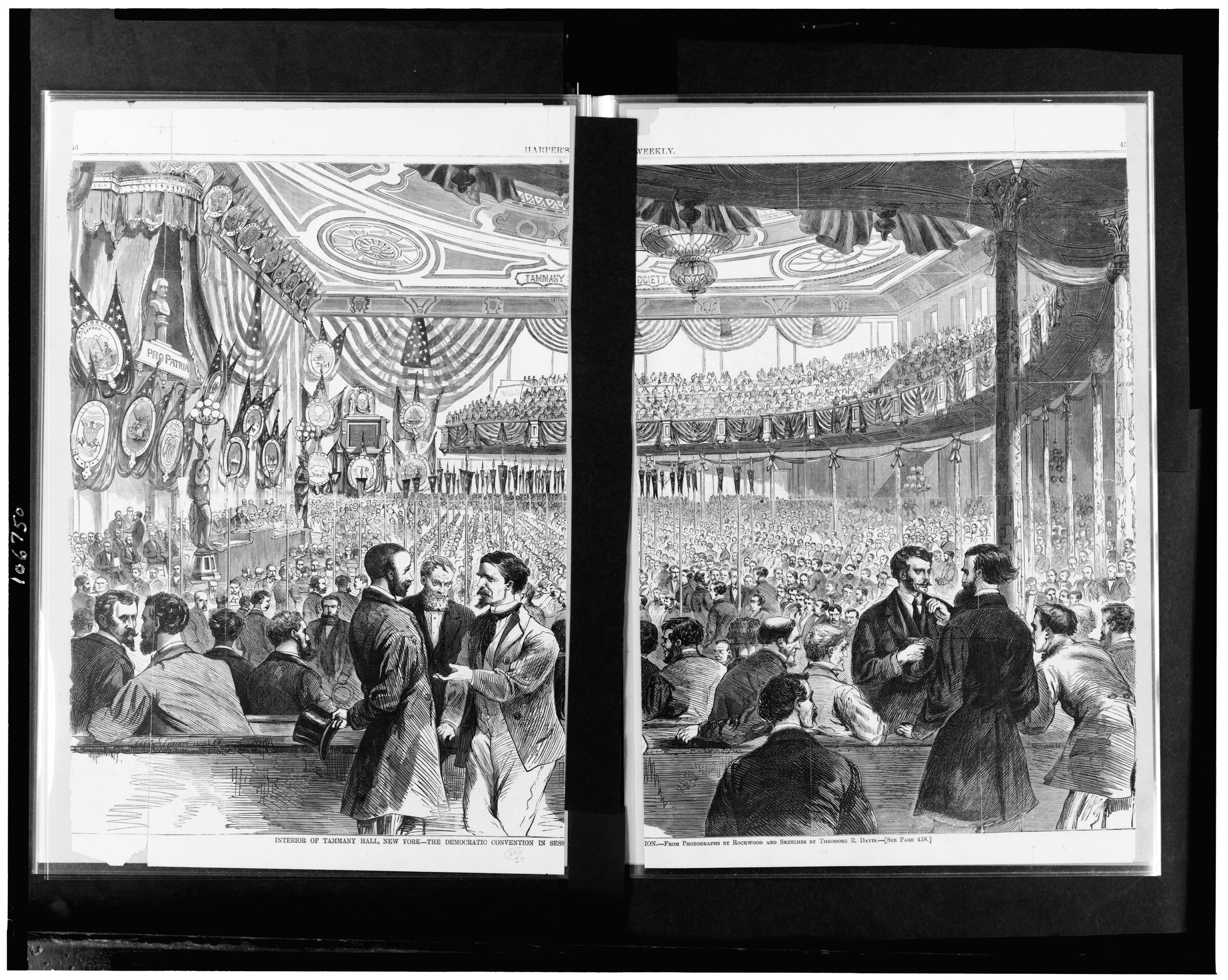
Sketch by Theodore R. Davis for Harper's Weekly of the convention in session

Meanwhile, the convention chairman Horatio Seymour, former governor of New York, received 9 votes on the fourth ballot from the state of North Carolina. This unexpected move caused "loud and enthusiastic cheering," but Seymour refused, saying,

I must not be nominated by this Convention, as I could not accept the nomination if tendered. My own inclination prompted me to decline at the outset; my honor compels me to do so now. It is impossible, consistently with my position, to allow my name to be mentioned in this Convention against my protest. The clerk will proceed with the call.

After numerous indecisive ballots, the names of John T. Hoffman, Francis P. Blair, and Stephen Johnson Field were placed in nomination. This raised the number of names placed into nomination to thirteen. None of these new candidates, however, gained much traction.

For twenty-one ballots, the opposing candidates battled it out: the East battling the West for control, the conservatives battling the radicals. The two leading candidates were determined that the other should not receive the nomination; because of the two-thirds rule of the convention, a compromise candidate was needed. Seymour still hoped it would be Chief Justice Salmon P. Chase, but on the twenty-second ballot, the chairman of the Ohio delegation announced, "at the unanimous request and demand of the delegation I place Horatio Seymour in nomination with twenty-one votes-against his inclination, but no longer against his honor."

Seymour had to wait for the rousing cheers to die down before he could address the delegates and decline.

I have no terms in which to tell of my regret that my name has been brought before this convention. God knows that my life and all that I value most in life I would give for the good of my country, which I believe to be identified with that of the Democratic party...

"Take the nomination, then!" cried someone from the floor.

...but when I said that I could not be a candidate, I meant it! I could not receive the nomination without placing not only myself but the Democratic party in a false position. God bless you for your kindness to me, but your candidate I cannot be.

Seymour left the platform to cool off and rest. No sooner had he left the hall than former representative Clement Vallandigham, a member of the Ohio delegation and one-time ally of Seymour, rose and proclaimed that the delegation would not accept Seymour's refusal, and that he was the only man who could break the deadlock at the convention, much less win the presidency. The chairman of New York's delegation then stood and, while bound by the convention rules not to switch its votes (which it had already cast for Hendricks) until the round of balloting had concluded, made a passionate speech in support of Seymour. The roll call continued, with Seymour only picking up one additional vote (from Tennessee), but the final state, Wisconsin, cast a blank ballot which it then immediately switched to Seymour. This started a stampede with all the remaining states quickly throwing their support behind Seymour, eventually leading to his being nominated unanimously.

In 1868, the States of Arkansas, Alabama, Florida, North Carolina, South Carolina, Georgia, and Louisiana were readmitted to the Union. Nebraska had been admitted to the Union on March 1, 1867. Texas, Mississippi and Virginia had not yet been readmitted to the Union.

=== Balloting ===
Presidential ballot (1st day)
| | 1st | 2nd | 3rd | 4th | 5th | 6th |
|---|---|---|---|---|---|---|
| Seymour | 0 | 0 | 0 | 9 | 0 | 0 |
| Pendleton | 105 | 104 | 119.5 | 118.5 | 122 | 122.5 |
| Hendricks | 2.5 | 2 | 9.5 | 11.5 | 19.5 | 30 |
| Hancock | 33.5 | 40.5 | 45.5 | 43.5 | 46 | 47 |
| A. Johnson | 65 | 52 | 34.5 | 32 | 24 | 21 |
| Church | 34 | 33 | 33 | 33 | 33 | 33 |
| Packer | 26 | 26 | 26 | 26 | 27 | 27 |
| English | 16 | 12.5 | 7.5 | 7.5 | 7 | 6 |
| Parker | 13 | 15.5 | 13 | 13 | 13 | 13 |
| Doolittle | 13 | 12.5 | 12 | 12 | 15 | 12 |
| Field | 0 | 0 | 0 | 0 | 0 | 0 |
| Blair | 0.5 | 10.5 | 4.5 | 2 | 9.5 | 5 |
| R. Johnson | 8.5 | 8 | 11 | 8 | 0 | 0 |
| Chase | 0 | 0 | 0 | 0 | 0 | 0 |
| T. Seymour | 0 | 0 | 0 | 0 | 0 | 0 |
| Hoffman | 0 | 0 | 0 | 0 | 0 | 0 |
| Ewing | 0 | 0.5 | 1 | 1 | 0 | 0 |
| McClellan | 0 | 0 | 0 | 0 | 0 | 0 |
| Adams | 0 | 0 | 0 | 0 | 1 | 0 |
| Pierce | 0 | 0 | 0 | 0 | 0 | 0 |
| Blank | 0 | 0 | 0 | 0 | 0 | 0.5 |

Presidential ballot (2nd day)
| | 7th | 8th | 9th | 10th | 11th | 12th | 13th | 14th | 15th | 16th | 17th | 18th |
|---|---|---|---|---|---|---|---|---|---|---|---|---|
| Seymour | 0 | 0 | 0 | 0 | 0 | 0 | 0 | 0 | 0 | 0 | 0 | 0 |
| Pendleton | 137.5 | 156.5 | 144 | 147.5 | 144.5 | 145.5 | 134.5 | 130 | 129.5 | 107.5 | 70.5 | 56.5 |
| Hendricks | 39.5 | 75 | 80.5 | 82.5 | 88 | 89 | 81 | 84.5 | 82.5 | 70.5 | 80 | 87 |
| Hancock | 42.5 | 28 | 34.5 | 34 | 32.5 | 30 | 48.5 | 56 | 79.5 | 113.5 | 137.5 | 144.5 |
| A. Johnson | 12.5 | 6 | 5.5 | 6 | 5.5 | 4.5 | 4.5 | 0 | 5.5 | 5.5 | 6 | 10 |
| Church | 33 | 0 | 0 | 0 | 0 | 0 | 0 | 0 | 0 | 0 | 0 | 0 |
| Packer | 26 | 26 | 26.5 | 27.5 | 26 | 26 | 26 | 26 | 0 | 0 | 0 | 0 |
| English | 6 | 6 | 6 | 0 | 0 | 0 | 0 | 0 | 0 | 0 | 0 | 0 |
| Parker | 7 | 7 | 7 | 7 | 7 | 7 | 7 | 7 | 7 | 7 | 7 | 3.5 |
| Doolittle | 12 | 12 | 12 | 12 | 12.5 | 12.5 | 13 | 13 | 12 | 12 | 12 | 12 |
| Field | 0 | 0 | 0 | 0 | 0 | 0 | 0 | 0 | 0 | 0 | 0 | 0 |
| Blair | 0.5 | 0.5 | 0.5 | 0.5 | 0.5 | 0.5 | 0.5 | 0 | 0 | 0 | 0 | 0 |
| R. Johnson | 0 | 0 | 0 | 0 | 0 | 0 | 0 | 0 | 0 | 0 | 0 | 0 |
| Chase | 0 | 0 | 0 | 0 | 0 | 0.5 | 0.5 | 0 | 0 | 0 | 0.5 | 0.5 |
| T. Seymour | 0 | 0 | 0 | 0 | 0 | 0 | 0 | 0 | 0 | 0 | 0 | 0 |
| Hoffman | 0 | 0 | 0 | 0 | 0 | 0 | 0 | 0 | 0 | 0 | 3 | 3 |
| Ewing | 0 | 0 | 0 | 0 | 0 | 0 | 0 | 0 | 0 | 0 | 0 | 0 |
| McClellan | 0 | 0 | 0 | 0 | 0 | 1 | 0 | 0 | 0 | 0 | 0 | 0 |
| Adams | 0 | 0 | 0 | 0 | 0 | 0 | 0 | 0 | 0 | 0 | 0 | 0 |
| Pierce | 0 | 0 | 0 | 0 | 0 | 0 | 1 | 0 | 0 | 0 | 0 | 0 |
| Blank | 0.5 | 0 | 0.5 | 0 | 0.5 | 0.5 | 0.5 | 0.5 | 1 | 1 | 0.5 | 0 |

Presidential ballot (3rd day)
| | 19th | 20th | 21st | 22nd (Note: before shifts) | 22nd (Note: after shifts) |
|---|---|---|---|---|---|
| Seymour | 0 | 0 | 0 | 22 | 317 |
| Pendleton | 0 | 0 | 0 | 0 | 0 |
| Hendricks | 107.5 | 121 | 132 | 145.5 | 0 |
| Hancock | 135.5 | 142.5 | 135.5 | 103.5 | 0 |
| A. Johnson | 0 | 0 | 5 | 4 | 0 |
| Church | 0 | 0 | 0 | 0 | 0 |
| Packer | 22 | 0 | 0 | 0 | 0 |
| English | 6 | 16 | 19 | 7 | 0 |
| Parker | 0 | 0 | 0 | 0 | 0 |
| Doolittle | 12 | 12 | 12 | 4 | 0 |
| Field | 15 | 9 | 8 | 0 | 0 |
| Blair | 13.5 | 13 | 0 | 0 | 0 |
| R. Johnson | 0 | 0 | 0 | 0 | 0 |
| Chase | 0.5 | 0 | 4 | 0 | 0 |
| T. Seymour | 4 | 2 | 0 | 0 | 0 |
| Hoffman | 0 | 0 | 0.5 | 0 | 0 |
| Ewing | 0 | 0 | 0 | 0 | 0 |
| McClellan | 0 | 0 | 0.5 | 0 | 0 |
| Adams | 0 | 0 | 0 | 0 | 0 |
| Pierce | 0 | 0 | 0 | 0 | 0 |
| Blank | 1 | 1.5 | 0.5 | 31 | 0 |

1st day of presidential balloting / 3rd day of convention (Tuesday, July 7, 1868)

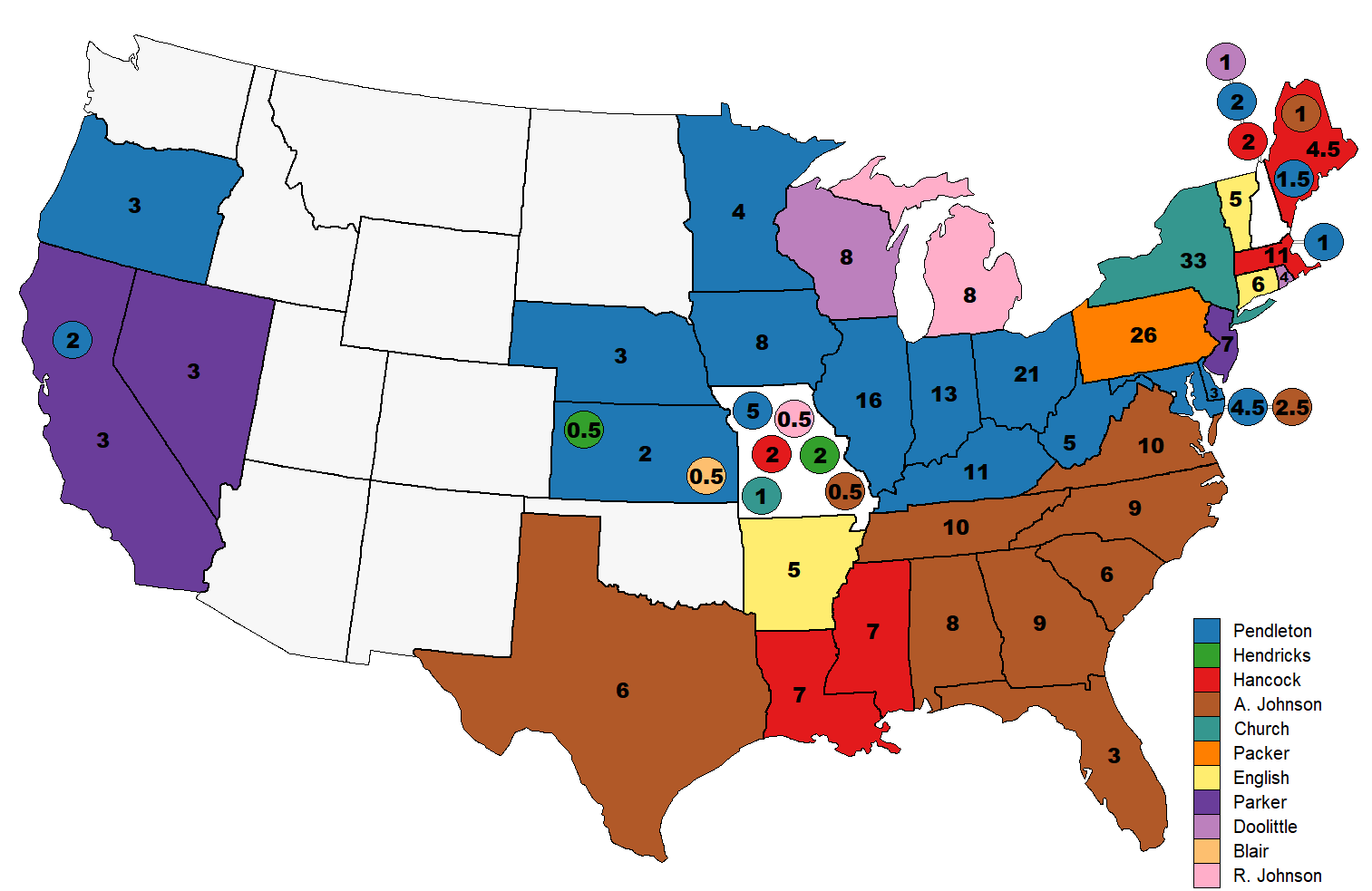
1st presidential ballot

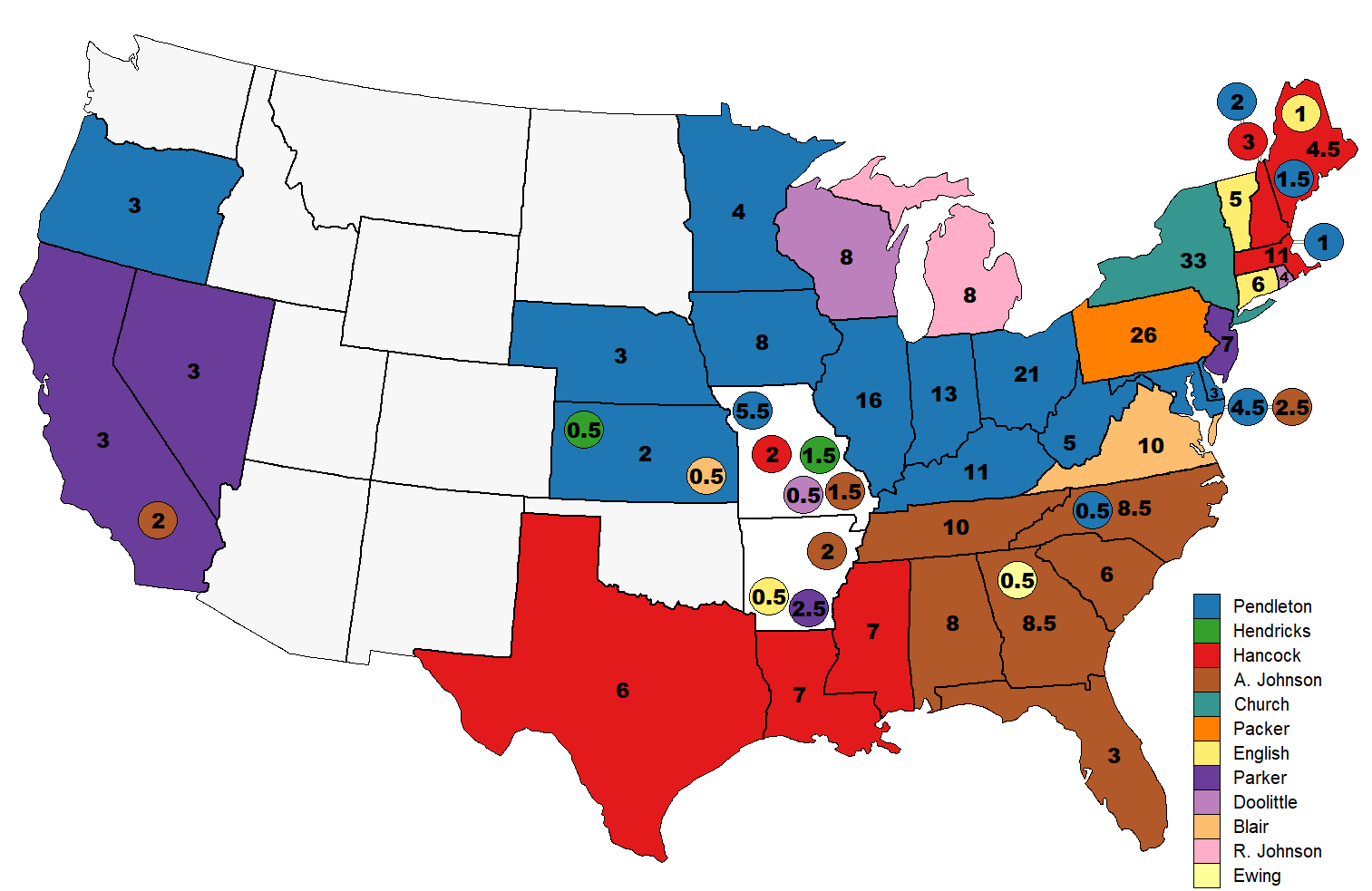
2nd presidential ballot

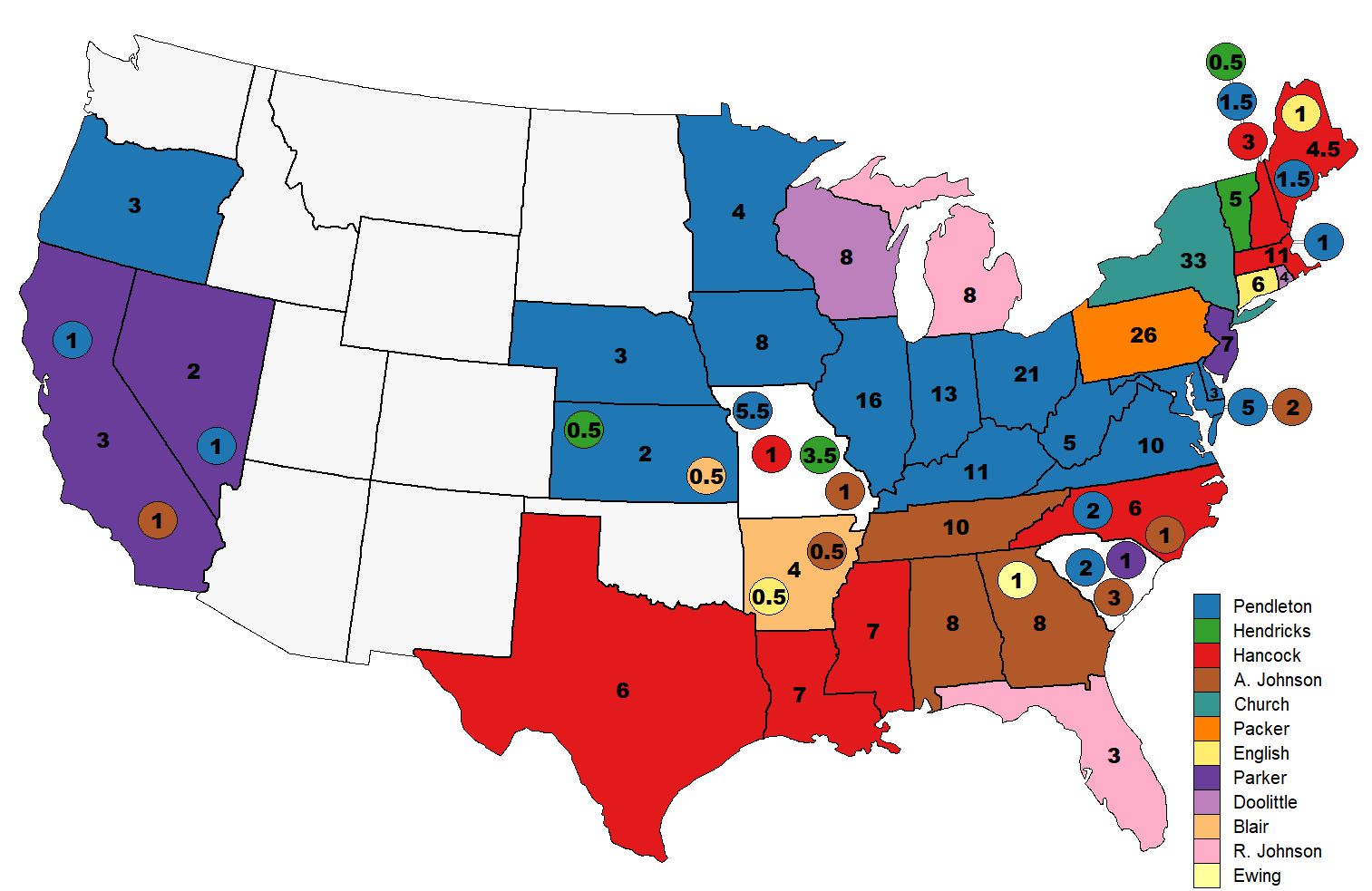
3rd presidential ballot

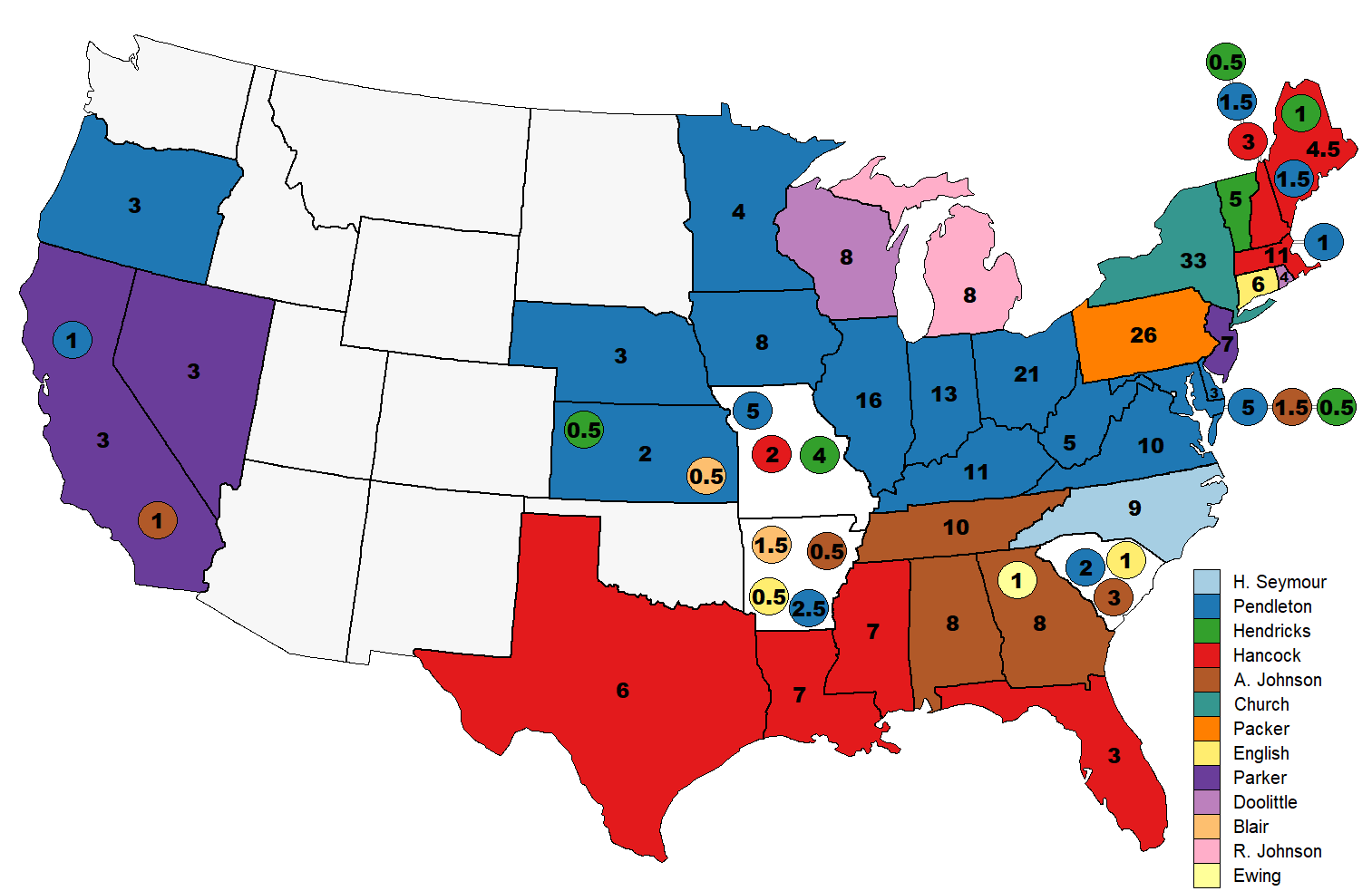
4th presidential ballot

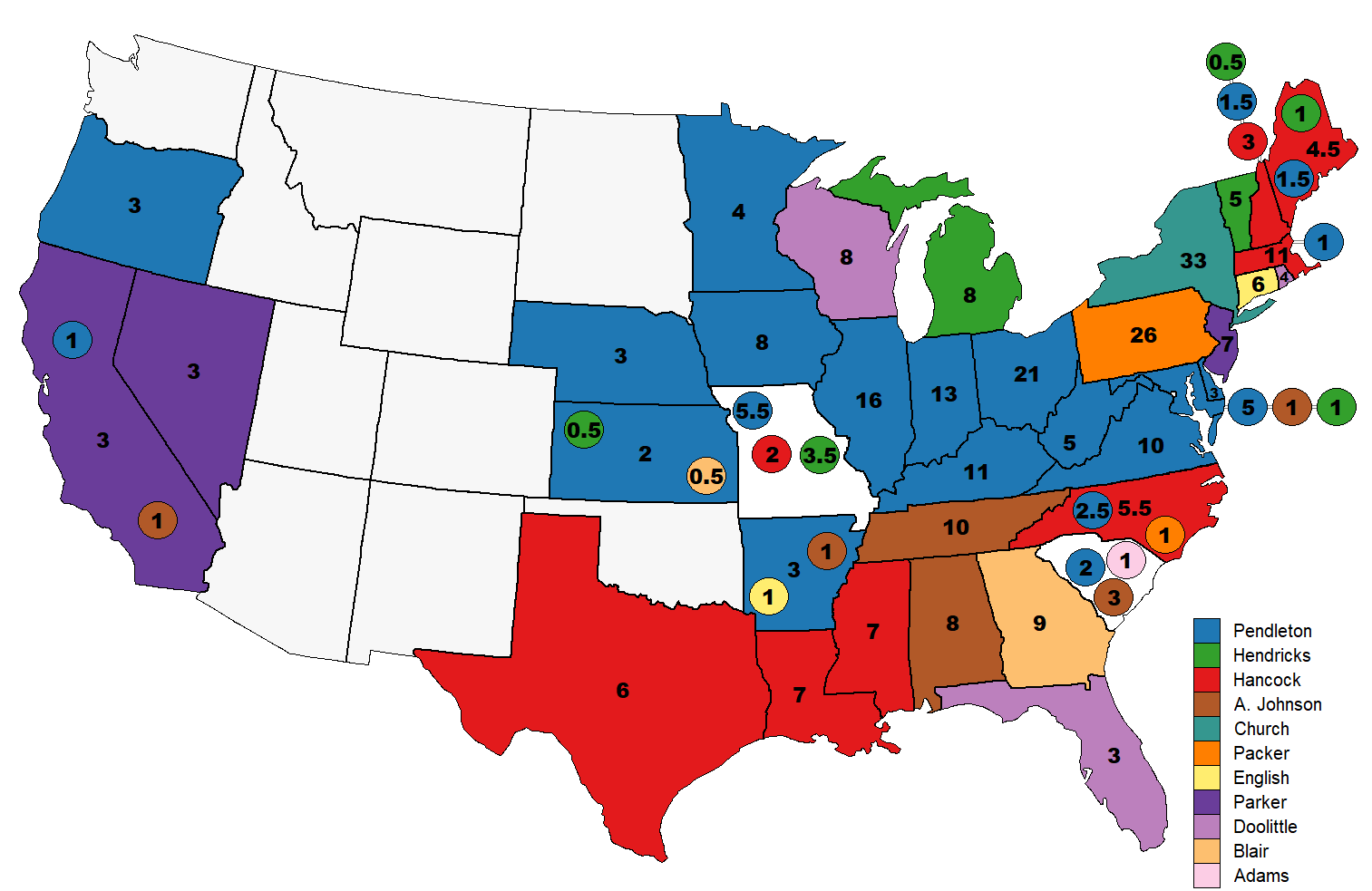
5th presidential ballot

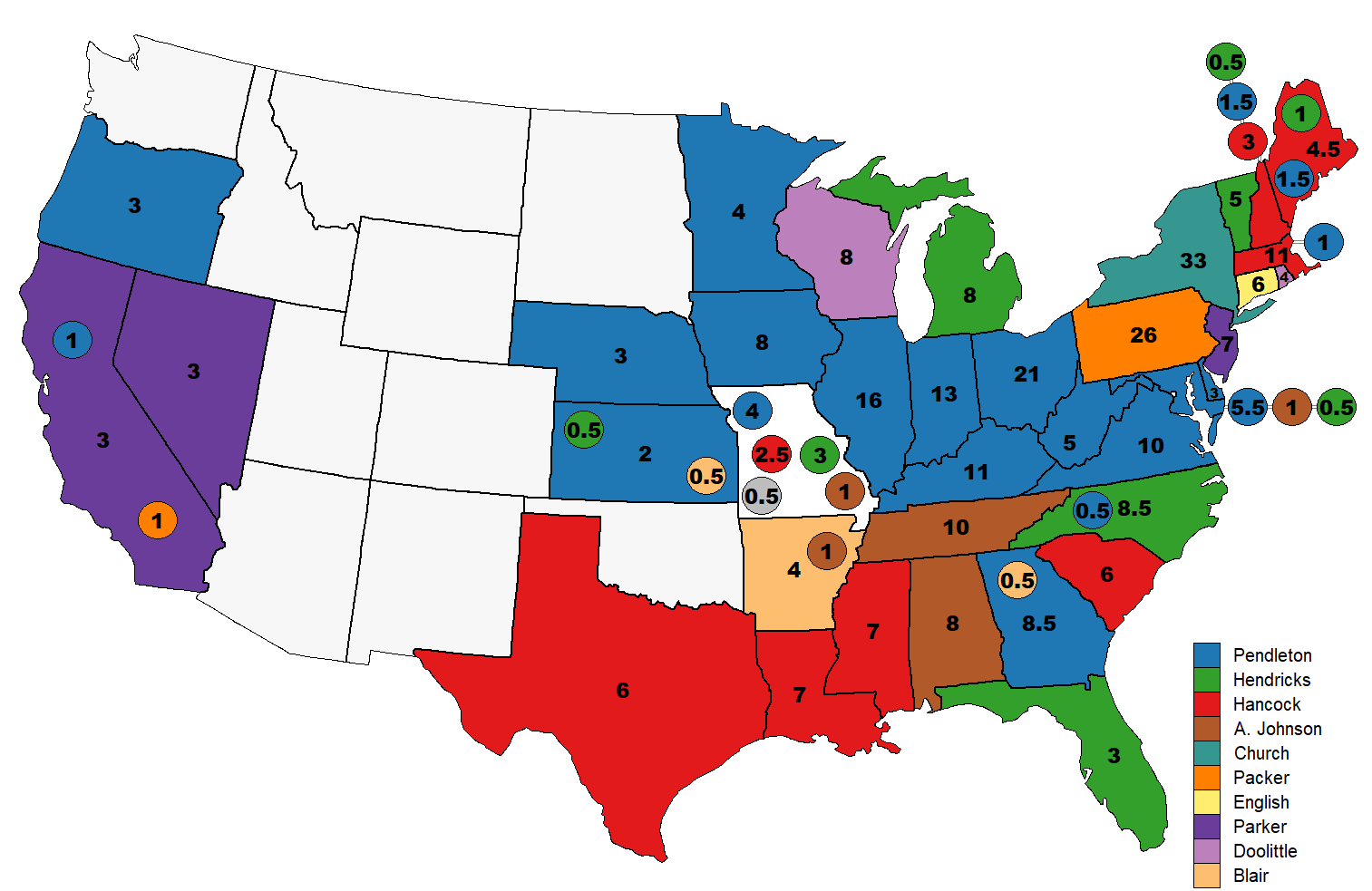
6th presidential ballot

2nd day of presidential balloting / 4th day of convention (Wednesday, July 8, 1868)

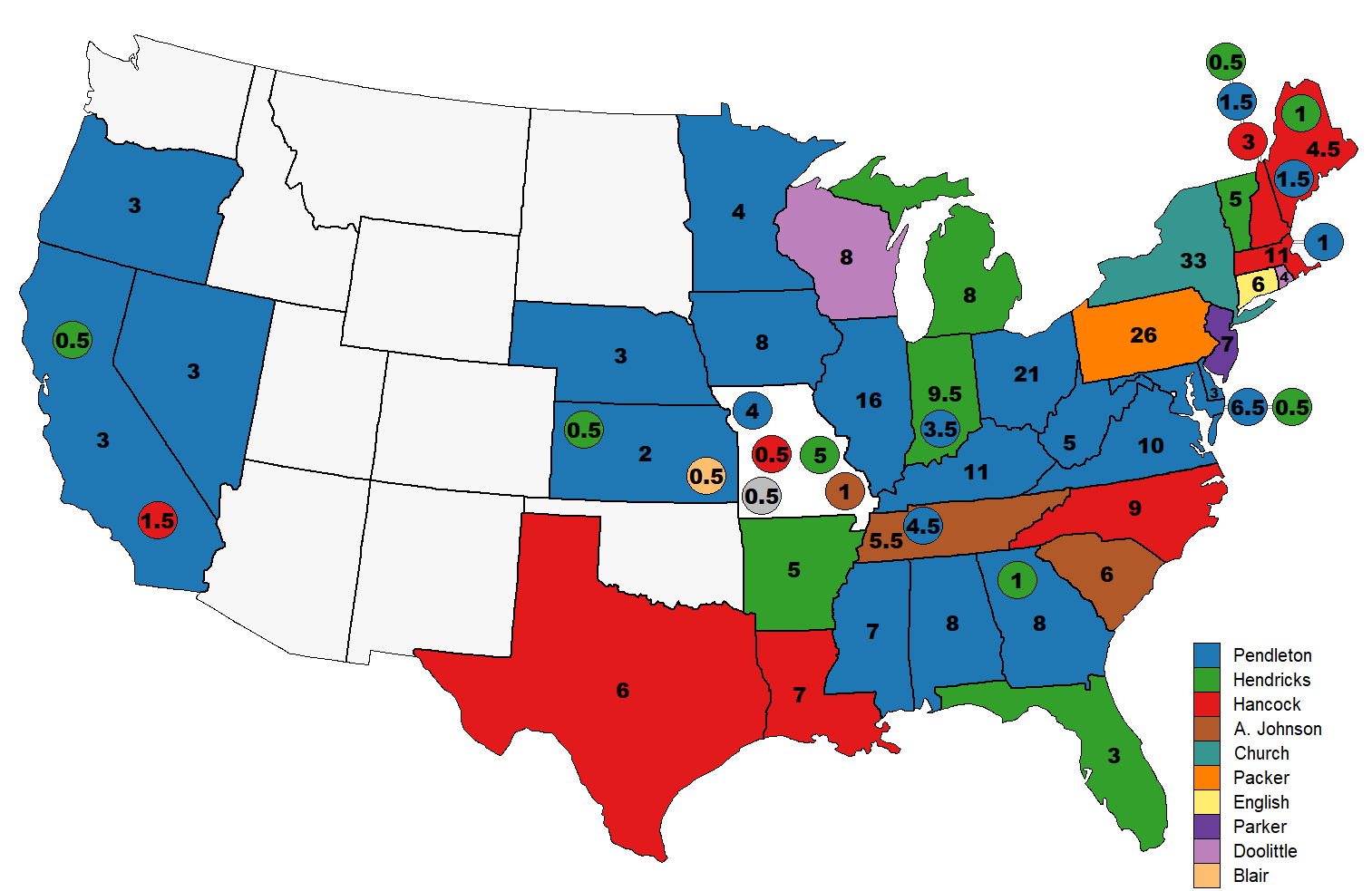
7th presidential ballot

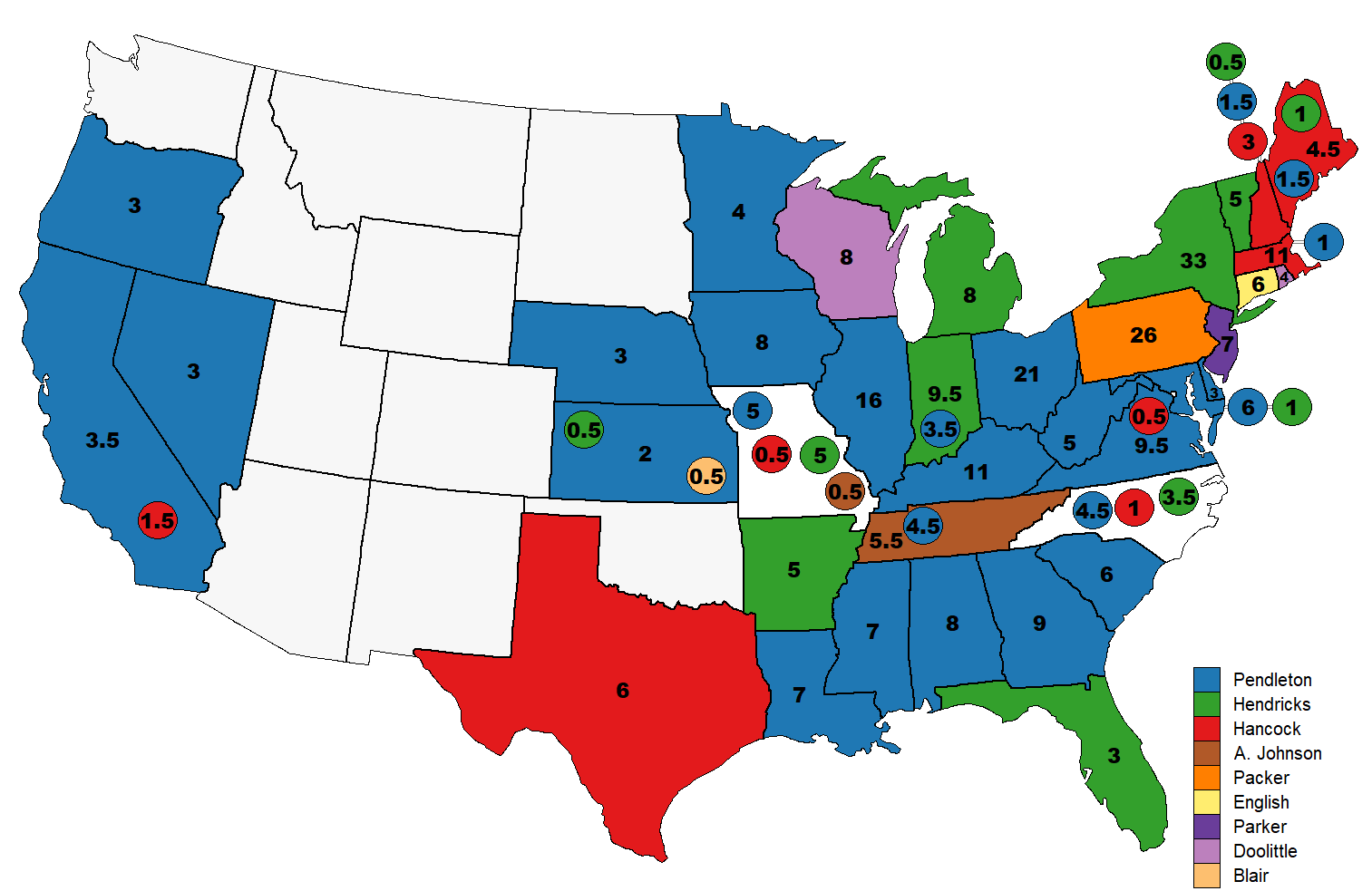
8th presidential ballot

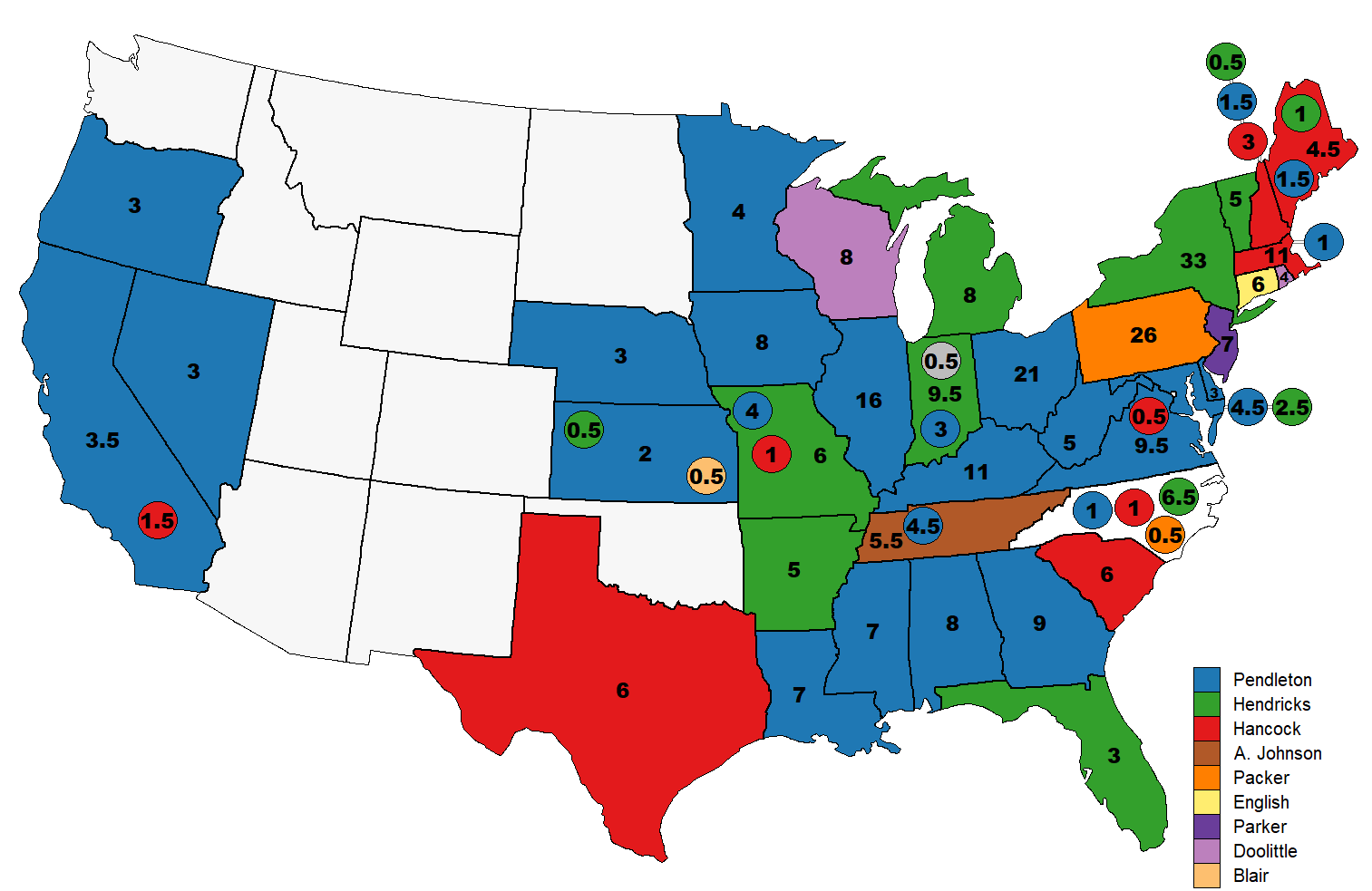
9th presidential ballot

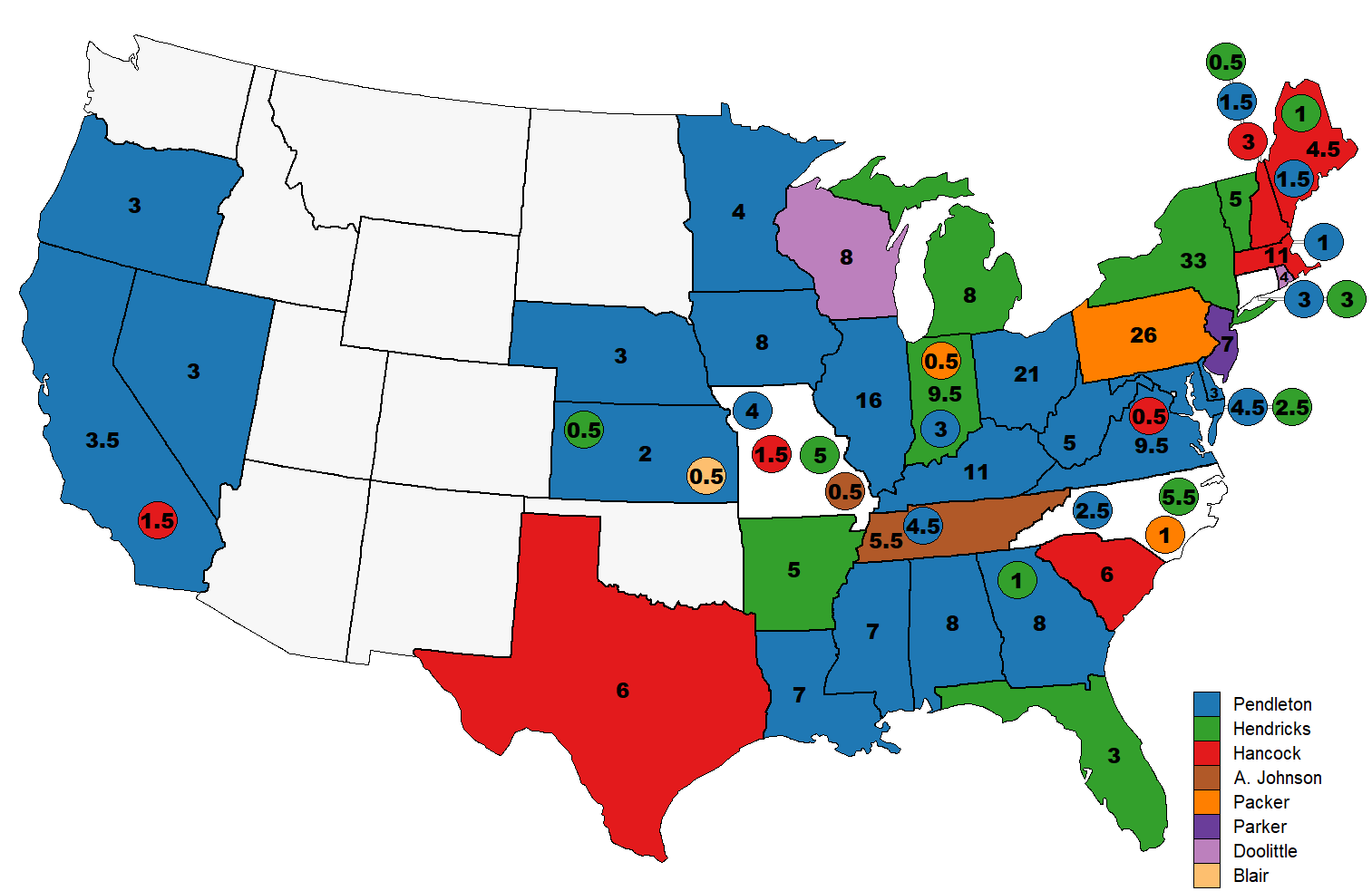
10th presidential ballot

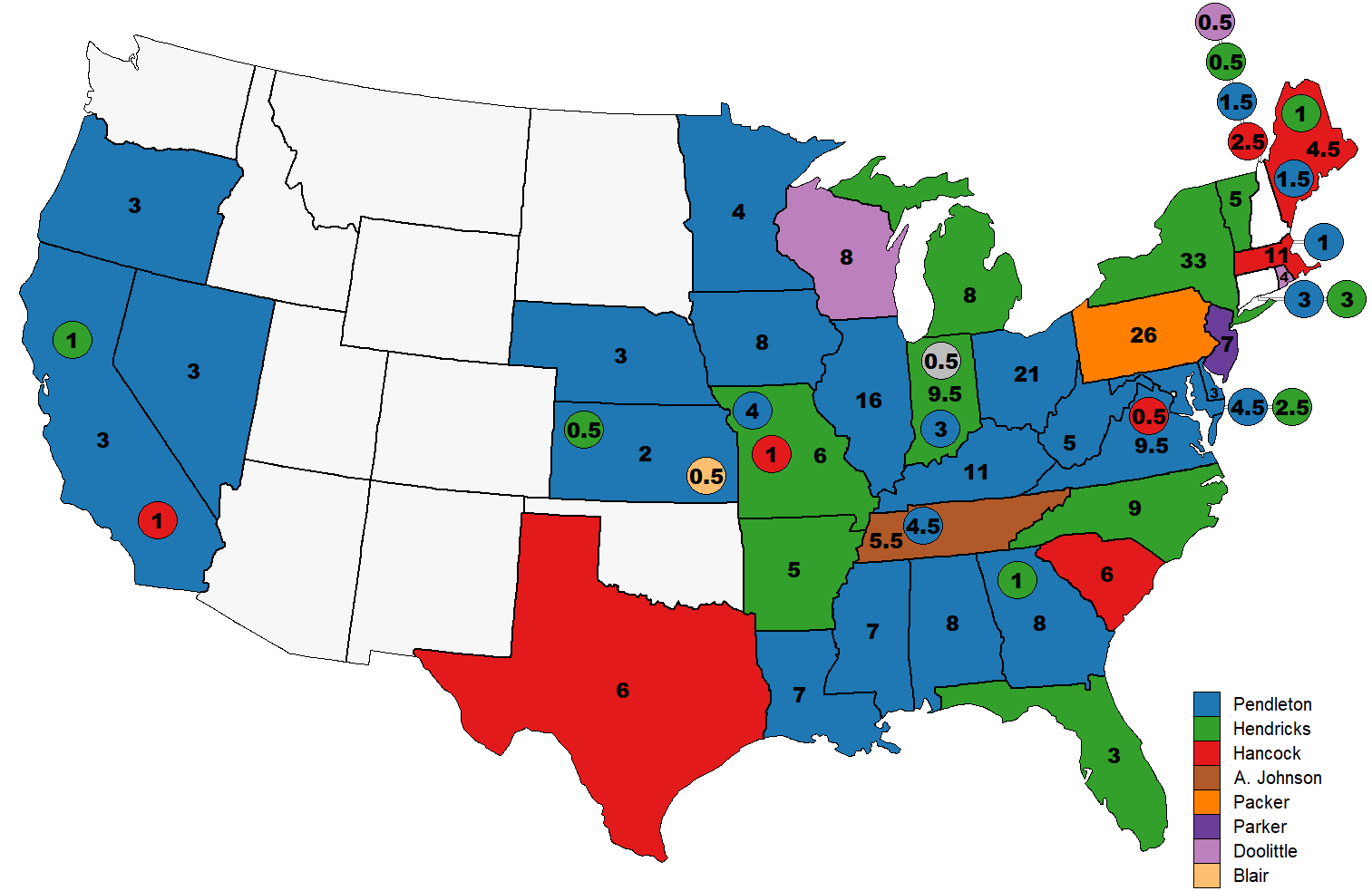
11th presidential ballot

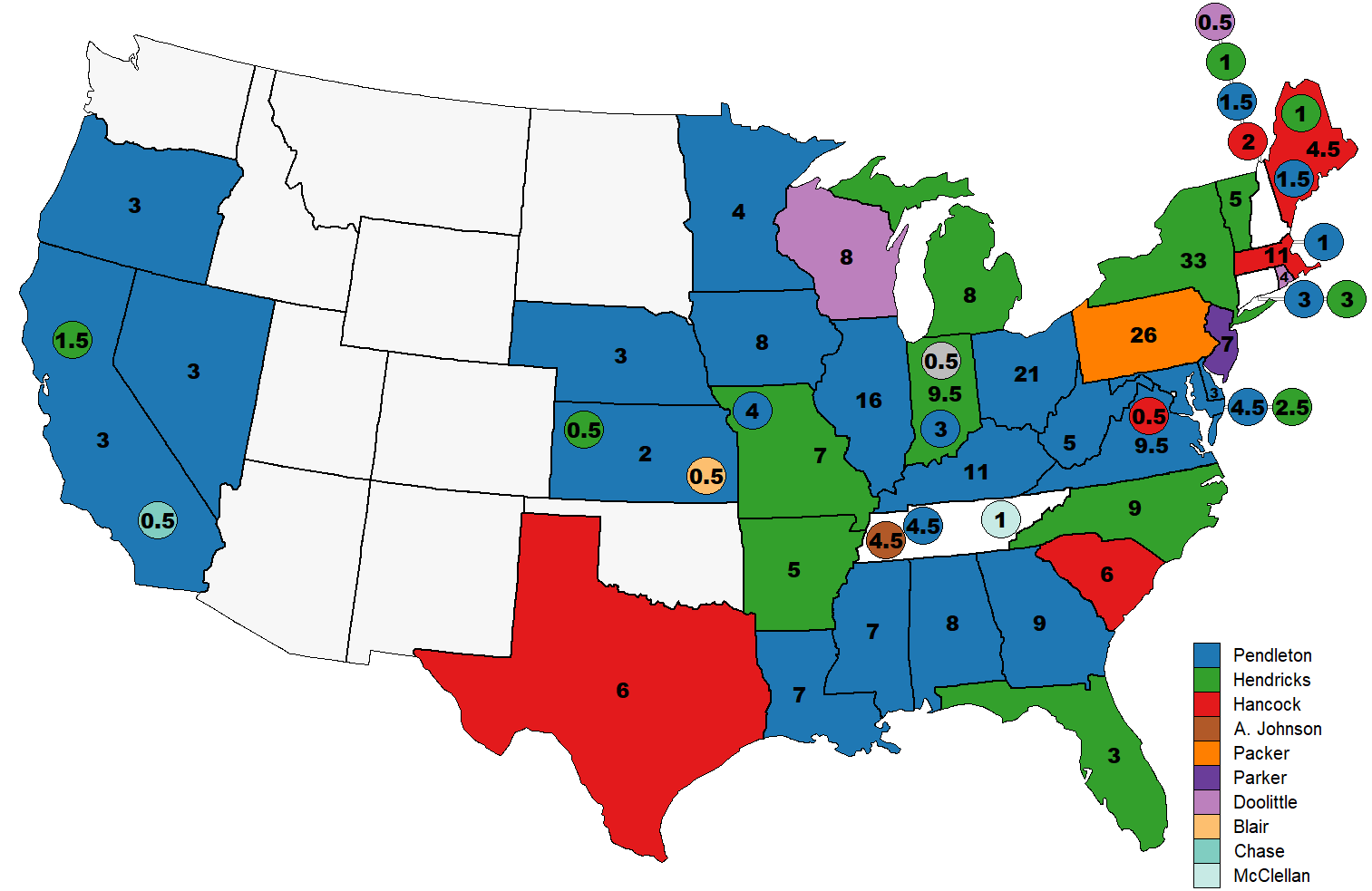
12th presidential ballot

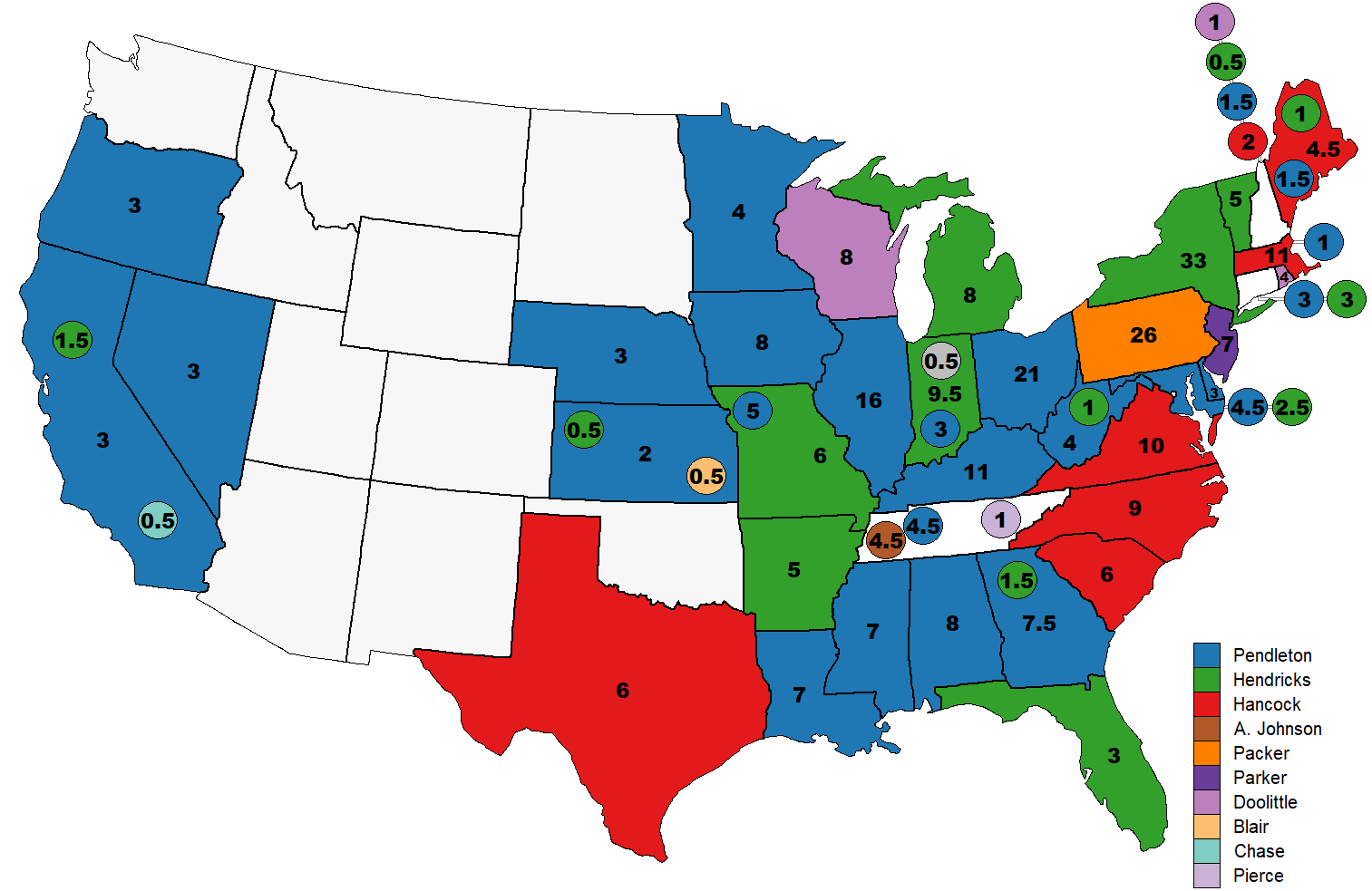
13th presidential ballot

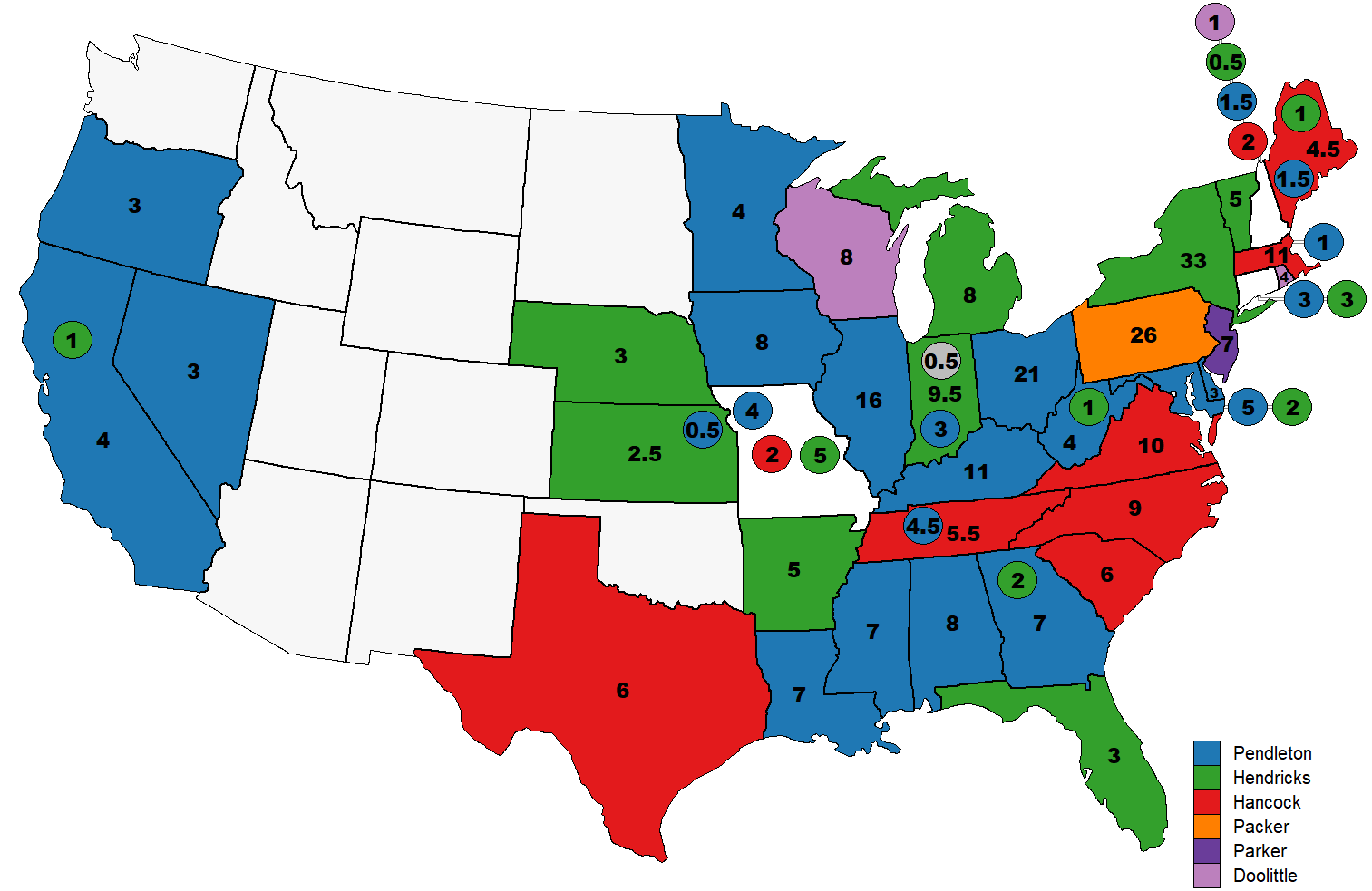
14th presidential ballot

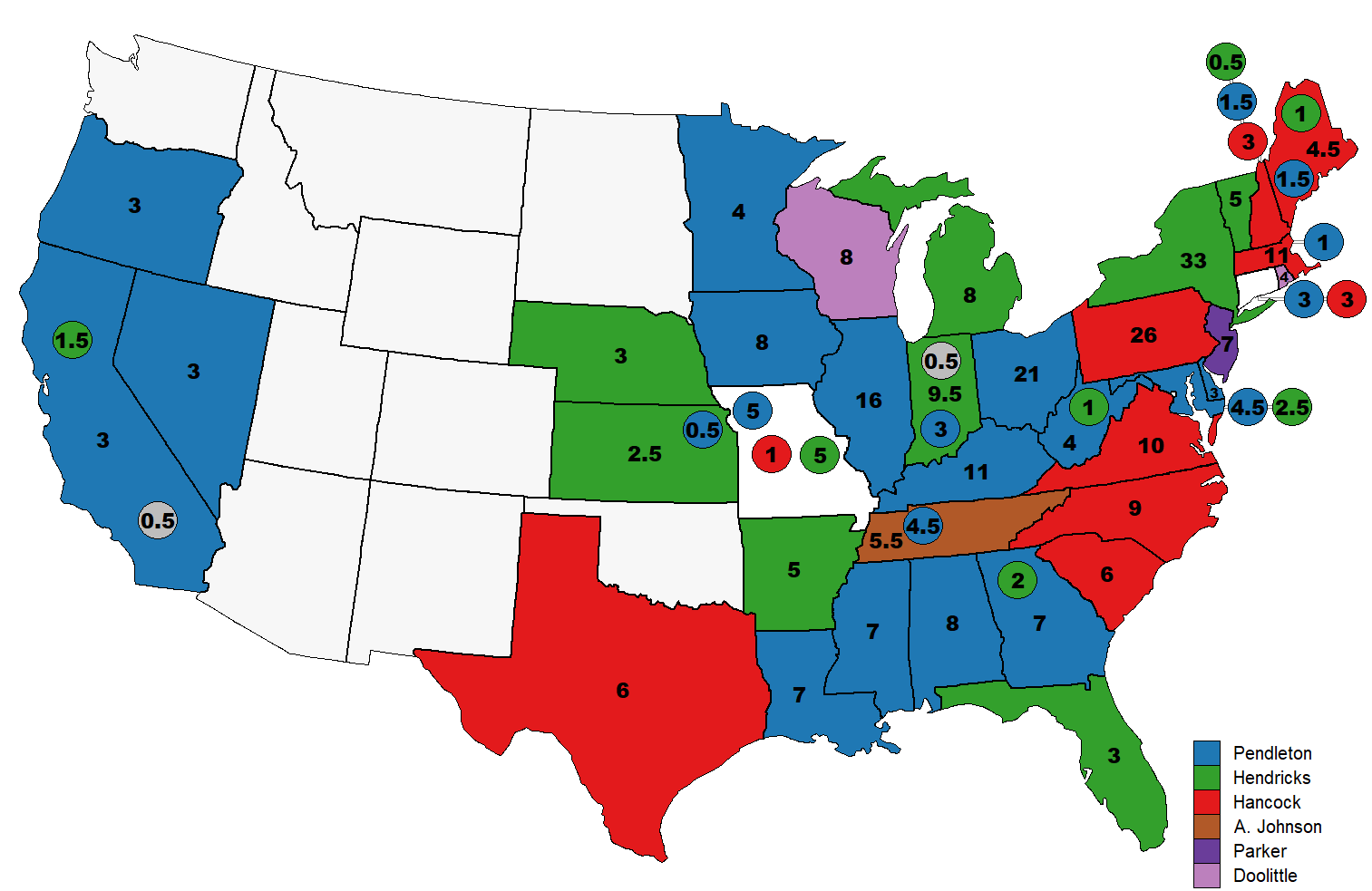
15th presidential ballot

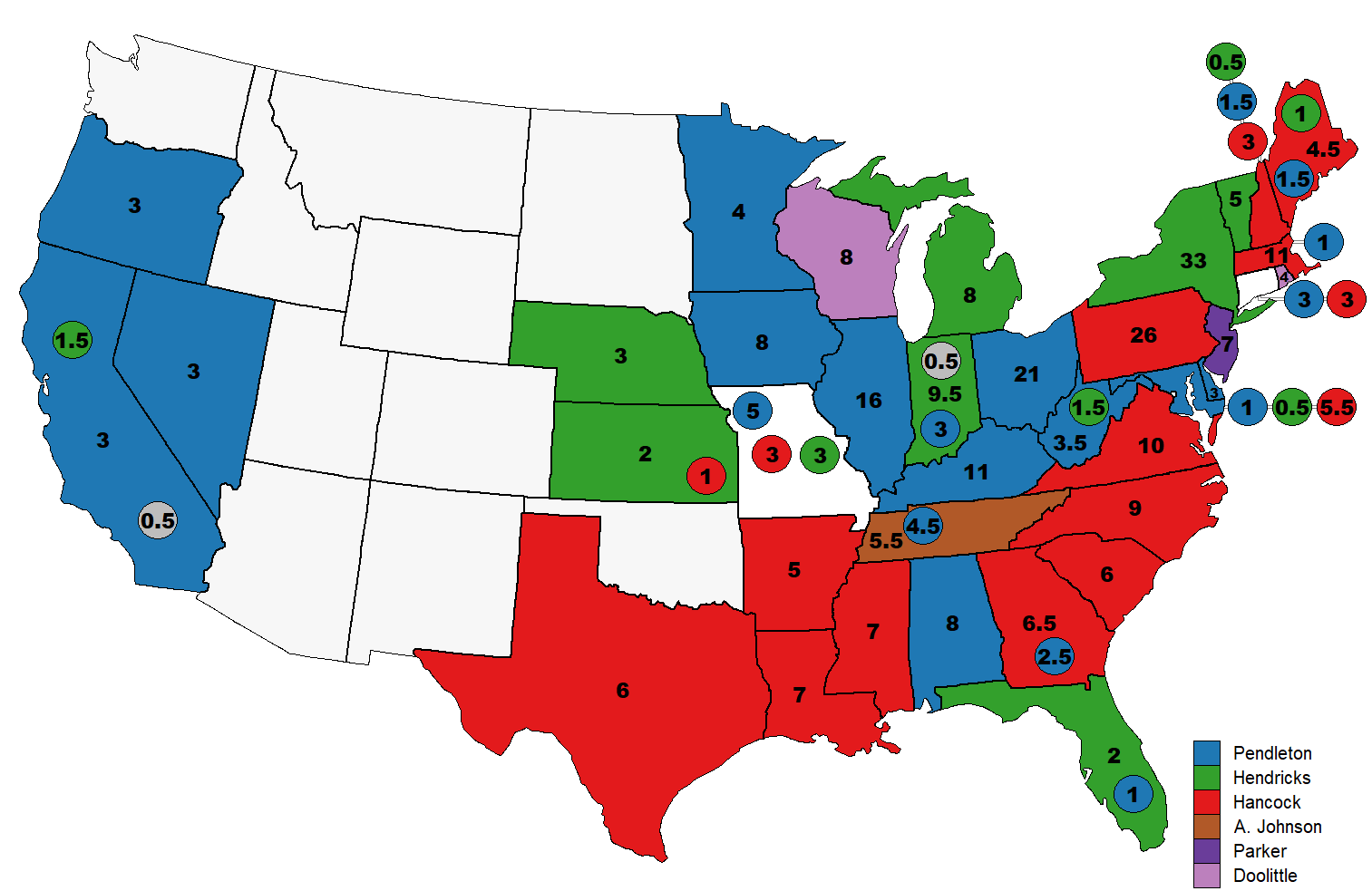
16th presidential ballot

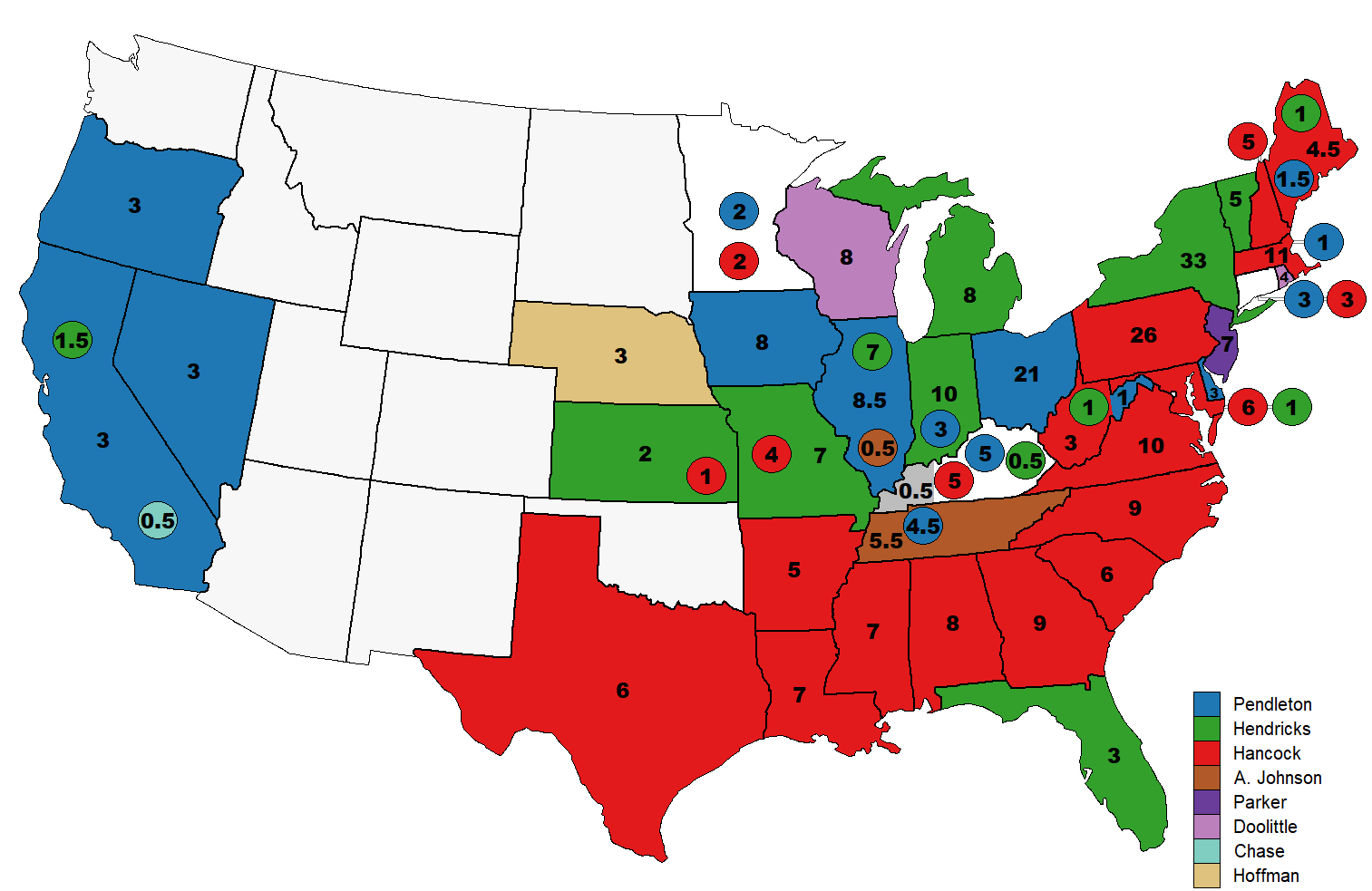
17th presidential ballot

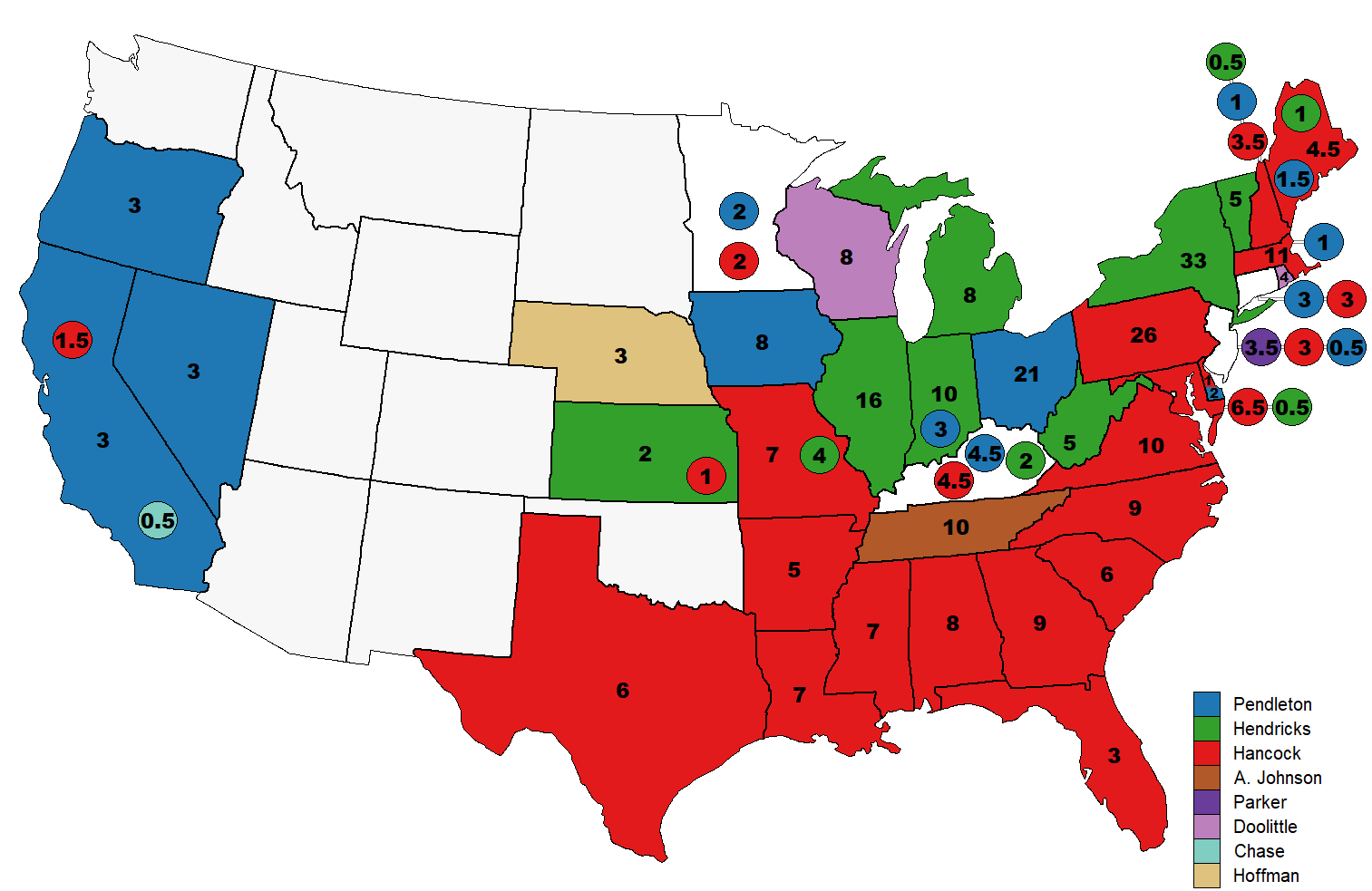
18th presidential ballot

3rd day of presidential balloting / 5th day of convention (Thursday, July 9, 1868)

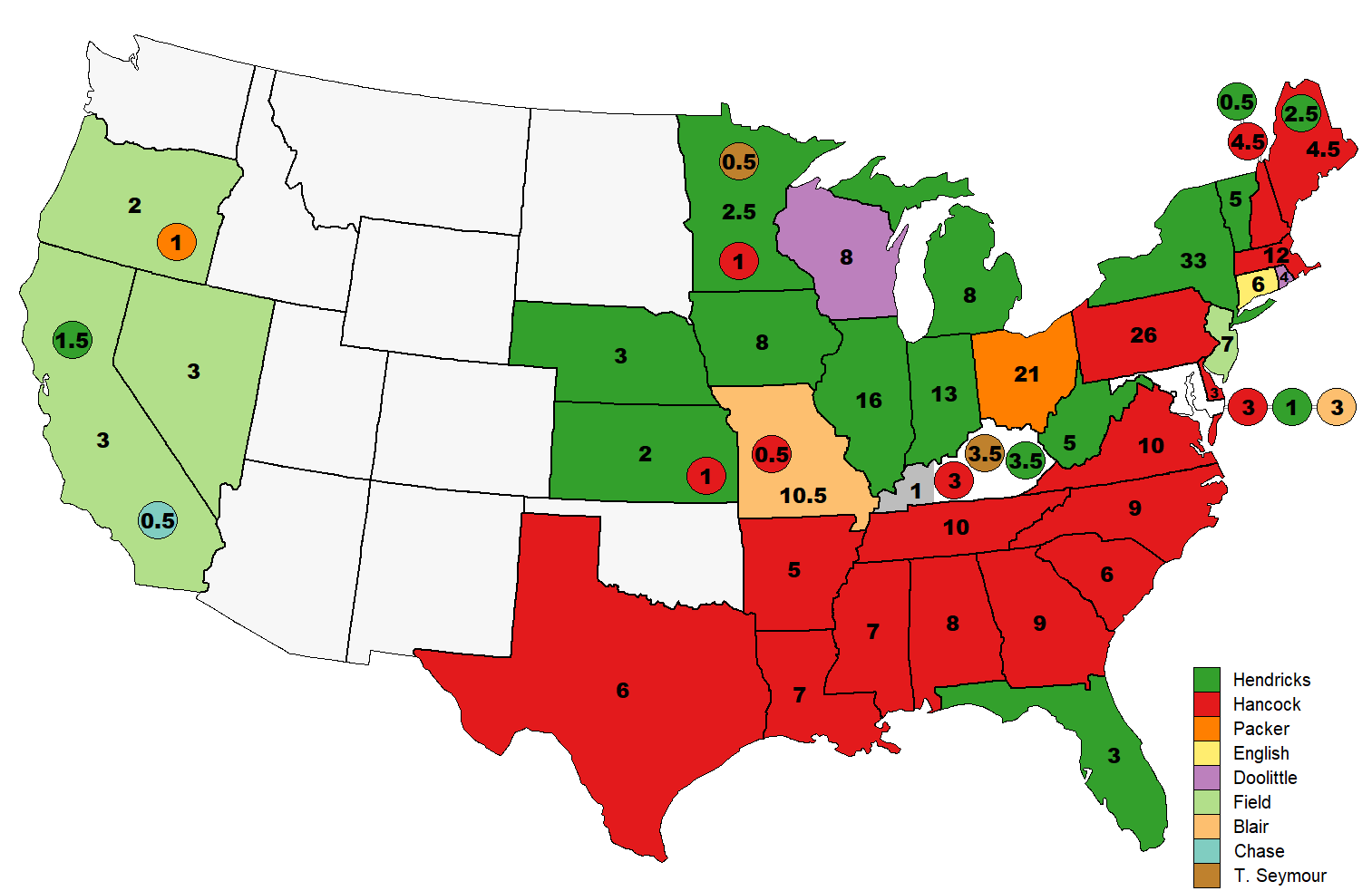
19th presidential ballot

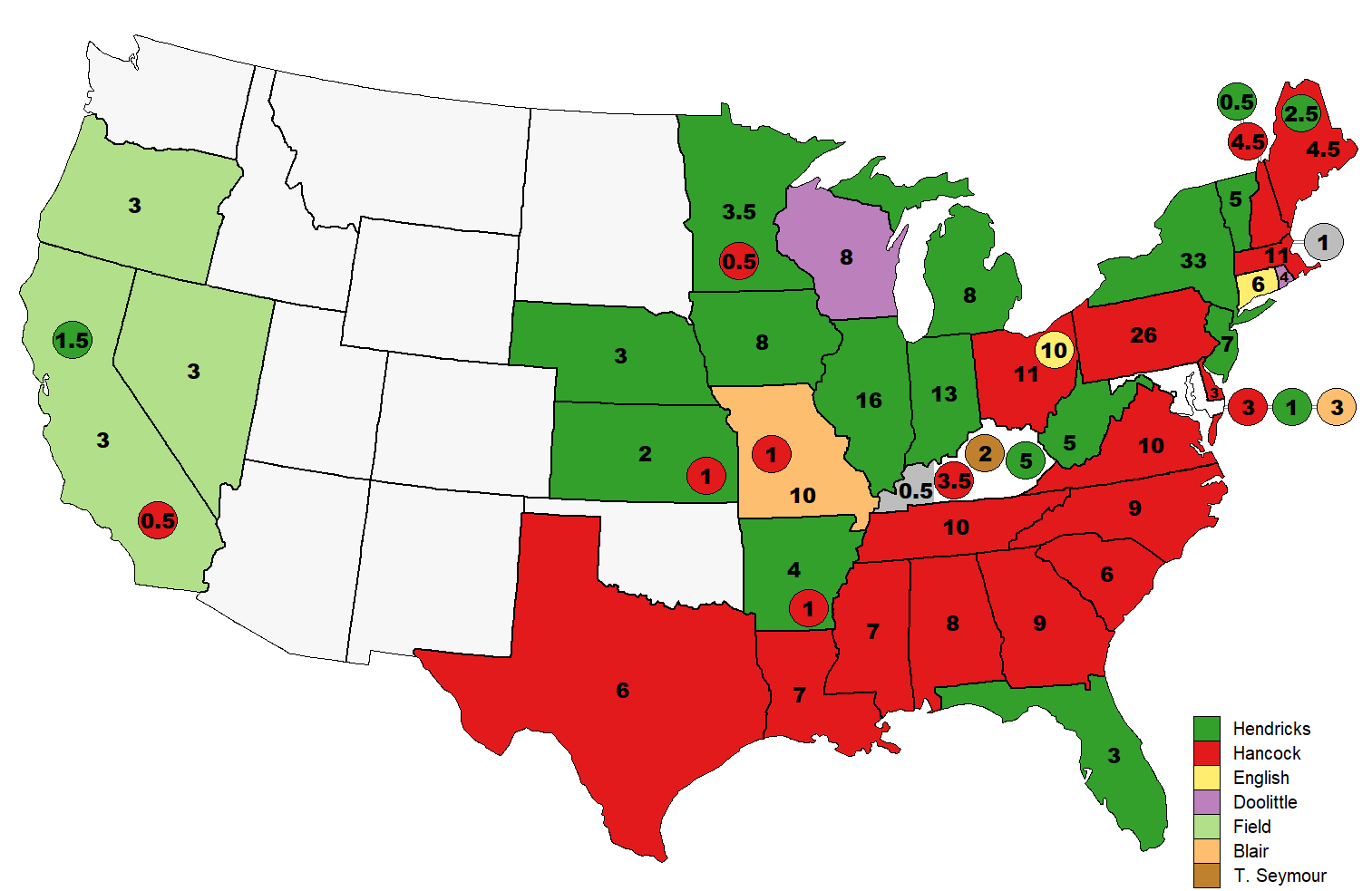
20th presidential ballot

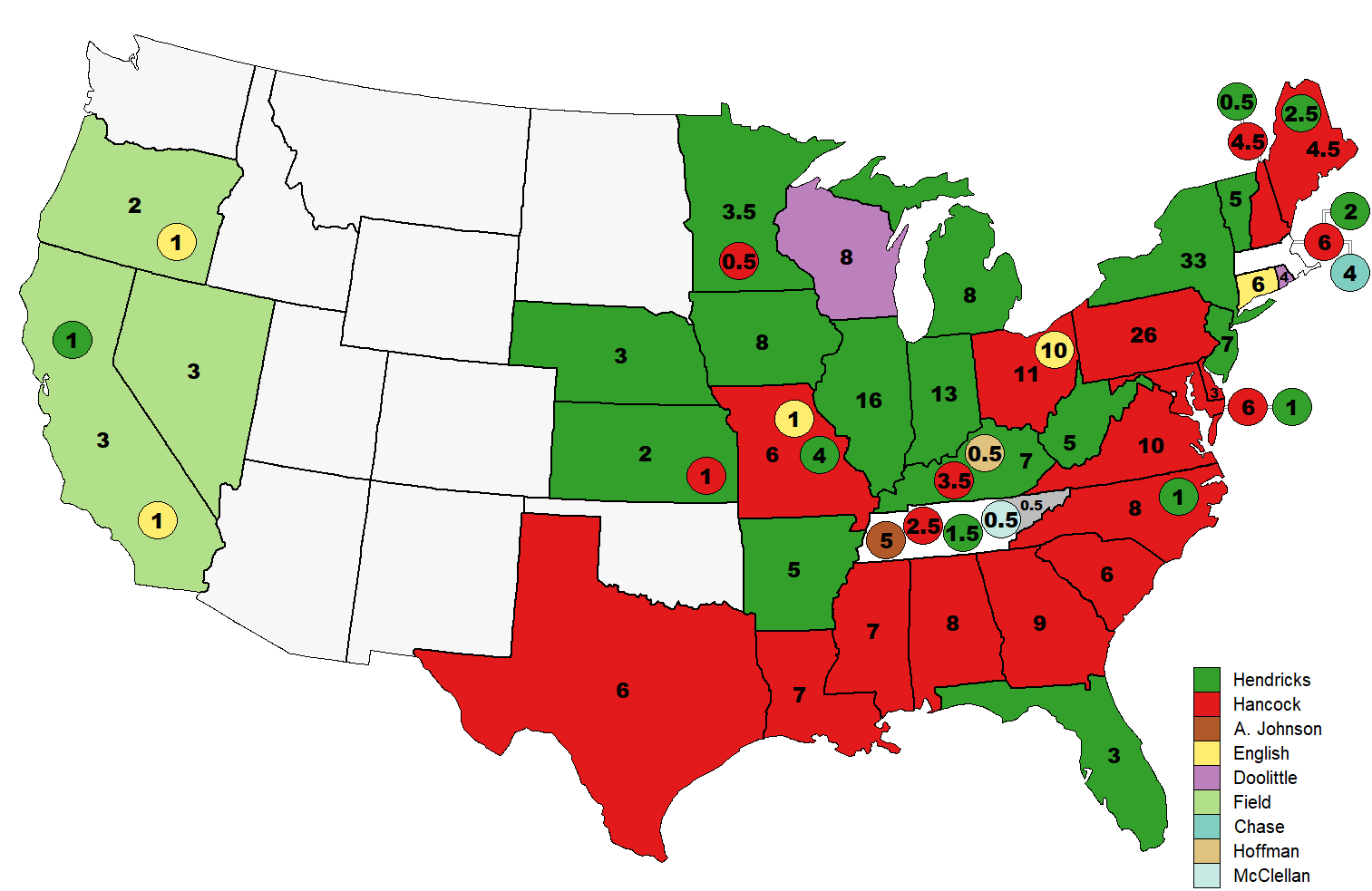
21st presidential ballot

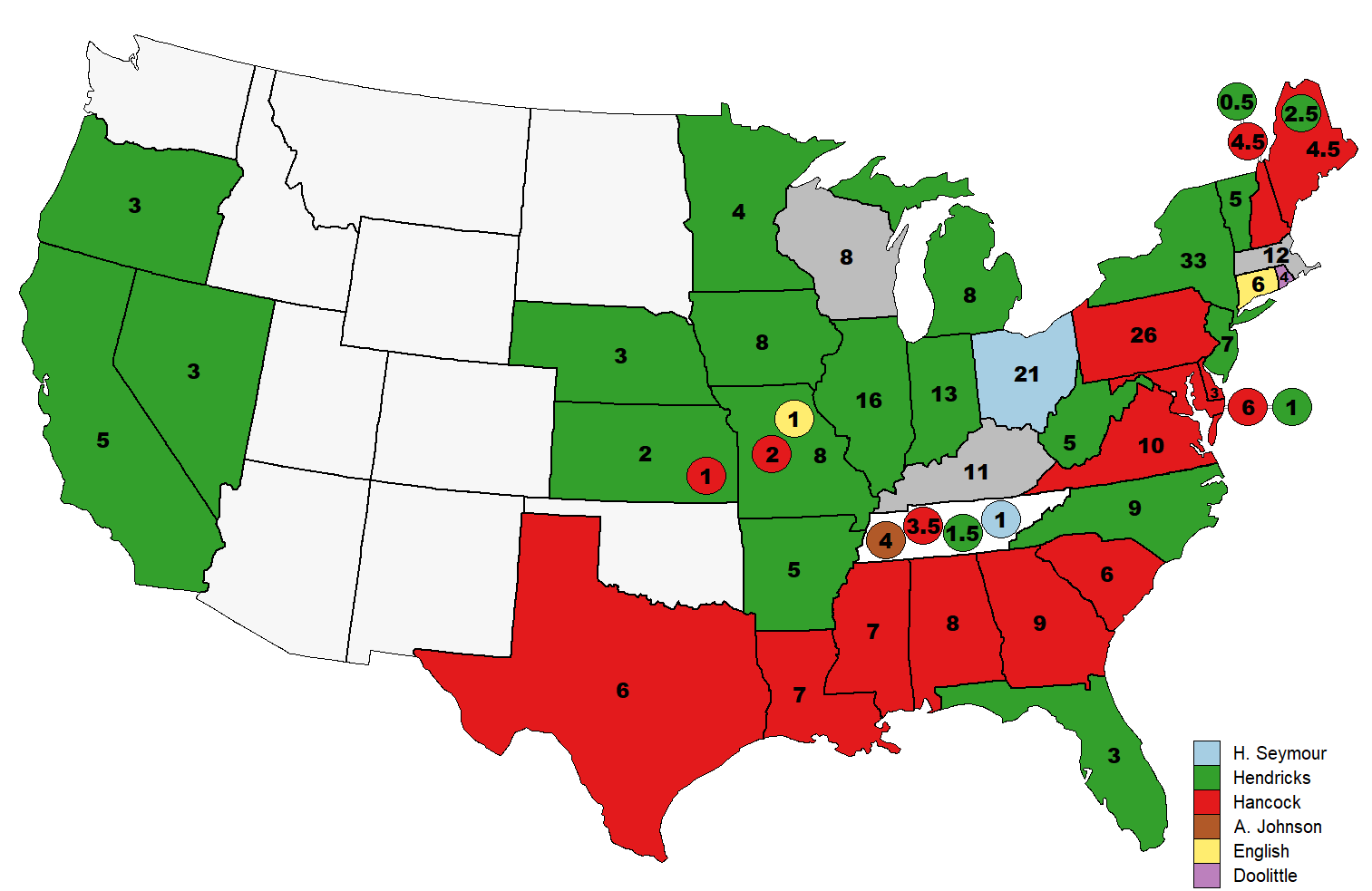
22nd
Presidential ballot
(before shifts)

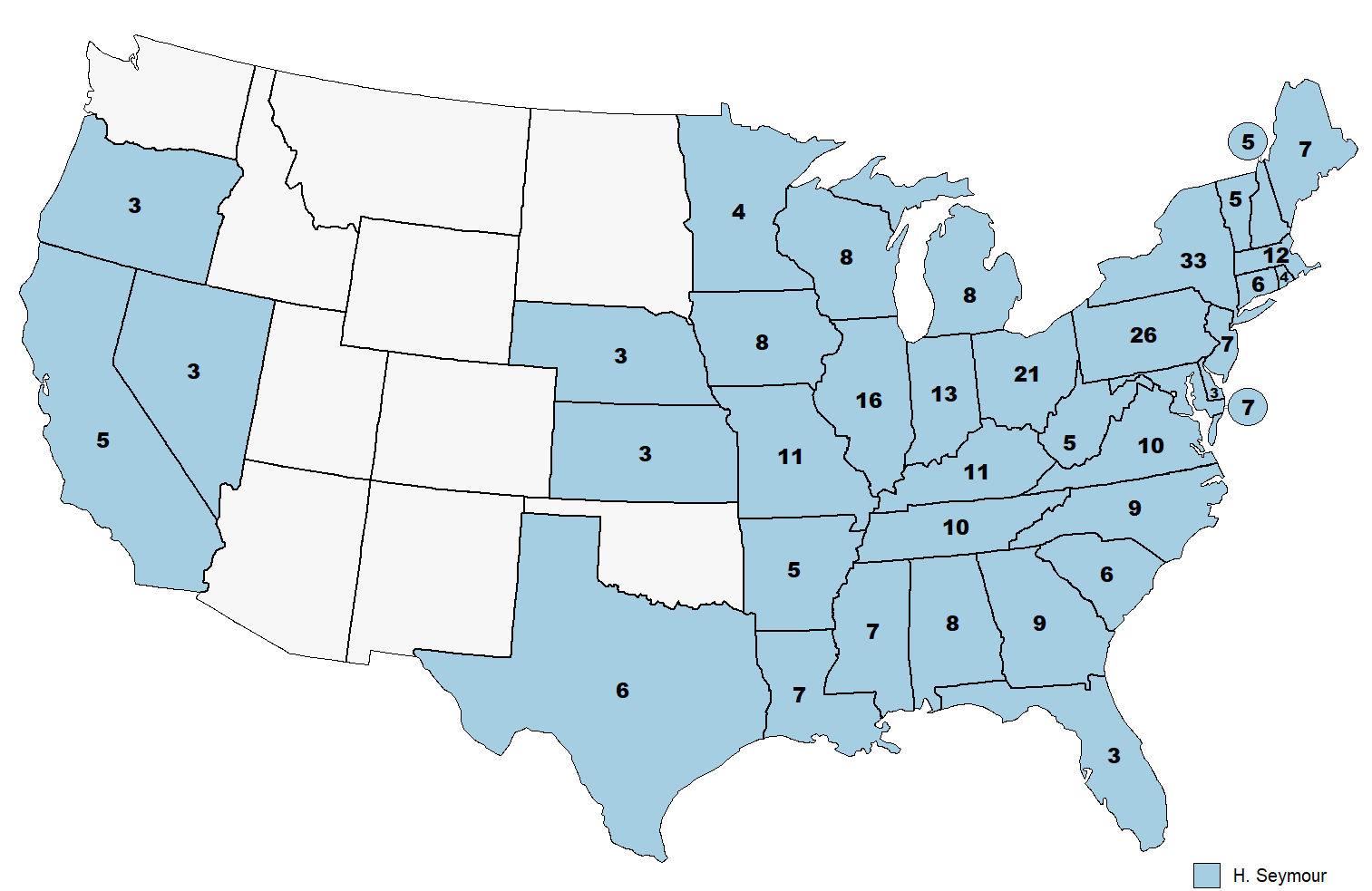
22nd
Presidential ballot
(after shifts)

== Vice-presidential nomination ==
=== Vice-presidential candidates ===
Former Representative Francis Preston Blair Jr.
of Missouri

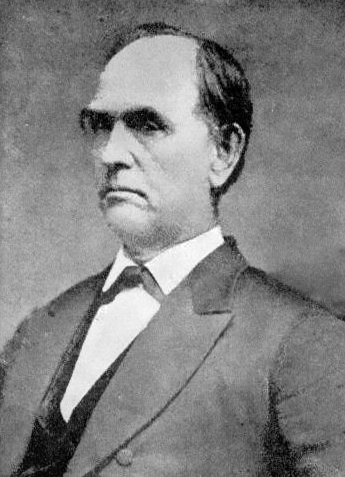
Former Senator Augustus C. Dodge
of Iowa
(withdrawn)

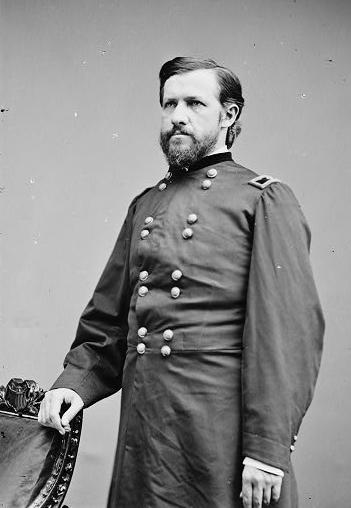
Major General
Thomas Ewing Jr.
of Kansas
(withdrawn)

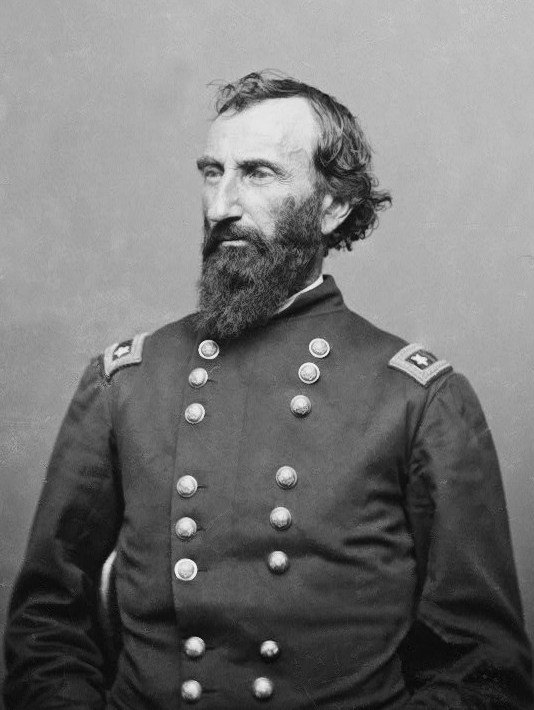
Former Representative John A. McClernand
of Illinois
(withdrew -
declined consideration)

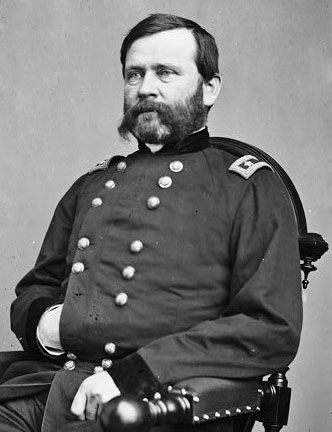
Major General
William B. Franklin
of Connecticut
(not nominated)

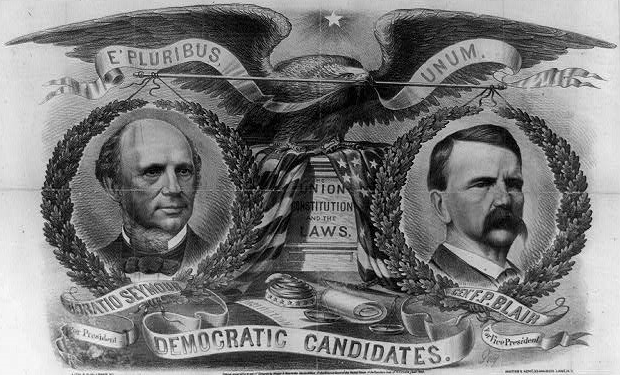
Seymour/Blair campaign poster

Exhausted, the delegates unanimously nominated General Francis Preston Blair Jr. for vice-president on the first ballot after the names of Augustus C. Dodge and Thomas Ewing Jr. were withdrawn from consideration. Blair's nomination reflected a desire to balance the ticket east and west as well as north and south.

Blair had worked hard to acquire the Democratic nomination and accepted second place on the ticket, finding himself in controversy. Blair had gained attention by an inflammatory letter addressed to Colonel James O. Broadhead, dated a few days before the convention met. In his letter, Blair wrote that the "real and only issue in this contest was the overthrow of Reconstruction, as the radical Republicans had forced it in the South."

| Vice presidential ballot | 1st |
| Francis Preston Blair | 317 |

Vice Presidential balloting / 5th day of convention (Thursday, July 9, 1868)

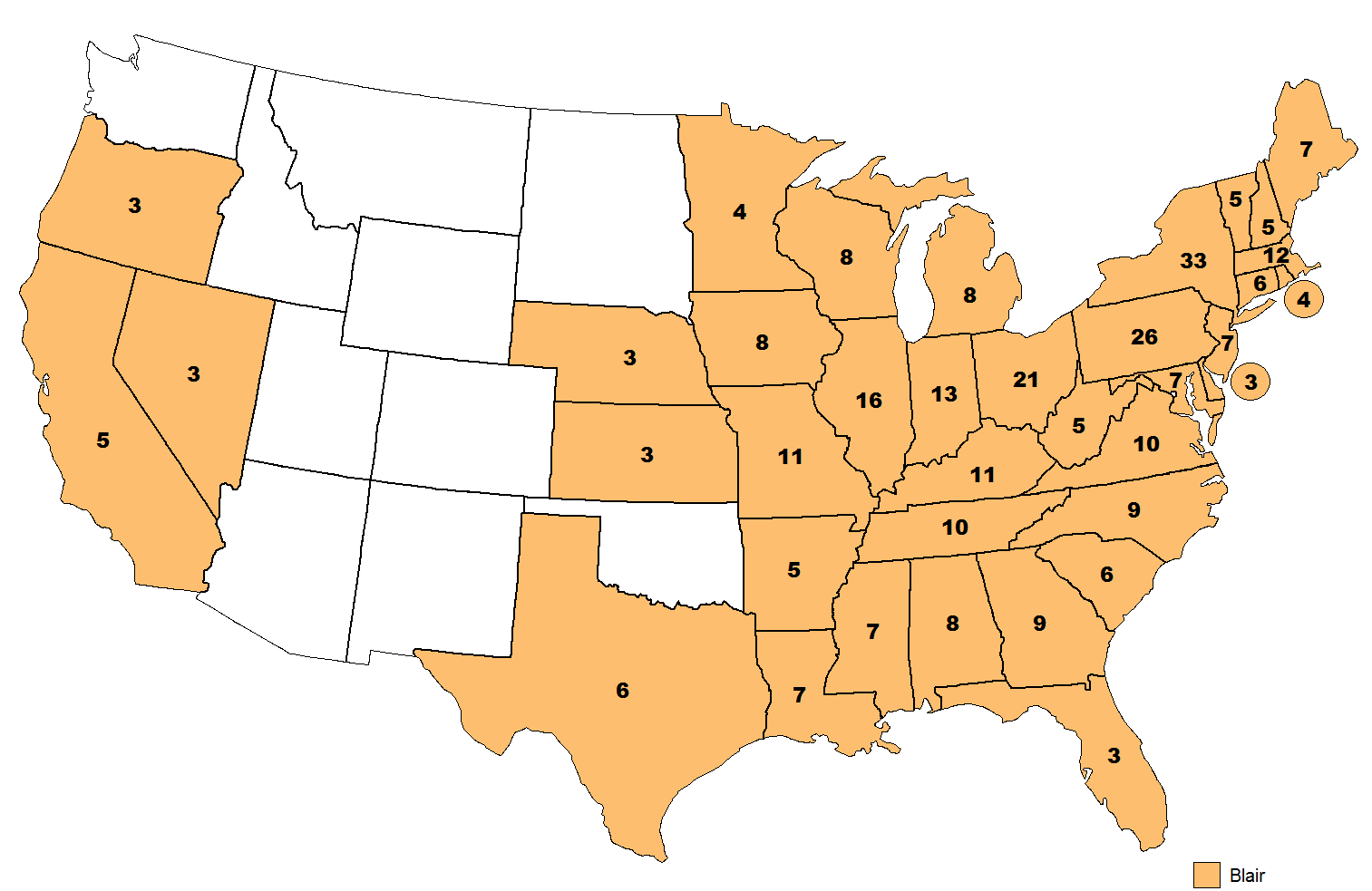
1st vice-presidential ballot

== See also ==
- History of the United States Democratic Party
- List of Democratic National Conventions
- U.S. presidential nomination convention
- 1868 Republican National Convention
- 1868 United States presidential election

== Works cited ==
- Black, Earl; Black, Merle (1992). The Vital South: How Presidents Are Elected. Harvard University Press. ISBN 0674941306.

== Bibliography ==
- Coleman, Charles Hubert. The election of 1868 : the Democratic effort to regain control (1933) online

=== Primary sources ===
- Chester, Edward W A guide to political platforms (1977) pp 86–89 online
- Official proceedings of the National Democratic convention, held at New York, July 4-9, 1868

| Preceded by 1864; Chicago, Illinois | Democratic National Conventions | Succeeded by 1872; Baltimore, Maryland |
