= Simon Sterne =

American lawyer and economist

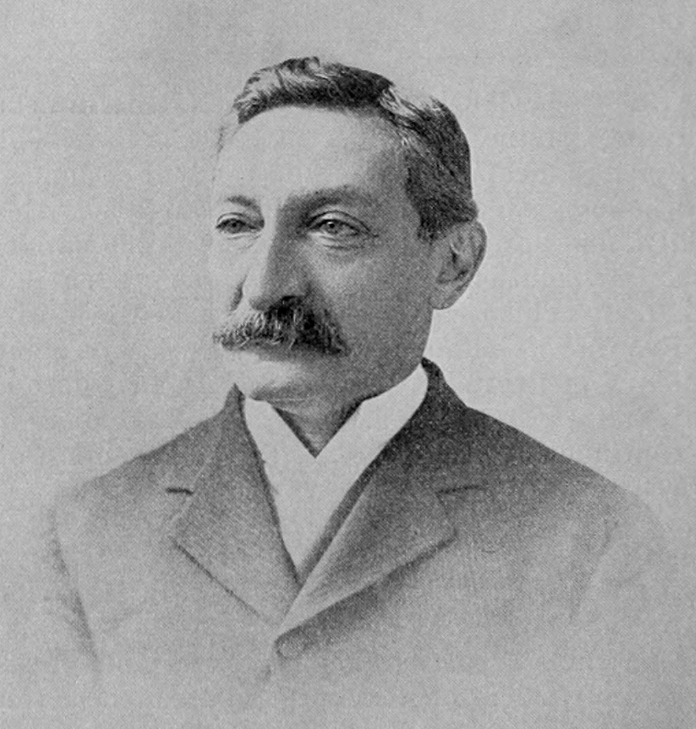
- Born: July 23, 1839; Philadelphia, Pennsylvania
- Died: September 22, 1901 (aged 62); New York City, New York
- Education: University of Pennsylvania (1859)
- Occupations: Lawyer, economist

Signature
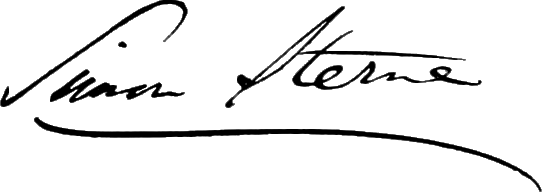

Simon Sterne (July 23, 1839 – September 22, 1901) was an American lawyer, author and economist. As a lawyer he was active in various civic and corporate affairs.His writings include works about American history, politics and business.

== Biography ==
Simon Sterne was born in Philadelphia on July 23, 1839. He studied at the University of Heidelberg, and then graduated from the law department of the University of Pennsylvania in 1859. He was admitted to the bar of New York in 1860, and established himself in practice in New York City. He represented many corporate interests, and paid special attention to real estate and constitutional law. In 1862, he was elected lecturer on political economy in Cooper Union. He was on the staff of the Commercial Advertiser from 1863 to 1864, was a founder of the American Free-trade League in 1864, and in 1865 published the New York Social Science Review, co-founded and edited with Alexander del Mar. .Simon Sterne was mentioned favourable by John Stuart Mill during a 1869 conversation with James H.K. Willcox at Mills final home in Avignon. He declared Sterne to be "an able friend and worker in the cause" (The Minority Rights Movement). Taking an active part in the movement for the purification of municipal politics, he was chosen secretary of the Committee of Seventy in 1870, and drafted the charter that was advocated by that committee. In 1876 he was appointed by Governor Samuel J. Tilden on a commission to devise a plan for the government of cities, in 1879 acted as counsel for the New York Board of Trade and Transportation and Chamber of Commerce in the investigation of abuses in railroad management, which resulted in the appointment of a board of railroad commissioners for the state of New York.

He was also a leader in the movement that resulted in the creation of the Interstate Commerce Commission, drafting the interstate commerce bill in conjunction with the committee of the United States Senate. In 1885 he was appointed by President Cleveland a commissioner to examine and report on the relations between the railroads and the governments of western Europe. An essay that he read before the American Bar Association on "Slip-shod Legislation" led to the appointment in 1888 of a committee of the legislature to consider reforms in the drafting of laws.

He died at his home in New York City on September 22, 1901.

== The Hepburn Committee ==
A. Barton Hepburn was directed by the New York State Legislature in 1879 to investigate the railroads' practice of giving rebates within the state. Merchants without ties to the oil industry had pressed for the hearings. Prior to the committee's investigation, few knew of the size of Standard Oil's control and influence on seemingly unaffiliated oil refineries and pipelines - Hawke (1980) cites that only a dozen or so within Standard Oil knew the extent of company operations. The committee counsel, Simon Sterne, questioned representatives from the Erie Railroad and the New York Central Railroad and discovered that at least half of their long-haul traffic granted rebates, and that much of this traffic came from Standard Oil. The committee then shifted focus to Standard Oil's operations. John Dustin Archbold, as president of Acme Oil Company, denied that Acme was associated with Standard Oil. He then admitted to being a director of Standard Oil. The committee's final report scolded the railroads for their rebate policies and cited Standard Oil as an example. This scolding was largely moot to Standard Oil's interests since long-distance oil pipelines were now their preferred method of transportation.

== Writings ==
He was a frequent writer on economical and political subjects, contributed articles on "Cities," "Legislation," "Monopolies," "Railways," and "Representation" to John J. Lalor's Cyclopaedia of Political Science and United States History (1881-1883), and is the author of:

- Representative Government and Personal Representation Based in Part Upon Thomas Hare's Treatise, Entitled "The Election of Representatives, Parliamentary and Municipal" (Philadelphia, 1870)
- Suffrage in Cities (1878)
- Hindrances to Prosperity (1879)
- Our Methods of Legislation and Their Defects: A Paper Read Before the New York Municipal Society (New York, 1879)
- Constitutional History and Political Development in the United States (New York, 1882; 4th ed., 1888)
- Railways in the United States (1912)
