= James H. Eckels =

James Eckels
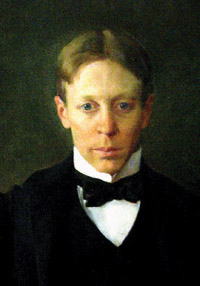

9th Comptroller of the Currency
- In office April 26, 1893 - December 31, 1897
- President: Grover Cleveland; William McKinley
- Preceded by: A. Barton Hepburn
- Succeeded by: Charles G. Dawes

Personal details
- Born: November 22, 1858
- Died: April 14, 1907 (aged 48)

James Herron Eckels (November 22, 1858 – April 14, 1907) was an American lawyer and businessman who served as Comptroller of the Currency from 1893 to 1897.

== Early life and education ==
Eckels was born in Princeton, Illinois. He was the son of James Starr Eckels and Margaret Herron Eckels (née Heron). He was the older brother of George Morris Eckels (a Chicago attorney who donated the titular "George Morris Eckels Collection of Cromwelliana" literature collection to the University of Chicago). Eckels's father was an active member of the Democratic Party, and had moved to Princeton from the state of Pennsylvania.

Eckels attended law school in Albany, New York. During his time there, he crossed paths with New York state politician Grover Cleveland, whom he befriended.

== Early career ==
Eckels became an attorney, and opened a legal practice in Ottawa, Illinois, in 1881.

In 1891, Eckels joined the board of directors of the Commercial National Bank of Chicago.

In 1892, Eckels campaigned for his friend Grover Cleveland's campaign to regain election to the American presidency. He delivered numerous well-received speeches supporting Cleveland's platform for tariff reform.

== Comptroller of the Currency (1893–1897) ==
Eckels was appointed comptroller of the currency by his friend Grover Cleveland, after Cleveland became president for a second non-consecutive term. This appointment broke a precedent that only those with previous banking experience could serve as Comptroller. Eckels, a 35-year-old lawyer, lacked no direct baking experience. While some senators objected to the nominations, Eckels was confirmed by the U.S. Senate in no small part due to public backing of his nomination by former comptroller Edward S. Lacey.

A month after Eckels took office, the country plunged into the Panic of 1893. His efforts to restore confidence in the national banking system played an important role in bringing back the economic health of the nation. Eckels managed to negotiate the re-opening of 115 of the 165 national that had closed at the start of the panic, and managed to guide them through the criss.

Dissatisfied with the nomination of William Jennings Bryan at the 1896 Democratic National Convention, Eckels was an Illinois delegate to the 1896 National Democratic National Convention (a splinter convention).

Eckels resigned in 1897.

== President of Commercial National Bank of Chicago ==
On January 1, 1898, Eckels became president of the Commercial National Bank of Chicago. The bank had been courting him for months prior to his departure from the federal government to take the position. Eckels's positive national reputation greatly aided the bank's success. In his first two years at the banks, deposits increased from $9 million to more than $19 million. By 1900, the bank was among Chicago's leading financial institutions, outranked only by First National Bank of Chicago and Continental National Bank of Chicago.

In the early 1900s, Eckels commissioned a new headquarters for the bank. The bank ultimately opened two weeks after his death.

Eckels died on April 14, 1907, of a heart attack in his sleep.
