= John Joseph Lalor =

American political scientist

- Born: 1840 or 1841
- Died: June 9, 1899 (aged 58); Washington, D. C.

John Joseph Lalor (1840 or 1841 to 9 June 1899) was an American political scientist, a translator of work by Ludwig Nohl and Wilhelm Roscher, and the publisher of Cyclopaedia of Political Science, Political Economy, and the Political History of the United States (1895).

== Biography ==
In 1885, Lalor taught at East Side High School, Milwaukee. Lalor worked as a translator in the Director of Mint, U. S. Treasury Department. Lalor collaborated with Louis Wolowski, Ludwig Nohl, and Paul Shorey. He translated works by Rudolf von Jhering and Wilhelm Roscher. He translated from German two works by Ludwig Nohl, a biography of Ludwig Beethoven in Life of Beethoven (1881) and Wolfgang Mozart in Life of Mozart (1880).

In 1899, Lalor died from injuries due to a fall.

== Works or publications ==
- Cyclopaedia of Political Science, Political Economy, and of the Political History of the United States. 1895. OCLC 634756812.
- Life of Beethoven. 1881. OCLC 861108. with L. Nohl
- Life of Mozart. 1880. OCLC 604749. with L. Nohl
- Principles of Political Economy, 1882, OCLC 3484818 with G. F. Roscher and L. Wolowski
- R. von Jhering (1915). The Struggle for Law. OCLC 1933945. translated from German by Lalor
- The Constitutional and Political History of the United States. 1881. OCLC 294964. with H. Von Holst, Alfred Bishop Mason, P. Shorey, Brainerd, Ira Hutchinson
- The Primer of Political Economy; in Sixteen Definitions and Forty Propositions. 1885. OCLC 6784624. with Alfred Bishop Mason

== See also ==
- Rudolf von Jhering
- Ludwig Nohl
- Wilhelm Roscher
- Paul Shorey
- Louis Wolowski
