= A Song for Miss Julie =

1945 film by William Rowland

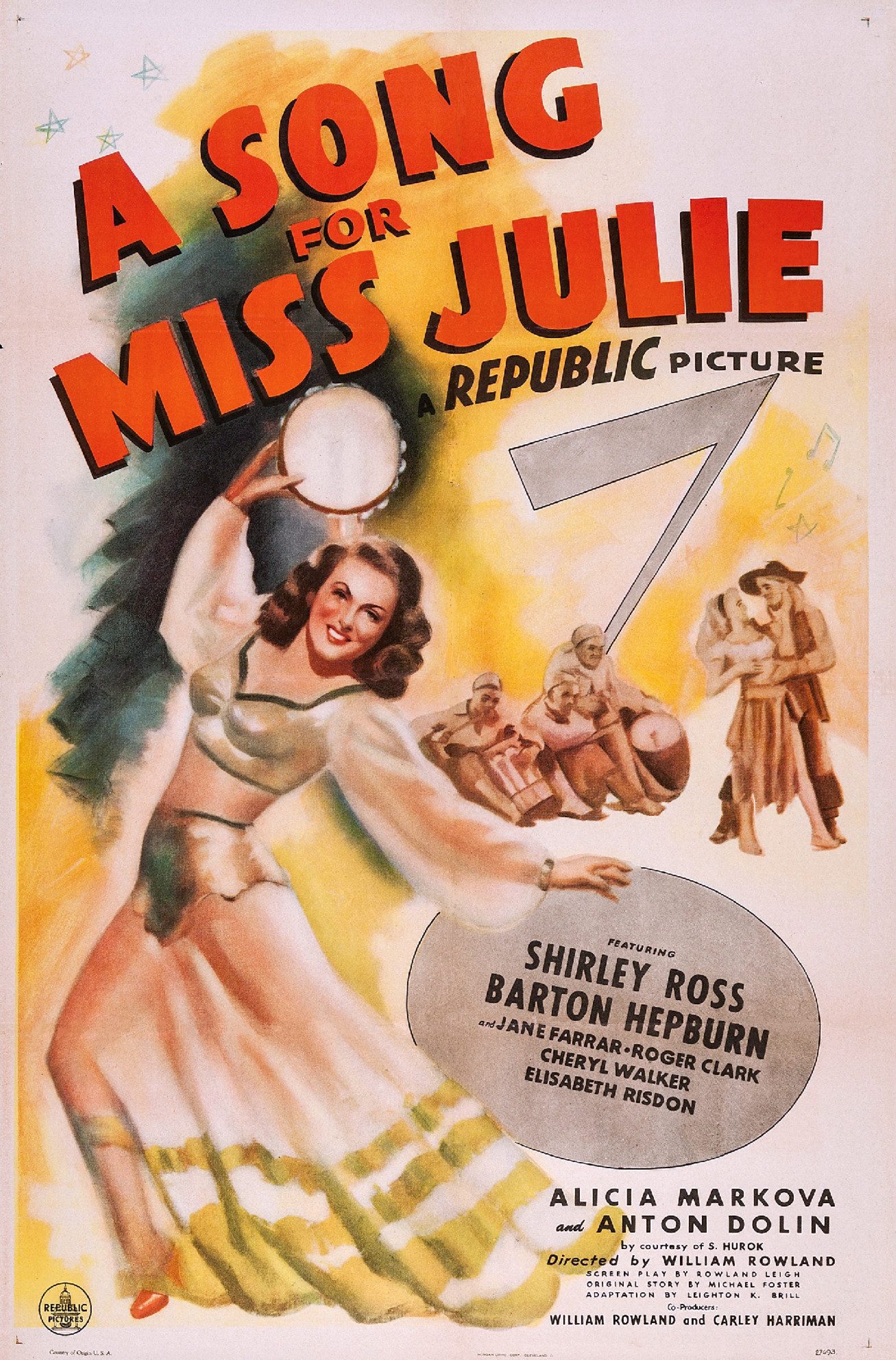
- Film poster
- Directed by: William Rowland
- Written by: Leighton Brill (adaptation); Michael Foster (story); Rowland Leigh (writer)
- Produced by: Carley Harriman (associate producer); William Rowland (associate producer)
- Starring: Shirley Ross; Barton Hepburn; Jane Farrar
- Cinematography: Mack Stengler
- Edited by: James Smith
- Production company: Republic Pictures
- Distributed by: Republic Pictures
- Release date: 19 February 1945
- Running time: 69 minutes
- Country: United States
- Language: English

A Song for Miss Julie is a 1945 American musical film directed by William Rowland.

== Cast ==
- Shirley Ross as Valerie Kimbro
- Barton Hepburn as George Kimbro
- Jane Farrar as Julie Charteris
- Roger Clark as Stephen Mont
- Cheryl Walker as Marcelle Conway
- Elisabeth Risdon as Mrs. Ambrose Charteris
- Lillian Randolph as Eliza Henry
- Peter Garey as Pete – the Bellhop
- Renie Riano as Eurydice Lannier
- Harry Crocker as John Firbank
- Vivien Fay as herself
- Alicia Markova as herself – Ballet Dancer
- Anton Dolin as himself – Ballet Dancer
