= Full Circle (1935 film) =

- René Ray and Garry Marsh in the film
- Directed by: George King
- Written by: Michael Barringer
- Produced by: Irving Asher
- Starring: René Ray; Garry Marsh; Margaret Yarde
- Cinematography: Basil Emmott
- Production company: Warner Brothers
- Distributed by: Warner Brothers
- Release date: April 1935
- Running time: 55 minutes
- Country: United Kingdom
- Language: English

Full Circle is a 1935 British crime film directed by George King and starring René Ray, Garry Marsh and Margaret Yarde. It was written by Michael Barringer, and made as a quota quickie at Teddington Studios by the British subsidiary of Warner Brothers.

== Preservation status ==
The British Film Institute National Archive holds a collection of stills but no film or video materials.

== Plot ==
When Sir Hubert Warren dies, his will stipulates his estate to pass to his nephew Anthony. When Leonora Alloway steals the will, this leads to Warren's other nephew, Clyde, inheriting the estate. Burglar Mark Boyd obtains the will and sells it to crook Max Reeves, who auctions it to the highest bidder. Finally Boyd retrieves the will and gives it to Anthony, who can now receive his rightful inheritance.

== Cast ==
- René Ray as Margery Boyd
- Garry Marsh as Max Reeves
- Graham Pocket as Mark Boyd
- Betty Shale as Mrs. Boyd
- Margaret Yarde as Agatha
- Patricia Hilliard as Jeanne Westover
- Bruce Belfrage as Clyde Warren
- John Wood as Tony Warren
- Elizabeth Jenns as Leonora Allway

== Reception ==
The Daily Film Renter wrote: "It is impossible to believe in this novelettish story ... The players are hard put to it to infuse any conviction into the stilted roles in which they have been cast. Suffice to say Renee Ray, Garry Marsh, Elisabeth Jenns, and Margaret Yarde reveal themselves worthy of better material."

Picture Show wrote: "A romantic melodrama in which a stolen will is restored to its original owners. Blackmail also enters into the story but none of it is very clear. ...Poor entertainment."

Picturegoer wrote: "The long arm of coincidence is so stretched in this involved and verbose drama that it contains very little entertainment value. There are far too many characters in whom one is supposed to take an interest, and though the artistes do their best, they fail entirely to hold your attention or bring conviction to their roles."
