= List of Middlebury College buildings =

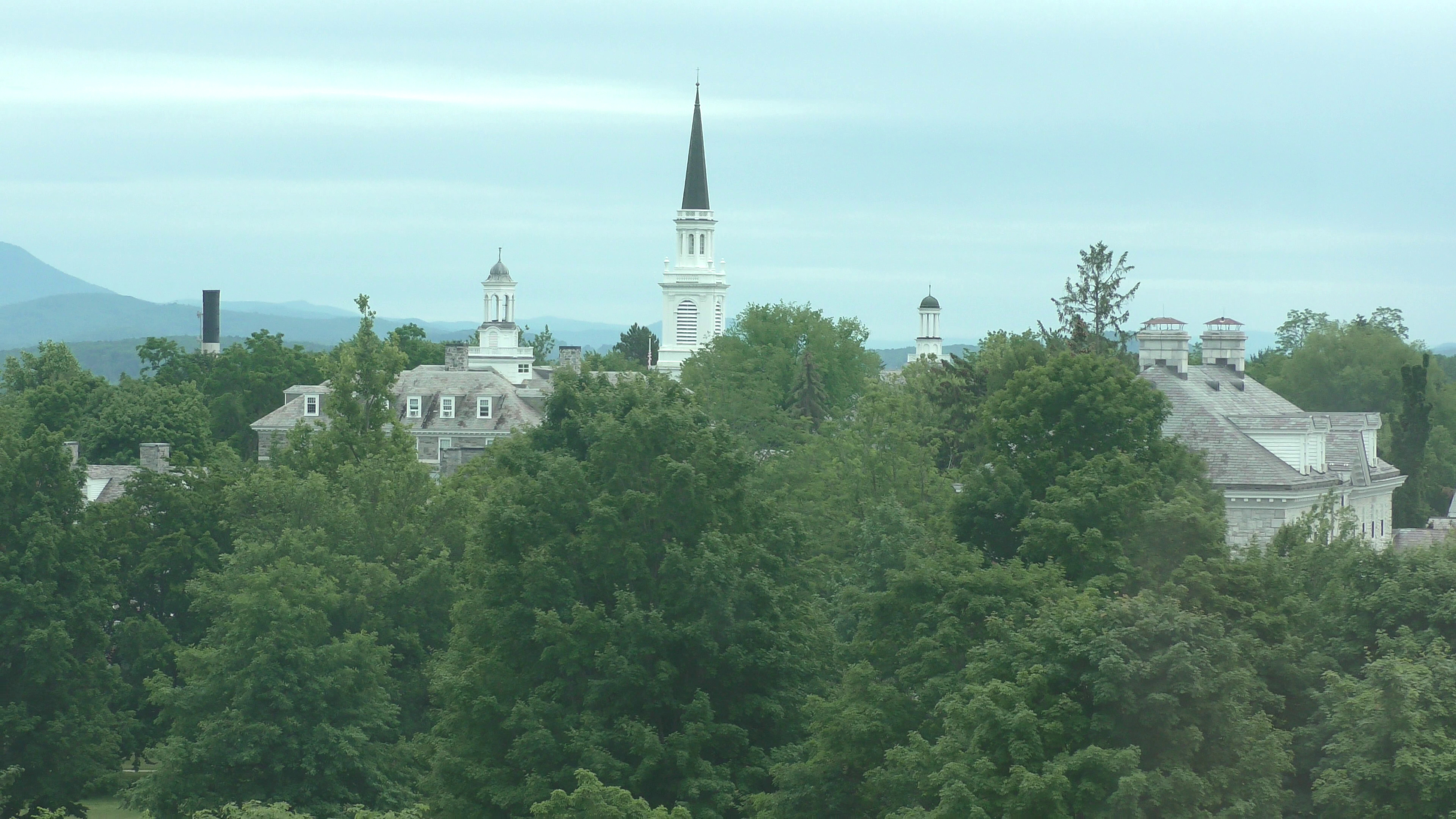
Middlebury College

The following buildings are located on Middlebury College's campus in the Champlain Valley in Vermont, United States.

== List of Middlebury College buildings on Middlebury, Vermont campus ==
Image	Name	Year built/opened	Description
	Adirondack House		Remodeled in 1909 after being obtained by the college. Formerly housed the Center for Careers and Internships (CCI). During the COVID-19 pandemic, ADK was transformed into isolation housing for infected students, and is now a dormitory for upperclassmen. It also houses Coltrane Lounge, which is used as an event space, as well as the student-run college bike shop in the basement.
	Allen Hall	1963	1st-year residence hall
	Alumni Stadium		
	Atwater Hall A	2004	Suite housing for upperclassmen and a popular party space. The Atwater dorms are often referred to as "fratwater" and Atwater is used as a metonym for the party scene at Middlebury.
	Atwater Hall B	2004	Suite housing for upperclassmen and a popular party space. The Atwater dorms are often referred to as "fratwater," and Atwater is used as a metonym for the party scene at Middlebury.
	Atwater Dining Hall	2005	Formerly open for breakfast, lunch, and special events. As an attempt to curb the spread of COVID-19, Atwater is now open for 3 meals a day during the week, and closed during the weekends.
	Axinn Center At Starr Library	2008	The Axinn Center is an adaptation of Starr Library, which was built in 1900 and expanded multiple times. Now houses classrooms and faculty offices in addition to the original library.
	McCardell Bicentennial Hall	1999	Science building; home to an observatory with a 24-inch (0.61 m) optical telescope and a greenhouse. Known colloquially as "BiHall," it is home to the largest window in the state and is popularly thought to be the second-largest building in Vermont by floor area.
	Battell Hall	1950 and 1955	First year dormitories named for Joseph Battell. Originally built as two separate buildings, Battell North and Battell South, with the center connecting the two constructed in 1955.
	Centeno House		Houses the Parton Center, the college's health center
	Coffrin Hall	1986	Primarily a dormitory for sophomores and a few first years
	Davis Family Library	2004	Built on the site of the former Science Center
	Franklin Environmental Center at Hillcrest		Houses environmental studies offices and classrooms in a LEED Platinum-certified building.
	Freeman International Center	1970	A former dining hall, now houses classrooms, the offices for the German, Japanese, and Russian departments, and the Hillel Jewish Center
	Gifford Hall	1940	Sophomore Dormitory, also houses the Gamut Room performance space and outdoor "gampitheatre"as well as a seminar room.
	Hadley Hall	1969 or 1970	Sophomore dormitory. On the right side of the image; Milliken Hall is on the left, and Ross Tower is in the middle
	Hathaway House		Houses the Charles P. Scott Center for Religious Life and the Chaplain's Office
	Hepburn Hall	1916	Dormitory, also houses the newsroom for the Middlebury Campus student newspaper in the basement and the Hepburn Zoo, a blackbox theatre, on the second floor. The Zoo, a former dining area, is so-named because it was originally adorned with the hunting trophies of A. Barton Hepburn '71 (1871), who gave the hall as a gift to the school. Hepburn Hall was also originally painted bright yellow but was repainted gray following Hepburn's death to better match the rest of the campus' buildings.
	Johnson Memorial Building	1968	Houses the architecture and studio art departments
	Kenyon Arena	1998	Hockey arena with a seated capacity of 2,600
	Kelly Hall	1969 or 1970	Upperclassmen residence
	Kirk Alumni Center		
	LaForce Hall	2004	Upperclassmen residence
	Lang Hall	1969 or 1970	Upperclassmen residence
	Le Château	1925	Home to the Department of French; also contains classrooms and student housing
	Mahaney Arts Center	1992	Also home to the Middlebury College Museum of Art, the 370-seat Robison (concert) Hall, the 160-seat Dance Theatre, and 200-seat black box Seeler Studio Theatre
	McCullough Student Center	1912	Originally a gymnasium; converted into a student center after an expansion and remodel
	Memorial Field House	1949	Building is a former air base in New York. It was moved to Middlebury by truck and reassembled there.
	Middlebury Chapel	1916	Chapel for formal events; built in the style of a traditional New England meeting house combined with the marble of the American neoclassical style. Above the colonnade is a quote from Psalm 95, "The strength of the hills is His also." Also has an 11-bell carillon.
	Milliken Hall	1969 or 1970	Sophomore dormitory
	Munroe Hall	1941	Houses classrooms as well as faculty offices for the political science, religion, sociology and anthropology, and economics departments
	Old Chapel	1836	Administrative building
	Painter Hall	1816	The oldest Vermont college building still standing; used as a dormitory as of 2019. National fraternity Kappa Delta Rho was founded in Painter Hall in 1905.
	Pearsons Hall	1911	Sophomore dormitory
	Perkins House		Spanish house
	Peterson Family Athletics Complex		
	Porter House		
	Proctor Hall	1960	Contains a dining hall and the college bookstore, as well as the recording studio for college radio station WRMC-FM.
	Ridgeline Townhouses	2016	Upperclassmen housing, newest buildings on campus. Became the subject of considerable controversy beginning in 2015 when the student body learned that the buildings would not be accessible to mobility-impaired and disabled students. Over 467 students, or a fifth of the student body, signed a petition calling on administration to halt construction until the buildings could be redesigned to be accessible, but this did not happen and the Ridgeline Townhouses were built on schedule.
	Ridgeline View Suites	2016	Upperclassmen housing, newest buildings on campus. Became the subject of considerable controversy beginning in 2015 when the student body learned that the buildings would not be accessible to mobility-impaired and disabled students. Over 467 students, or a fifth of the student body, signed a petition calling on administration to halt construction until the buildings could be redesigned to be accessible, but this did not happen and the Ridgeline suites were built on schedule.
	Robert A. Jones '59 House (RAJ)		Home to the Rohatyn Center for International Affairs (RCFIA)
	Ross Dining Hall	2004	
	Self Reliance	2009	Middlebury College's first house built for the Solar Decathlon competition
	Service Building and Biomass Gasification Plant		The $12 million biomass gasification plant, opened in 2009, boils and gasifies wood chips to provide steam heating and electricity to the college
	Starr Hall	1860	Rebuilt in 1865 after a fire in 1864
	Stewart Hall	1956	First Year Residence hall
	Sunderland Language Center	1965	Language classrooms and offices; also houses the 272 seat Dana Auditorium, used for lectures, movie screenings, and other events
	Alexander Twilight Hall	1867	Named for Alexander Twilight, the first African-American man to earn a degree from an American college or university. Colloquially known as "Twilight," it houses classrooms and the classics, philosophy, and education departments.
	Virtue Field House	2015	Contains a 200-meter indoor track in a LEED Platinum-certified building.
	Voter Hall	1913	Houses faculty offices for the Arabic, Chinese, and Italian departments on the first floor and basement and upperclassmen housing on the upper floors as of 2019. Originally built as a chemistry building.
	Warner Hall	1901	Houses the economics and mathematics departments
	Wright Hall		Houses the 350-seat Wright Theatre
	Emma Willard House	1811	Used as the college's admissions building. National historic site
	Forest Hall	1936	Dormitory, also houses a darkroom and Islamic prayer space in the basement. Name derived from the fact that its construction was financed by the 1915 sale of a forest to the Federal Government to create the Green Mountain National Forest.
	Natatorium	1996	
	118 South Main Street		Houses the Center for Creativity, Innovation & Social Entrepreneurship (CCISE), also known as the "Innovation Hub"
	121A South Main Street		
	75 Franklin Street		Bread Loaf offices
	Bowker Barn		Staff offices
	Brainerd Commons House		
	Carr Hall	1951	Houses the Anderson Freeman Center, a student center that works to promote a welcoming and inclusive environment for minority and first-generation students
	Chellis House		Home to the gender studies department and the Women's and Gender Studies Resource Center
	Farrell House		Faculty offices, used by the economics department as of 2019
	Hesselgrave House		Faculty offices
	Kitchel House	1867	Home to Middlebury's Center for Careers and Internships'
	Marble Works Offices		Houses finance, human resources, and business services departments in a building off the campus itself
	Nichols House		
	Old Court House		In the town of Middlebury, off the campus itself
	President's House		
	Public Safety		
	Center for Community Engagement		
	Wonnacott Commons House		
	107 Shannon Street		Senior housing (house behind the church)
	220 College Street		
	248 College Street		Senior housing
	23 Adirondack View		Events staff offices
	33 Adirondack View		
	48 South Street		A dormitory, formerly home to the Kappa Delta Rho fraternity/social house before it was shut down in 2015 due to a hazing violation
	637 College Street		Russian house
	70 Hillcrest Road		Home to the Queer Studies House (QSH, pronounced "kwish"), an academic interest house for students interested in queer studies, since 2008
	99 Adirondack View		
	Bowker House		Xenia social house
	Brackett House	1997	Tavern social house
	Brooker House	1997	Outdoor interest house and home to the school's Mountain Club
	Chinese House		
	French House		
	Hadley House and Barn		Used to host college guests
	Hebrew House		
	Homer Harris House		
	Homestead House		
	InSite Solar Decathlon House	2013	Middlebury's second house built for the Solar Decathlon; LEED Platinum certified
	Japanese House		
	Jewett House		Wellness House
	Longwell House		Italian house
	Max Kade Center for German Studies at the Deanery		German house
	McKiney House		
	Meeker House		Dormitory
	Munford House		Dormitory
	PALANA House		PALANA (Pan-African, Latino, Asian, and Native American) is the Intercultural Academic Interest House for students interested in diversity and intercultural issues
	Palmer House	1997	
	Portuguese House		
	Prescott House	1997	Chromatic social house, formerly home to Alpha Delta Phi fraternity/social house until its suspension in 2013.
	Ross Tower		Dormitory. Ross Tower is on the left of the image, and Milliken Hall is on the right.
	Sperry House		Arabic house
	The Mill		Social house
	Turner House		Senior housing
	Weybridge House		Food studies special interest house
	David W. Ginevan Recycling Center		

== See also ==
- Middlebury College
- Middlebury, Vermont
- Middlebury College Snow Bowl
