= Elizabeth Jenns =

British actress (1911–1968)

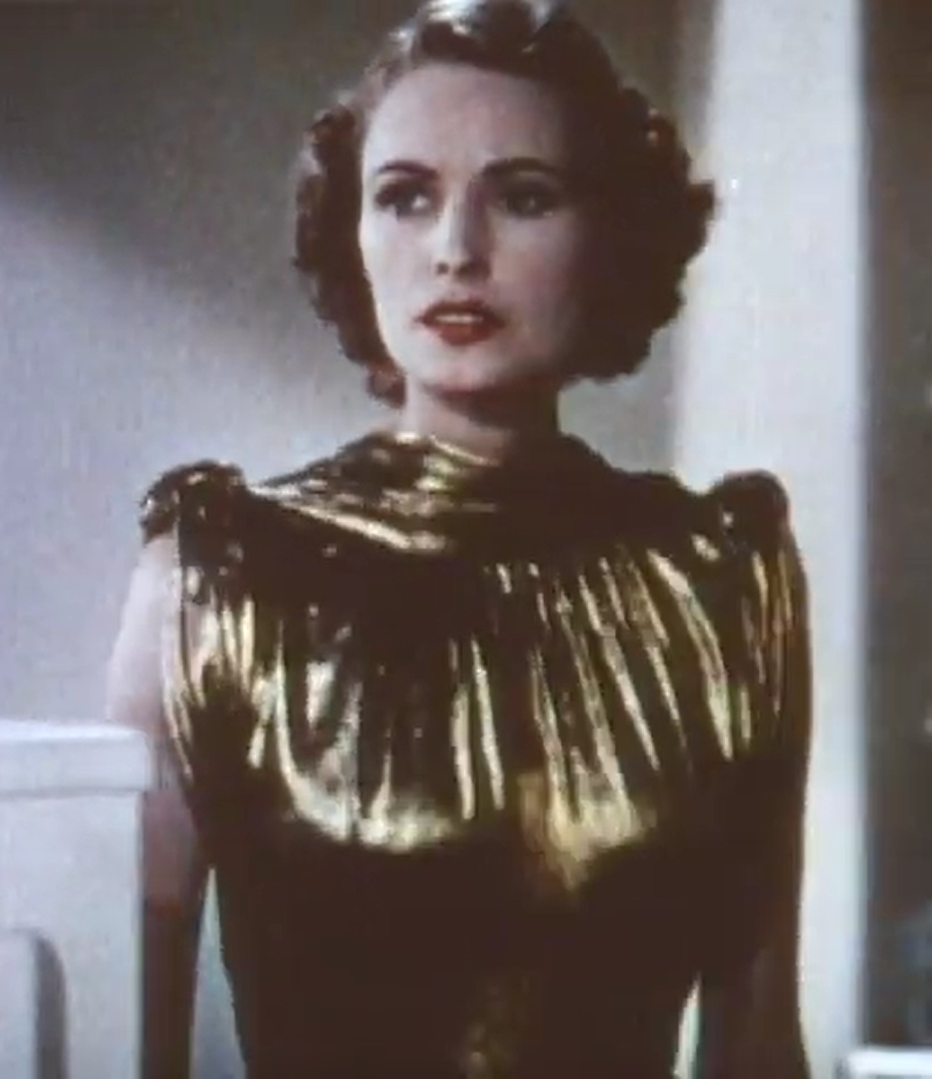
- Jenns in A Star Is Born (1937)
- Born: Muriel Elizabeth Jenns; January 1911; Kidderminster, Worcestershire, England, UK
- Died: 11 January 1968 (aged 56–57); Fond du Lac County, Wisconsin, U.S.
- Occupation: Actress
- Years active: 1933–1937
- Spouses: Harry Crocker (m. 1936; div. 1939) Gardner Clarence Carpenter (m. 1939; died 1952)
- Children: 2

Muriel Elizabeth Jenns (January 1911 – 11 January 1968) was a 1930s British film actress.

Jenns married actor Harry Crocker in late 1936 and then Gardner Clarence Carpenter in late 1939. She made her American film debut in A Star Is Born, acting alongside Fredric March and Janet Gaynor.

She died on January 11, 1968, Fond du Lac County, Wisconsin, United States.

== Films ==
Year	Title	Role	Notes
1933	Channel Crossing		
1933	The Fortunate Fool	Mildred	
1934	Love, Life And Laughter	Actress	
1934	Leave It to Blanche	Blossom	
1935	Full Circle	Leonora Allway	
1935	Jimmy Boy	The Princess	
1937	A Star Is Born	Anita Regis	(final film role)
