= James O'Donnell (politician) =

American politician (1840–1915)

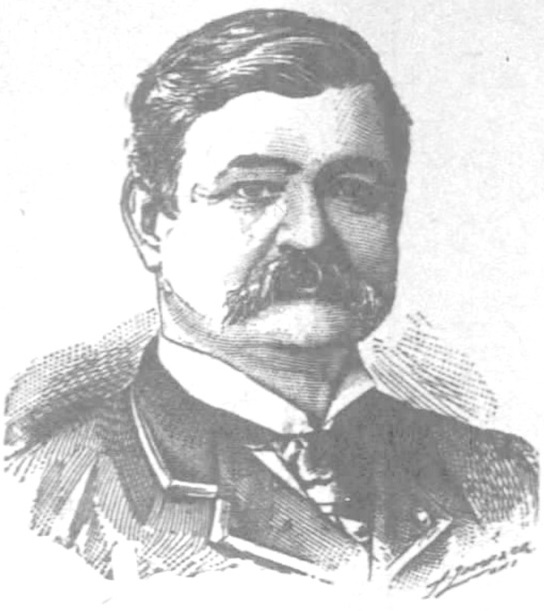
- Port Huron Daily Times (Port Huron, MI), October 2, 1896

Member of the U.S. House of Representatives from Michigan's 3rd district
- In office March 4, 1885 – March 3, 1893
- Preceded by: Edward S. Lacey
- Succeeded by: Julius C. Burrows

Personal details
- Born: March 25, 1840 Norwalk, Connecticut, U.S
- Died: March 17, 1915 (aged 74) Jackson, Michigan, U.S
- Resting place: Mount Evergreen Cemetery, Jackson, Michigan; 42°14′14.885″N 84°24′40.234″W
- Party: Republican

James O’Donnell (March 25, 1840 – March 17, 1915) was a politician from the U.S. State of Michigan.

== Biography ==
O’Donnell was born in Norwalk, Connecticut, and moved to Jackson, Michigan, with his parents in 1848. He pursued preparatory studies and learned the printing trade. During the Civil War, he enlisted as a private in the First Regiment, Michigan Volunteer Infantry, and served two years. He served as recorder of the city of Jackson from 1863 to 1866 and established the Jackson Daily Citizen in 1865. He was a Presidential elector in 1872 and served as mayor of Jackson in 1876 and 1877. He was appointed in 1878 aide-de-camp on the staff of Governor Charles Croswell, with the rank of colonel.

O’Donnell was elected as a Republican from Michigan's 3rd congressional district to the 49th United States Congress and to the three succeeding Congresses, serving from March 4, 1885, to March 3, 1893. He served as chairman of the Committee on Education during the 51st Congress. In 1892, he ran in Michigan's 2nd congressional district, losing to Democrat James S. Gorman.

O’Donnell returned to Jackson and devoted his time to the publication of the Jackson Daily Citizen, and retired in 1910. He was considered the father of the beet-sugar industry of Michigan. He died in Jackson at age 74 and was interred there in Mount Evergreen Cemetery.

U.S. House of Representatives
Preceded by Edward S. Lacey	United States Representative for the 3rd congressional district of Michigan; 1885 – 1893	Succeeded by Julius C. Burrows
