= Harry Crocker =

American journalist and actor (1893–1958)

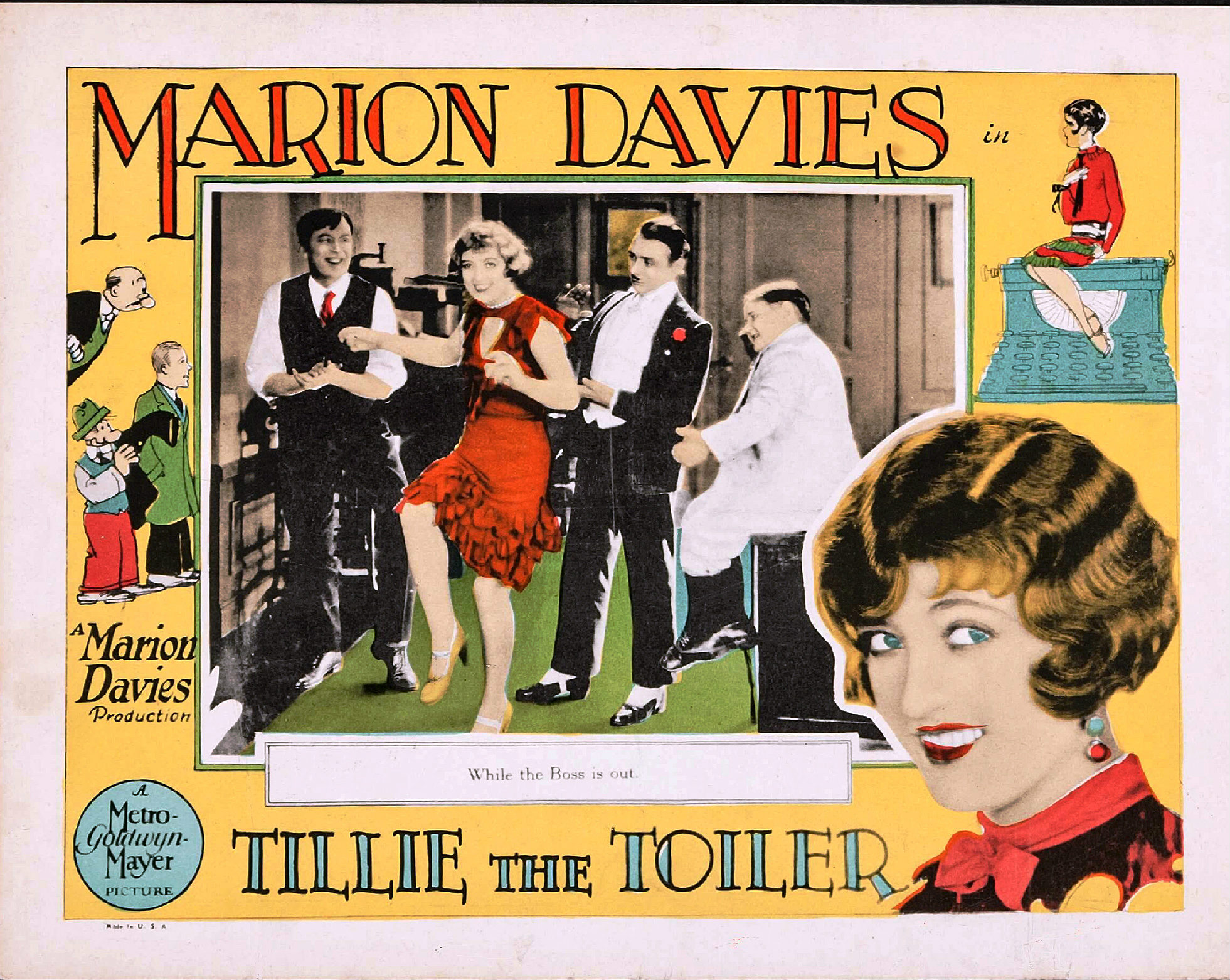
- Lobby card for Tillie the Toiler (1927) with Crocker second from right
- Born: 2 July 1893; San Francisco, California, US
- Died: 23 May 1958 (aged 64); Beverly Hills, California, US
- Parent(s): Henry J. Crocker; Mary Ives Crocker

Henry Joseph Crocker II (July 2, 1893 – May 23, 1958) was an American journalist, film actor, and member of the wealthy Crocker family.

== Life and career ==
Although Crocker was for most of his career a Los Angeles Examiner newsman, he also appeared as Rex in Charlie Chaplin's The Circus in 1928. He was Chaplin's personal assistant until he was fired during the making of Chaplin's City Lights in 1930. Crocker later reconciled with Chaplin and maintained a friendship until the comedian left America in 1952.

Overall, Crocker appeared in 20 films between 1925 and 1952, mostly in small roles or cameo appearances. His other films besides The Circus include The Big Parade (1925), Tillie the Toiler (1927), Sally in Our Alley (1927), A Warm Corner (1930), The Great John L. (1945), A Song for Miss Julie (1945) and Limelight (1952).

His grand uncle was Charles Crocker (1822–1888) who had been a builder of the Central Pacific Railroad and his distant cousins were the philanthropist William Henry Crocker, president of Crocker National Bank, mystic, princess and writer Aimée Crocker and Templeton Crocker past president of the California Historical Society who funded and headed expeditions with the California Academy of Sciences and other academic institutions aboard his personal yacht. Crocker married Elizabeth Jenns in late 1936. Crocker was also a close friend of Cole Porter. He died on May 23, 1958, after being in ill health for three years.

== Filmography ==
Year	Title	Role	Notes
1925	The Gold Rush		Uncredited unit publicist
1925	The Big Parade	Soldier	Uncredited
1926	La Bohème	Bit part	Uncredited
1927	Tillie the Toiler	Pennington Fish	
1927	Sally in Our Alley	Chester Drake	
1927	Becky	John Carroll Estabrook	
1927	South Sea Love	Bob Bernard	
1928	The Circus	Rex, A Tight Rope Walker	Also played a disgruntled property man and a clown. He was also an assistant director and uncredited unit publicist
1928	Show People	Himself	Cameo appearance
1930	A Warm Corner	Joseph	
1931	City Lights		He was Charlie Chaplin's assistant director during the making of this film but was fired, Also an uncredited writer and unit publicist
1933	The Good Companions	Unklearther	
1936	Jack of All Trades	Uncredited appearance	
1941	H. M. Pulham, Esq.	Bob Ridge	
1942	Gentleman Jim	Charles Crocker	
1943	A Night for Crime	Arthur Brisbane	
1945	A Song for Miss Julie	John Firbank	
1945	The Great John L.	Arthur Brisbane	
1946	Night and Day	John Firbank	
1947	Monsieur Verdoux		Uncredited unit publicist
1949	Dancing in the Dark	Master of Ceremonies	
1950	The Great Jewel Robber	Commentator	
1952	Limelight		Publicist Director
