= Barton Hepburn =

American actor (1906–1955)

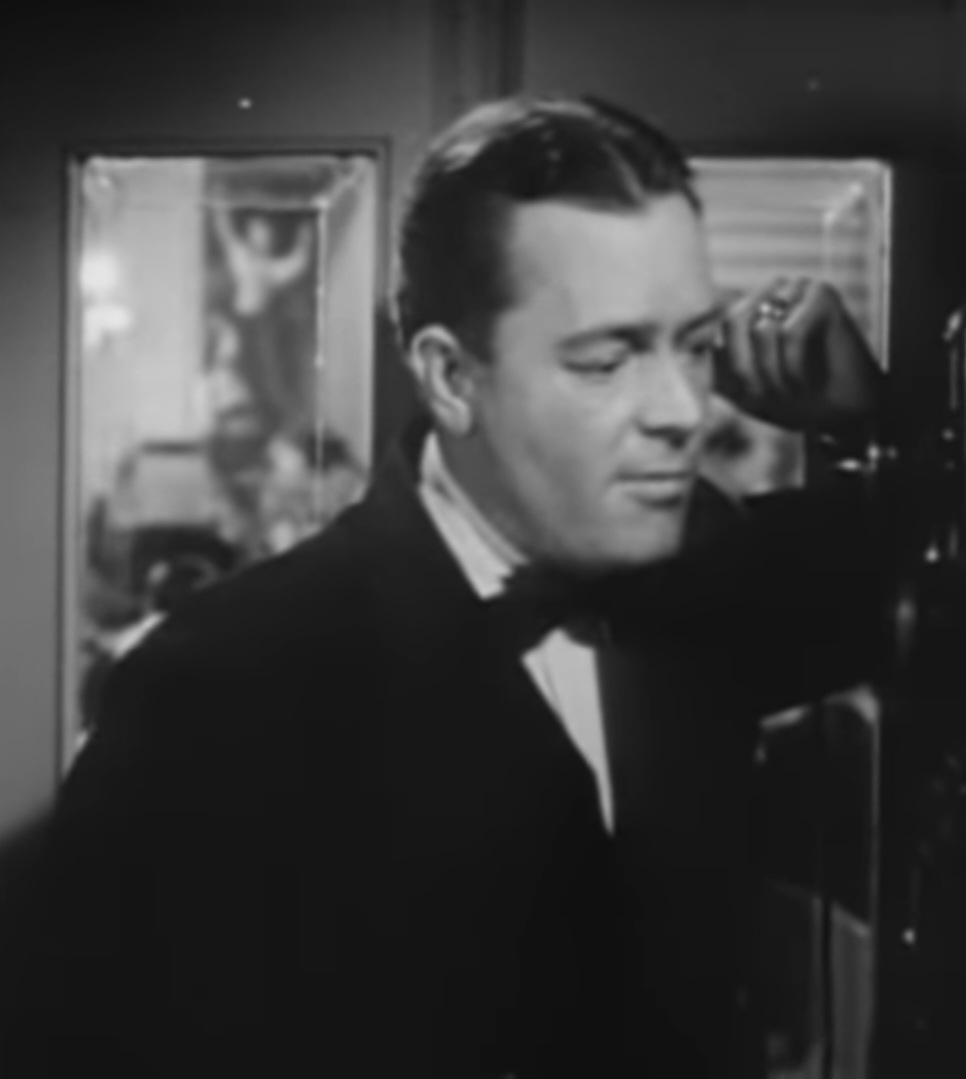
- Hepburn in Hi Diddle Diddle (1943)
- Born: February 28, 1906; Minneapolis, Minnesota, U.S.
- Died: October 9, 1955 (aged 49); Los Angeles, California, U.S.
- Occupation: Actor
- Years active: 1929–1950
- Parent(s): Charles Fisher Hepburn; Alice Smith Hepburn
- Relatives: A. Barton Hepburn (grandfather)

Barton Hepburn (February 28, 1906 – October 9, 1955) was an American actor who specialized in drama and comedy.

== Early life ==
Hepburn was born in Minneapolis, Minnesota and was heir to a New York banking fortune. He was a son of Charles Fisher Hepburn (1878–1923), and Alice (née Smith) Hepburn (1881–1914), a daughter of Horatio Alden Smith. His paternal grandfather, Alonzo Barton Hepburn, was a founder of Chase National Bank and Comptroller of the Currency under Presidents Benjamin Harrison and Grover Cleveland.

== Career ==
He was spotted as a stage actor in Los Angeles by the screen director Cecil B. DeMille. He starred in a 1929 production, Painted Faces, an early film with sound. This didn't result in huge success for Hepburn and he returned to the theatre, with a number of appearances on Broadway, until the 1940s when he appeared in a number of films, such as Hi Diddle Diddle (1943), The Bridge of San Luis Rey (1944), and A Song for Miss Julie (1945).

== Personal life ==
Hepburn, who never married, died at his home in Beverly Hills on October 9, 1955. In his will, he left most of his estate to charities catering to "sick or disabled" children. He bequeathed $100,000 to his sister, Jane Hepburn; and $25,000 each to a nephew and niece, James Foster Clark, Jr., and Alice Hepburn Clark, and $10,000 to Father Flanagan's Boys Town in Nebraska.

== Selected filmography ==
- Painted Faces (1929)
