= Sally in Our Alley (1927 film) =

1927 film

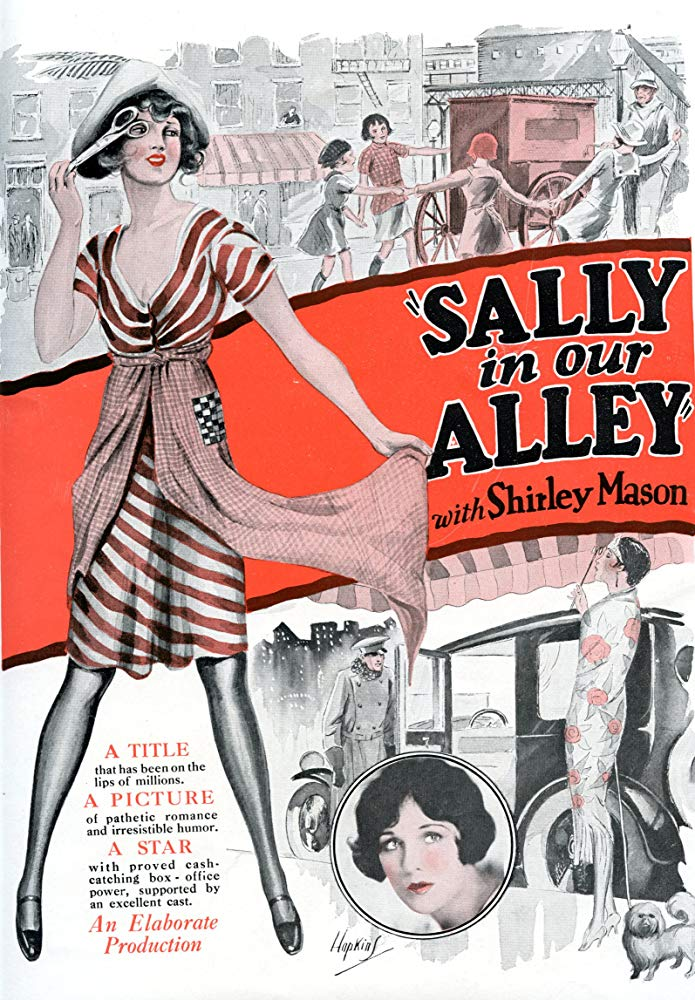
- Film poster
- Directed by: Walter Lang
- Written by: Edward Clark; Dorothy Howell
- Produced by: Harry Cohn
- Starring: Shirley Mason; Richard Arlen; Alec B. Francis
- Cinematography: J.O. Taylor
- Production company: Columbia Pictures
- Distributed by: Columbia Pictures
- Release date: September 3, 1927
- Running time: 56 minutes
- Country: United States
- Language: Silent

Sally in Our Alley is a 1927 American silent comedy drama film directed by Walter Lang and starring Shirley Mason. The film is considered to be lost.

== Cast ==
- Shirley Mason as Sally
- Richard Arlen as Jimmie Adams
- Alec B. Francis as Sandy Mack
- Paul Panzer as Tony Garibaldi
- William H. Strauss as Abraham Lapidowitz
- Kathlyn Williams as Mrs. Gordon Mansfield
- Florence Turner as Mrs. Williams
- Harry Crocker as Chester Drake
