= Painted Faces (1929 film) =

1929 film directed by Albert S. Rogell

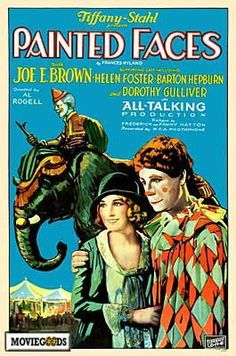
- Directed by: Albert S. Rogell
- Written by: Fanny Hatton; Frederic Hatton; Frances Hyland
- Produced by: John M. Stahl
- Starring: Joe E. Brown; Helen Foster; Barton Hepburn
- Cinematography: Jackson Rose; Benjamin H. Kline
- Edited by: Richard Cahoon
- Music by: Abe Meyer
- Production company: Tiffany-Stahl Productions
- Distributed by: Tiffany Pictures
- Release date: November 20, 1929
- Running time: 74 minutes
- Country: United States
- Language: English

Painted Faces is a 1929 American Pre-Code mystery film directed by Albert S. Rogell and starring Joe E. Brown, Helen Foster and Barton Hepburn. The film's sets were designed by the art director Hervey Libbert.

== Synopsis ==
The film

After a vaudeville performer is murdered, another member of the troupe is arrested. During his trial only one juror, himself an entertainer, holds that he has been framed and seeks out the real culprit.

== Cast ==
- Joe E. Brown as Hermann / Beppo
- Helen Foster as Nancy
- Barton Hepburn as Buddy Barton
- Dorothy Gulliver as Babe Barnes
- Lester Cole as Roderick
- Richard Tucker as District Attorney
- Purnell Pratt as Foreman of Jury
- Mabel Julienne Scott as Mrs. Warren - Nervous Woman Jury Member
- Clem Beauchamp as Jury Member
- Joseph Belmont as Jury Member
- Alma Bennett as Jury Member
- Allan Cavan as Defense Attorney
- William B. Davidson as Ringmaster
- Russ Dudley as Jury Member
- Dannie Mac Grant as Circus Spectator
- Walter Jerry as Jury Member
- Sôjin Kamiyama as Cafe Owner
- Gertrude Kerkis as Little Girl
- Clinton Lyle as Jury Member
- Florence Midgley as Jury Member
- Jack Richardson as Stage Manager
- Howard Truesdale as Jury Member
- May Wallace as Jury Member

== Bibliography ==
- Bruce Babington & Charles Barr. The Call of the Heart: John M. Stahl and Hollywood Melodrama. Indiana University Press, 2018.
