= Hi Diddle Diddle =

1943 film by Andrew L. Stone

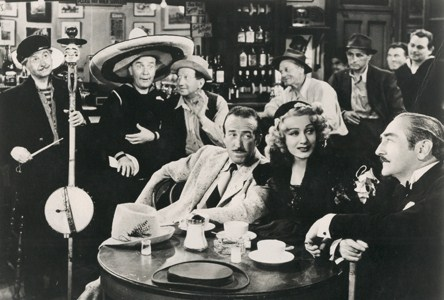
- Film still with June Havoc and Adolphe Menjou (right)
- Directed by: Andrew L. Stone
- Written by: Edmund L. Hartmann (writer); Frederick J. Jackson (screenplay); Andrew L. Stone (story)
- Produced by: Edward Finney (associate producer); Andrew L. Stone (producer)
- Starring: Adolphe Menjou; Martha Scott; Pola Negri
- Cinematography: Charles Edgar Schoenbaum
- Edited by: Harvey Manger
- Music by: Phil Boutelje
- Production company: Andrew L. Stone Productions
- Distributed by: United Artists
- Release date: August 2, 1943 (United States)
- Running time: 72 minutes
- Country: United States
- Language: English

Hi Diddle Diddle is a 1943 American comedy film made and directed by Andrew L. Stone and starring Adolphe Menjou, Martha Scott, Dennis O'Keefe, June Havoc, Billie Burke, and Pola Negri. The title is a play on the nursery rhyme "Hey Diddle Diddle" and the use of diddle as a word for confidence trick. The film features animated portions from Leon Schlesinger's studio with the fast moving screenplay frequently breaking the fourth wall.

This film is in the public domain. It's also known as Diamonds and Crime (American reissue title).

Leslie Halliwell in the seventh edition, (page 463), of 'Halliwell's Film Guide' says it was "AKA 'Try and Find It'".

== Plot ==
Young Janie Prescott is about to be married to her sailor sweetheart, Sonny Phyffe, but the wedding is delayed because the ship hasn't arrived to its dock. The wedding ceremony has to be pushed forward, and is combined with a christening ceremony that is to be performed by the same pastor. Sonny's ship eventually docks and when he meets his father, small-time swindler Hector, before the wedding, he is given a corsage to pass on to Janie. Hector has actually stolen the corsage from his wife (Sonny's stepmother), opera singer Genya Smetana. Hector isn't aware of that the corsage has real diamonds in it, and it is a gift from the opera where Genya works. Unfortunately the wedding is yet again delayed when it is discovered that Peter Carrington III, Janie's previous suitor, has managed to lose all of Mrs. Prescott's money on bad investments and a roulette table at the 59 Club. The family is now broke. Sonny then tells Janie he doesn't care about her money and the wedding proceeds as planned, after Sonny agrees to let his father help Mrs. Prescott get her money back.

With the help of some friends Hector manages to fix the roulette tables at the 59 Club, and after the wedding he drags Sonny to the club before he goes off on his honeymoon. Sonny wins repeatedly, and Peter who watches, decides to make another attempt at sabotaging the relation between Janie and Sonny. He takes Janie, Mrs. Prescott and a Senator Simpson to 59 Club. Confusion and suspicion arises as Hector is seen with his friend, night club singer Leslie, in a compromising position, and then Janie sees Sonny in a similar way. Genya is oblivious about her step-son Sonny, whom she does not know even exists, and Janie who he is about to marry, so she thinks Hector has married Janie and given her the stolen corsage.

Janie is then called to service as an air raid warden before she has time to go away on her honeymoon, while Sonny spends the night alone. To venge all the trouble that has arisen, Hector sets up to trick Peter into a bad business deal, buying worthless stock to a high price. Sonny owns such stock and when Peter is scammed, Sonny makes a fine profit. It turns out though that the banker in charge of the transaction bought the stock himself to make a good deal, and that Peter and Mrs. Prescott staged the loss of their property to test Sonny's intentions with Janie. Genya learns that Hector has a son from another relation, who is married to Janie. Sonny and Janie finally reunite at his father's apartment, and they spend the rest of their two-day honeymoon at her apartment. When a new order is given that Sonny has to travel immediately with his ship, the maid covers for the couple and lies, saying they already left town. Thus they get to be undisturbed for the weekend, and everyone else meet at Hector's apartment, singing Wagner opera songs together.

== Cast ==
- Adolphe Menjou as Col. Hector Phyffe
- Martha Scott as Janie Prescott Phyffe
- Pola Negri as Genya Smetana
- Dennis O'Keefe as Sonny Phyffe
- Billie Burke as Liza Prescott
- Walter Kingsford as Senator Jummy Simpson
- Barton Hepburn as Peter Warrington III
- Georges Metaxa as Tony Spinelli
- Eddie Marr as Michael Angelo, Croupier
- Paul Porcasi as Impresario
- Bert Roach as Husband, Taxi Cab Bit
- Chick Chandler as Saunders, Hector's Chauffeur
- Lorraine Miller as Director's Friend
- Marek Windheim as Pianist
- Richard Hageman as Boughton
- Ellen Lowe as Flory, the Maid
- Barry Macollum as Angus, the Club Cashier
- Joe Devlin as Dan Hannigan, the Bartender
- Hal K. Dawson as Dr. Agnew, the Minister
- Andrew Tombes as Mike, the Doorman
- Byron Foulger as Watson, the Brokerage Firm Clerk
- Ann Hunter as Sandra
- June Havoc as Leslie Quayle

== Reception ==
Film critic Leonard Maltin dismisses Hi Diddle Diddle as a "triffling screwball comedy" with a rating of two stars (out of four). But in their 1970 study, Hollywood in the Forties, Charles Higham and Joel Greenberg rate the film as "among the best" of that era's "zany comedies," one that succeeds "in being sophisticated and sharp-witted at the same time," with a script of "unusual surrealist inventiveness."

== Soundtrack ==
- June Havoc - "I Loved You too Little, too Late" (Written by Phil Boutelje and Foster Carling)
- Pola Negri - "Evening Star" (from "Tannhäuser" written by Richard Wagner)
- June Havoc - "The Man with the Big Sombrero" (Written by Phil Boutelje and Foster Carling)
- Pola Negri, Billie Burke, Paul Porcasi, Lorraine Miller and others - "The Pilgrim's Chorus" (from "Tannhäuser" written by Richard Wagner)

== Quotes ==
- Senator Simpson [Looking at hat check girl]: You know, I've seen that girl somewhere before.
- Liza Prescott: She's a very particular friend of the director who's making this picture. He sticks her in every scene he can.
- Janie Prescott: Mother, shh! Somebody might hear you.
- Col. Hector Phyffe: [seeing his wife appear unexpectedly as he is kissing another woman] My wife! Stand by to render first aid!
- Leslie Quayle: Hi, sailor. Your father working today for a change?
- Sonny Phyffe: Yes. You want him?
- Leslie Quayle: No thanks, honey. I just want to see him.
