= The Hepburn Committee =

The Hepburn Committee was created in 1879 by an act of the New York State Legislature. A. Barton Hepburn was directed by the State Legislature to investigate the railroads' practice of giving freight rate rebates (as much as 25%) to certain of their largest corporate clients, creating what were in effect much higher freight rates for smaller companies and an unfair advantage for some of the largest corporations in the nation - like John D. Rockefeller's Standard Oil Company. Merchants without ties to the oil industry had pressed for the hearings. Prior to the committee's investigation, few knew of the size of Standard Oil's control and influence on seemingly unaffiliated oil refineries and pipelines - Hawke (1980) cites that only a dozen or so within Standard Oil knew the extent of company operations. The committee counsel, Simon Sterne, questioned representatives from the Erie Railroad and the New York Central Railroad and discovered that at least half of their long-haul traffic granted rebates, and that much of this traffic came from Standard Oil. The committee then shifted focus to Standard Oil's operations. John Dustin Archbold, as president of Acme Oil Company, denied that Acme was associated with Standard Oil. He then admitted to being a director of Standard Oil. The committee's final report scolded the railroads for their rebate policies and cited Standard Oil as an example. This scolding was largely moot to Standard Oil's interests since long-distance oil pipelines were now their preferred method of transportation.

The committee found that stock watering was prevalent in the rail industry, as stock was frequently issued for speculative purposes.

== See also ==
- John D. Rockefeller
- Henry Huttleston Rogers
