= A. Barton Hepburn =

American politician and banker

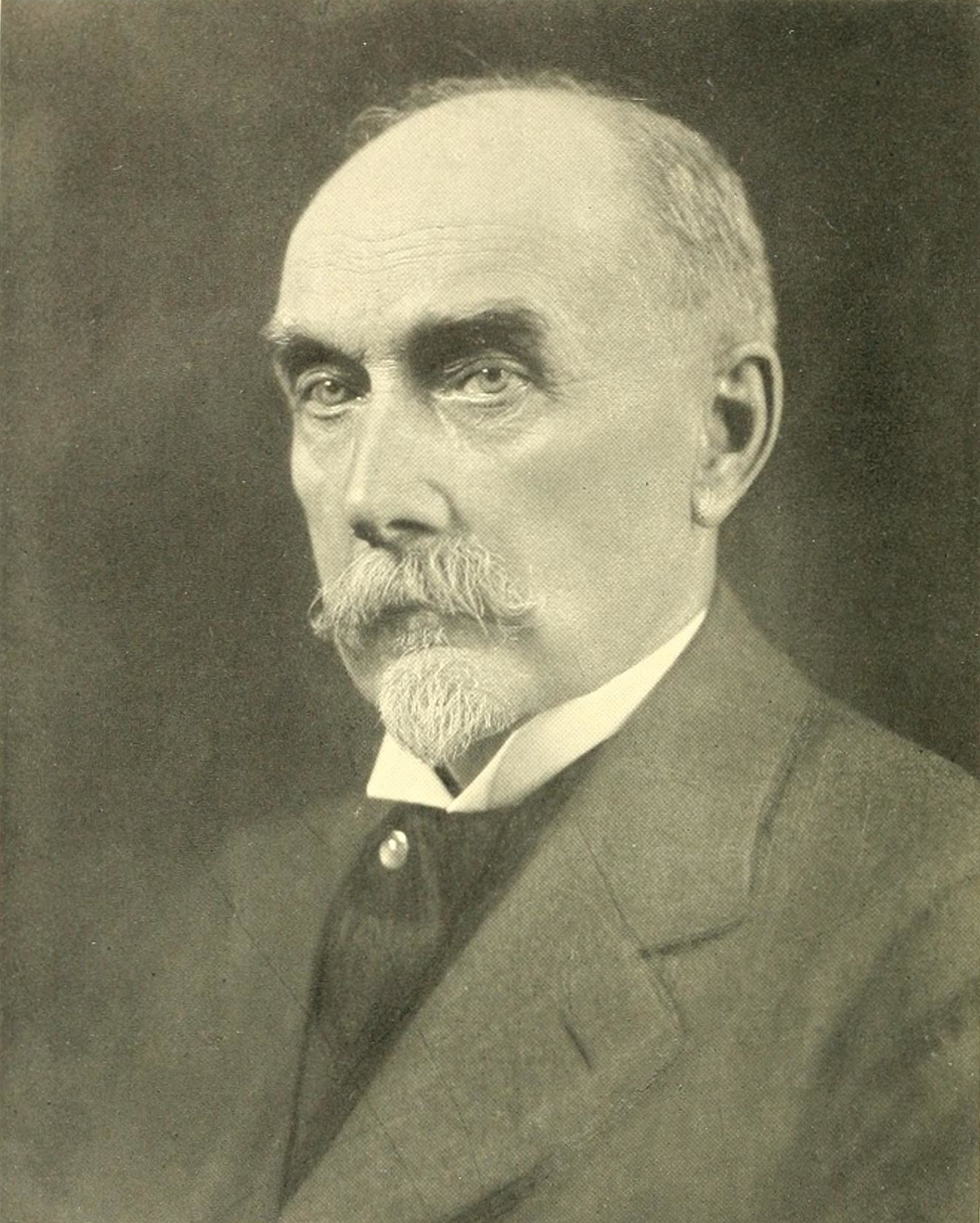

President of Chase National Bank
- In office 1904–1917
- Preceded by: Henry W. Cannon
- Succeeded by: Albert H. Wiggin

8th Comptroller of the Currency
- In office August 2, 1892 – April 25, 1893
- President: Benjamin Harrison; Grover Cleveland
- Preceded by: Edward S. Lacey
- Succeeded by: James H. Eckels

Member of the New York State Assembly for St. Lawrence Co.
- In office January 1, 1875 – December 31, 1879

Personal details
- Born: Alonzo Barton Hepburn; July 24, 1846 Colton, New York, U.S.
- Died: January 25, 1922 (aged 75) New York City, U.S.
- Party: Republican
- Spouses: Harriet A. Fisher (m. 1873; died 1881); Emily L. Eaton (m. 1887)
- Relations: Barton Hepburn (grandson)
- Education: Middlebury College

Alonzo Barton Hepburn (July 24, 1846 – January 25, 1922) was an American banker and politician from New York, famed for being the Chairman of the New York State Legislature's eponymous Hepburn Committee of 1879 that investigated the operations of what became known later as the Railroad Trust based in New York State. He was Comptroller of the Currency from 1892 to 1893.

== Early life ==
Hepburn was born on a farm in Colton, St. Lawrence County, New York on July 24, 1846. He was the youngest of four sons born to Zina Earl Hepburn (1798–1874) and Beulah (née Gray) Hepburn (1807–1900). His maternal uncle was a founder of the Cleveland Plain-Dealer.

He attended St. Lawrence Academy and the Fuller Academy at Oswego before attending Middlebury College where he graduated in 1871; later serving as a trustee. In 1906 he was given an honorary degree by St. Lawrence University.

== Career ==
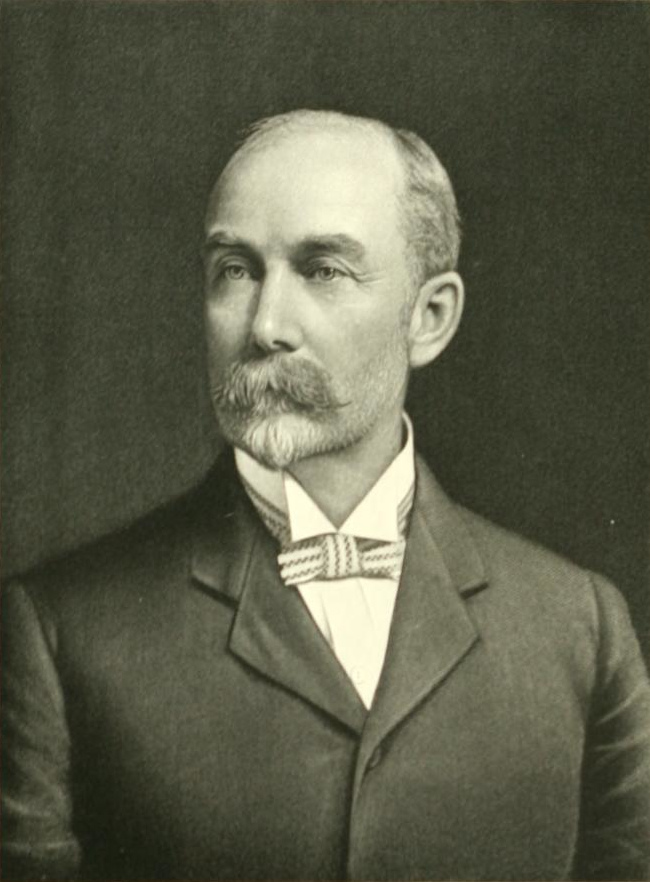
Hepburn from a 1913 publication.

In 1871, he returned to St. Lawrence Academy (today's St. Lawrence University) where he became a Professor of Mathematics before serving as Principal of Ogdensburg Educational Institute and was elected school commissioner, while studying law.

=== New York State Assembly ===
He was elected as a Republican to be a member of the New York State Assembly (St. Lawrence Co., 2nd D.) in 1875, 1876, 1877, 1878 and 1879. While serving in the Assembly, Hepburn was directed by the New York State Legislature in 1879 to investigate the railroads' practice of giving rebates within the state. Merchants without ties to the oil industry had pressed for the hearings.

Prior to the committee's investigation, few knew of the size of Standard Oil's control and influence on seemingly unaffiliated oil refineries and pipelines, with only a dozen or so within Standard Oil knew the extent of company operations. The committee counsel, Simon Sterne, questioned representatives from the Erie Railroad and the New York Central Railroad and discovered that at least half of their long-haul traffic granted rebates, and that much of this traffic came from Standard Oil. The committee then shifted focus to Standard Oil's operations. John Dustin Archbold, as president of Acme Oil Company, denied that Acme was associated with Standard Oil. He then admitted to being a director of Standard Oil. The committee's final report scolded the railroads for their rebate policies and cited Standard Oil as an example. This scolding was largely moot to Standard Oil's interests since long-distance oil pipelines were now their preferred method of transportation.

=== Later career ===
On April 13, 1880, he was appointed Superintendent of the New York State Banking Department, serving until 1883 when Willis S. Paine was appointed as his successor. He then served three years as National Bank Examiner for the cities of New York and Brooklyn before his appointment as Comptroller of the Currency by President Benjamin Harrison. An internationally recognized authority on financial and economic questions, Hepburn returned to banking when President Grover Cleveland took office. He later succeeded Henry W. Cannon as president of the Chase National Bank. Hepburn was a Director of the Studebaker Corporation.

After leaving the office of Comptroller he worked in the field of banking, becoming the president of the Third National Bank of New York then the Vice-President of the National City Bank in 1897 when the Third National Bank merged with other banks to form that company. He then became the President of the Chase National Bank.

A prolific writer on the economy and financial matters, he wrote the books History of Coinage and Currency in the United States: Perennial Contest for Sound Money (1903), A History of Currency in the United States" (1915), and "Artificial Waterways and Commercial Development. He also regularly contributed to magazines and periodicals.

== Personal life ==
In 1873, he married Harriet A. Fisher, of St. Albans, Vermont, who died in 1881, leaving him with two sons:

- Harold Barton Hepburn (d. 1892)
- Charles Fisher Hepburn (1878–1923), who married Alice Smith (1881–1914), a daughter of Horatio Alden Smith.

In 1887, he married suffragist Emily L. Eaton (1865–1956), of Montpelier, Vermont. Emily was a niece of Dorman Bridgman Eaton, a lawyer instrumental in American federal Civil Service reform. They lived at 471 Park Avenue and were the parents of two daughters:

- Beulah Eaton Hepburn (1890–1978), founder of the High Mowing School in Wilton, New Hampshire who married Rear Admiral Robert R. M. Emmet.
- Cordelia Susan Hepburn (1894–1960), who married Harvard graduate and stockbroker Paul Cushman (1891–1971) in 1923.

Hepburn died in New York City on January 25, 1922, as a result of injuries sustained in a motor bus accident on Fifth Avenue. He left an estate of nearly $10 million. After his death, his wife was involved in the development of the Beekman Tower at the corner of First Avenue and East 49th Street. Through his son Charles, he was a grandfather of actor Barton Hepburn.

=== Philanthropy and legacy ===
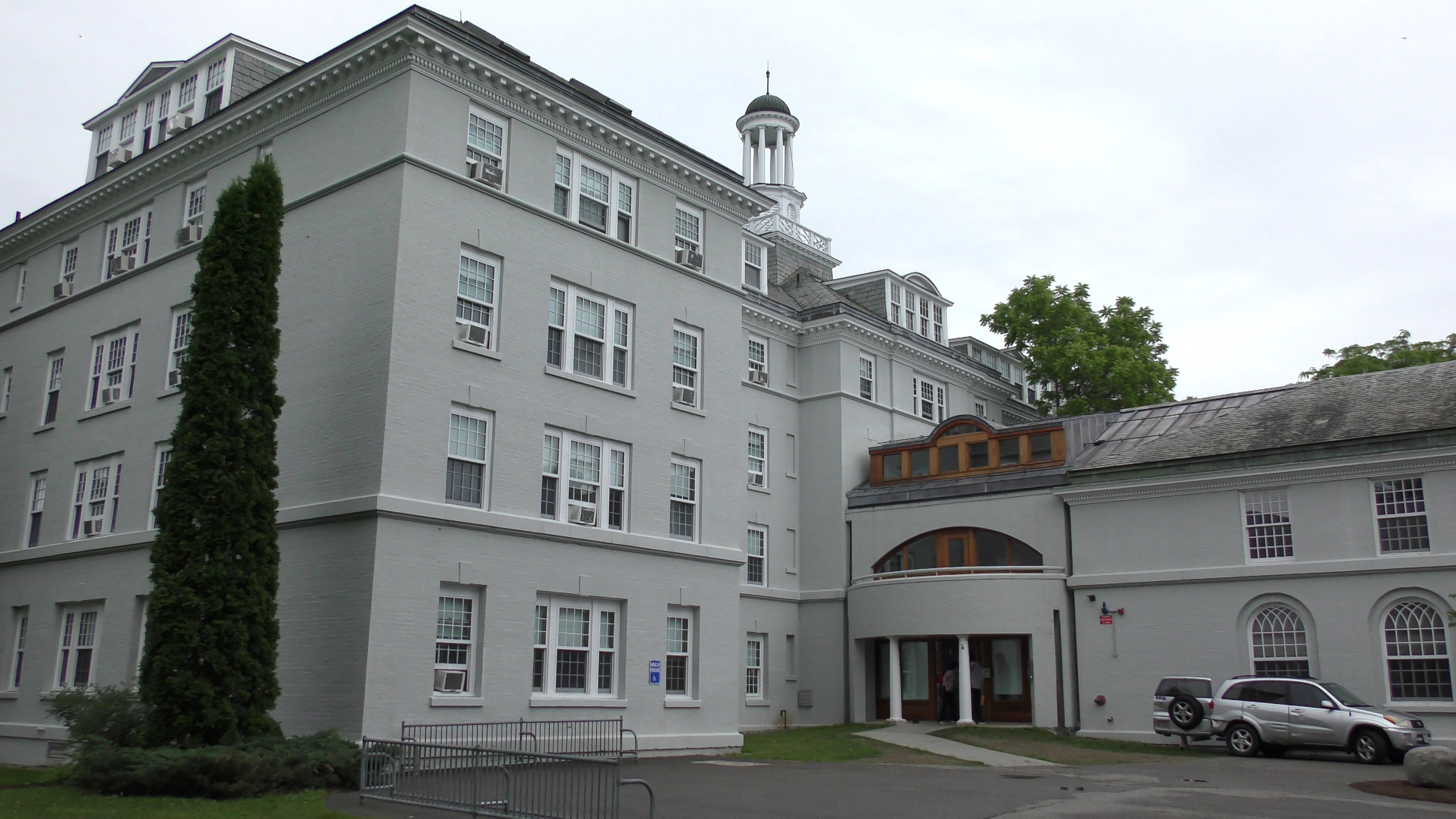
Hepburn Hall at Middlebury College

Somewhat philanthropic, Hepburn donated funds to allow for the construction of libraries for each school he oversaw when he was District Superintendent in St. Lawrence County, New York. Three of these libraries are listed on the National Register of Historic Places: the Hepburn Library at Norfolk, New York, Hepburn Library of Colton at Colton, and the Hepburn Library of Lisbon.

Hepburn Hall, a dormitory at Middlebury College whose construction was financed by a gift from Hepburn, is named for him. The building was initially painted bright yellow per Hepburn's request to brighten the appearance of the campus, but was repainted gray following his death to better match the rest of the campus' buildings. Hepburn Hall also contains the Hepburn Zoo, a former dining area turned black box theater, which is so-named because it was originally adorned with Hepburn's hunting trophies.

== Published works ==
- History of coinage and currency in the United States and the perennial contest for sound money. The Macmillan Co., New York (1903)
- Artificial waterways and commercial development (with a history of the Erie canal) The Macmillan Co., New York (1909)
- The story of an outing. Harper & Brothers, New York and London (1913)
- A History of Currency in the United States, with a Brief Description of the Currency Systems of All Commercial Nations. The Macmillan Co., New York (1915)
- Financing the war. A lecture delivered at Princeton University (January 11, 1918)

New York State Assembly
Preceded by Dolphus S. Lynde	New York State Assembly New York County, 11th District; 1875–1879	Succeeded by Worth Chamberlain
Political offices
Preceded by Edward S. Lacey	Comptroller of the Currency; 1892–1893	Succeeded by James H. Eckels
Business positions
Preceded by Henry W. Cannon	Chase President; 1904-1917	Succeeded by Albert H. Wiggin
