= Paul Shorey =

American classical scholar (1857–1934)

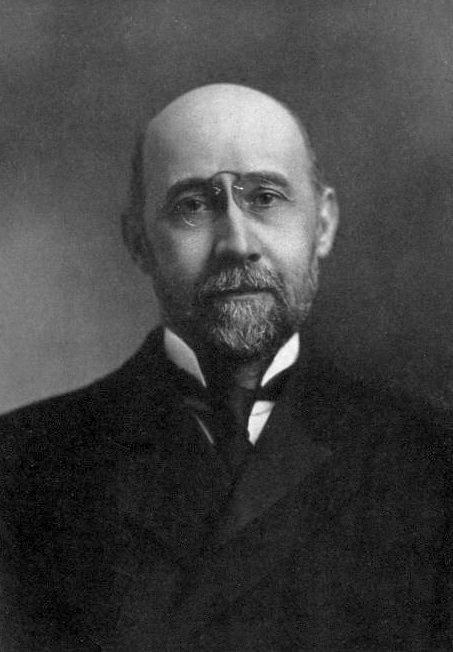
- Professor Shorey, circa 1909.
- Born: August 3, 1857; Davenport, Iowa, United States
- Died: April 24, 1934 (aged 76); Chicago, Illinois, U. S.
- Education: Harvard University; Bryn Mawr College; University of Chicago; Ludwig-Maximilians-Universität München

Paul Shorey (August 3, 1857 – April 24, 1934) was an American classical scholar.

== Biography ==
Shorey was born at Davenport, Iowa. After graduating from Harvard University in 1878, he studied in Europe at Leipzig University, the University of Bonn, the University of Athens, and the Ludwig-Maximilians-Universität München (Ph.D., 1884). He was a professor at several institutions from 1885 onward. Professor Shorey served at Bryn Mawr College (1885–1892), then principally at the University of Chicago. From 1901 to 1902, he was professor in the American School of Classical Studies at Athens, Greece, and from 1913 to 1914, he was Roosevelt Lecturer in the University of Berlin. Professor Shorey was made a member of the National Institute of Arts and Letters. From 1908, he was managing editor of Classical Philology. Shorey was elected to the American Philosophical Society in 1920.

He died in Chicago in 1934. After his death, one of many articles published about him asserted that he knew all 15,693 lines of the Iliad by heart.

== The Roosevelt Lectureship ==
The Roosevelt Lecturership involved giving a series of public lectures. In these, Shorey addressed American culture and literature. Besides the public lectures, however, the Roosevelt Lecturer was required to give a seminar in his own special field of study. As a notable Platonic scholar, Shorey naturally offered to conduct a seminar on Plato. He had not reckoned on the views of American scholarship held by the principal German classicist, Ulrich von Wilamowitz-Moellendorff, who held sway in Berlin. Wilamowitz had no intention of allowing Shorey any scope on Plato:

In a letter to Diels of 8 May 1912 ... he wrote that he considered it 'grotesque that the editor of a Chicago journal be brought to Berlin to teach us philology'. ... Wilamowitz could not of course know that Shorey would later refer to his Platon as a 'historical novel' (What Plato Said 1933 p2.), but could have been aware that in a 1911 article in the Nation ... Shorey had named him in a list of German scholars whose 'big ambitious books ... cannot be trusted' (392). Wilamowitz was no more receptive to Shorey's next suggestion, of Pindar, since the two differed on metrical questions. In the end, permission was given for a seminar on the De Anima.

As Sprague points out, Wilamowitz had not reckoned on Shorey's view that 'Aristotle is a Platonist au fond'. In the seminar he explained the relevance, in his view, of Plato's Theaetetus, Phaedo, Republic, Euthydemus, Sophist. Politicus, Meno, and Philebus to a full and exact understanding of De Anima. Sprague comments: 'I am afraid I find it irresistible to remark that Wilamowitz did not really succeed in preventing Shorey from giving a Plato seminar'.

== Writing ==
Books

- De Platonis Idearum Doctrina. Munich: Theodor Askermann, 1884.
- The Assault on Humanism. Boston: Atlantic Monthly Company, 1917.
- The Unity of Plato's Thought. Chicago: The University of Chicago Press, 1903.
- Sophocles. Cambridge: Harvard University Press, 1931.
- What Plato Said. Chicago: The University of Chicago Press, 1933.
- Platonism, Ancient and Modern. Berkeley, Calif.: University of California Press, 1938.
- Selected Papers, 2 Vols. New York: Garland Pub., 1980.
- The Roosevelt Lectures of Paul Shorey: (1913–1914). Hildesheim: G. Olms Verlag, 1995.

Translations

- An edition of Horace's Odes and Epodes (1898; revised, with Laing, 1910).
- Plato (1937) [1930]. The Republic of Plato : with an English translation by Paul Shorey. Loeb Classical Library. Vol. 1. Translated by Shorey, Paul. Cambridge, Massachusetts; London: Harvard University Press; William Heinemann Ltd. LCCN unk83017287. OCLC 669777366. OL 20425902M. Paul Shorey at the Internet Archive.
- Plato (1935) [1942]. The Republic of Plato : with an English translation by Paul Shorey. Loeb Classical Library. Vol. 2. Translated by Shorey, Paul. Cambridge, Massachusetts; London: Harvard University Press; William Heinemann Ltd. LCCN a44004515. OCLC 669777366. Paul Shorey at the Internet Archive.

Selected articles

- "The Odyssey in Rhythmic English Prose," The Dial, Vol. V, May 1884/April 1885.
- "Hartmann's Philosophy of the Unconscious," The Dial, Vol. V, May 1884/April 1885.
- "The Pagan Christ," The Dial, Vol. VII, May 1886/April 1887.
- "Jevon's History of Greek Literature," The Dial, Vol. VII, May 1886/April 1887.
- "The Science of Thought," The Dial, Vol. VIII, May 1887/April 1888.
- "On the Track of Ulysses," The Dial, Vol. VIII, May 1887/April 1888.
- "Max Müller's Biographies of Words," The Dial, Vol. VIII, May 1887/April 1888.
- "Erdmann's History of Philosophy," The Classical Review, Vol. IV, 1890.
- "A Word with Tennyson Dissenters," The Dial, Vol. XIV, January/June 1893.
- "Plato and Platonism," The Dial, Vol. XIV, January/June 1893.
- "The Homeric Question Once More," The Dial, Vol. XV, July/December 1893.
- "An Evolutionist's Alarm," The Dial, Vol. XV, July/December 1893.
- "Spencer on the Principles of Beneficence," The Dial, Vol. XV, July/December 1893.
- "Greek Poetry and Life," The Dial, Vol. XVI, January/June 1894.
- "The Idea of Good in Plato's Republic." In: Studies in Classical Philology, Vol. I, The University of Chicago Press, 1895.
- "To Ancient Greek through Modern? No!," The Forum, Vol. XVIII, 1895.
- "Can We Revive the Olympic Games?," The Forum, Vol. XIX, 1895.
- "Paris Commune of 1871," The Dial, Vol. XX, January/June 1896.
- "Present Conditions of Literary Production," The Atlantic Monthly, Vol. LXXVIII, 1896.
- "Discipline vs. Dissipation in Secondary Education," School Review, Vol. V, 1897.
- "A New Classical Dictionary," The Dial, Vol. XXII, January/June 1897.
- "The Monuments and Antiquities of Greece," The Dial, Vol. XXIV, January/June 1898.
- "Plato." In: Philosophers and Scientists, Vol. I, Doubleday & McClure Company, 1899.
- "The Successors of Homer," The Dial, Vol. XXVI, January/June 1899.
- "Religion in Greek Literature," The Dial, Vol. XXVII, July/December 1899.
- "History of Modern Philosophy," The Dial, Vol. XXIX, July/December 1900.
- "Plato, Lucretius and Epicurus," Harvard Studies in Classical Philology, Vol. XII, 1901.
- "Science of Meaning," The Dial, Vol. XXX, January/June 1901.
- "An Historian of Ideas," The Dial, Vol. XXX, January/June 1901.
- "The Greek Thinkers and their Environment," The Dial, Vol. XXXI, July/December 1901.
- "Philology and Classical Philology," The Classical Journal, Vol. I, No. 6, May 1906.
- "The Influence of the Classics on American Literature," The Chautauquan, Vol. XLIII, 1906.
- "Discipline in Modern Education," The Bookman, Vol. XXIII, 1906.
- "Mr. Lang's Homeric Queries," The Dial, Vol. XLII, January/June 1907.
- "Benjamin Jowett, Teacher, Platonist and Scholar," The Chautauquan, Vol. XLVI, 1907.
- "A Dramatic Historian," The Dial, Vol. XLIII, July/December 1907.
- "The Equivocations of Pragmatism," The Dial, Vol. XLIII, July/December 1907.
- "Relations of Classical Literature to Other Branches of Learning," International Congress of Arts and Science, Vol. VI, 1908.
- "The Spirit of the University of Chicago," The University of Chicago Magazine, Vol. I, No. 6, April 1909.
- "The Poet of Science," The Dial, Vol. XLVI, January/June 1909.
- "Spelling Reform in Extremis," The Dial, Vol. XLVII, July/December 1909.
- "Mill Revealed in his Letters," The Dial, Vol. XLVIII, January/June 1910.
- "The Case for the Classics," The School Review, Vol. XVIII, No. 9, 1910.
- "Talks on Character and Temperament," The Dial, Vol. XLIX, July/December 1910.
- "American Scholarship," Educational Review, Vol. XLII, June/December 1911.
- "The Study of Greek Literature." In: Greek Literature, The Columbia University Press, 1912.
- "The Place of the Languages and Literatures in the College Curriculum." In The American College, Henry Holt and Company, 1915.
- "The Bigotry of the New Education," The Nation, Vol. CV, 1917.
- "The Assault on Humanism," Part II, The Atlantic Monthly, Vols. CXIX/CXX, 1917.
- "Fifty Years of Classical Studies in America," Transactions and Proceedings of the American Philological Association, Vol. L, 1919.
- "A Note on Herodotus," Classical Philology, Vol. XV, 1920.

Other publications

- Pope's translation of The Iliad of Homer, with an introduction and notes by Paul Shorey, 1899.
- "Herodotus." In: The New International Encyclopædia, Vol. X, Dodd, Mead & Company, 1906, pp. 14–15.
- "Homer." In: The New International Encyclopædia, Vol. X, Dodd, Mead & Company, 1906, pp. 166–168.
- "Pindar." In: The New International Encyclopædia, Vol. XVI, Dodd, Mead & Company, 1906, pp. 31–32.
- "Plato." In: The New International Encyclopædia, Vol. XVI, Dodd, Mead & Company, 1906, 101–104.
- Marion Mills Miller (ed.), The Classics, Greek and Latim, with an introduction by Paul Shorey, 1909.

== Legacy ==
A house in University of Chicago College housing is named in Shorey's honor. Shorey House was located in Pierce Tower until that building's demolition in 2013 and is now located in International House.

Shorey's student, Harold F. Cherniss, was a well-known historian of ancient philosophy at the Institute for Advanced Study in Princeton and defended Shorey's unitarian interpretation of Plato in several influential books. Shorey's views thus became a central theme of later debates over Plato and Aristotle.
