= Edward S. Lacey =

American politician

Edward Lacey
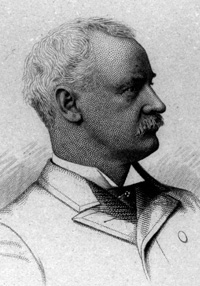

7th Comptroller of the Currency
- In office May 1, 1889 – June 30, 1892
- Preceded by: William L. Trenholm
- Succeeded by: A. Barton Hepburn

Member of the U.S. House of Representatives from Michigan's 3rd district
- In office March 4, 1881 – March 3, 1885
- Preceded by: Jonas H. McGowan
- Succeeded by: James O'Donnell

Personal details
- Born: November 26, 1835 Chili, New York, U.S.
- Died: October 2, 1916 (aged 80) Evanston, Illinois, U.S.
- Party: Republican
- Education: Olivet College
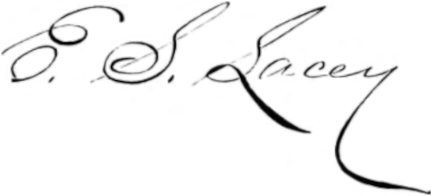
- Signature

Edward Samuel Lacey (November 26, 1835 – October 2, 1916) was a politician from the U.S. state of Michigan and Comptroller of the Currency from 1889 to 1892.

== Biography ==
Lacey was born in Chili, New York and moved with his parents to Branch County, Michigan, in October 1842, and then to Eaton County in March 1843. He attended the public schools and Olivet College and engaged in various business pursuits and in banking. He was a resident of Kalamazoo, 1853–1857 and moved to Charlotte, where he was register of deeds for Eaton County, 1860–1864, and the mayor of Charlotte in 1871. He was also trustee of the Michigan Asylum for the Insane 1874–1880, and a delegate to the Republican National Convention in 1876.

Lacey was elected as a Republican to represent Michigan's 3rd congressional district in the Forty-seventh and Forty-eighth Congresses, serving from March 4, 1881, to March 3, 1885.

Lacey declined to be a candidate for reelection in 1884. He also served as chairman of the Michigan Republican Party, 1882–1884. He was commissioned by U.S. President Benjamin Harrison to be Comptroller of the Currency on April 17, 1889, and was reappointed December 16, 1889, serving until his resignation in 1892. He moved to Chicago and again engaged in banking. He died in Evanston, Illinois and is interred in Maple Hill Cemetery, in Charlotte, Michigan.

U.S. House of Representatives
Preceded by Jonas H. McGowan	United States Representative for the 3rd congressional district of Michigan; 1881 – 1885	Succeeded by James O'Donnell
Party political offices
Preceded by Henry P. Baldwin	Chairman of the Michigan Republican Party; 1882– 1884	Succeeded by Philip T. Van Zile
Political offices
Preceded by William L. Trenholm	7th Comptroller of the Currency; May 1, 1889 - June 30, 1892	Succeeded by A. Barton Hepburn
