= Ludwig Nohl =

German writer and musicologist (1831–1885)

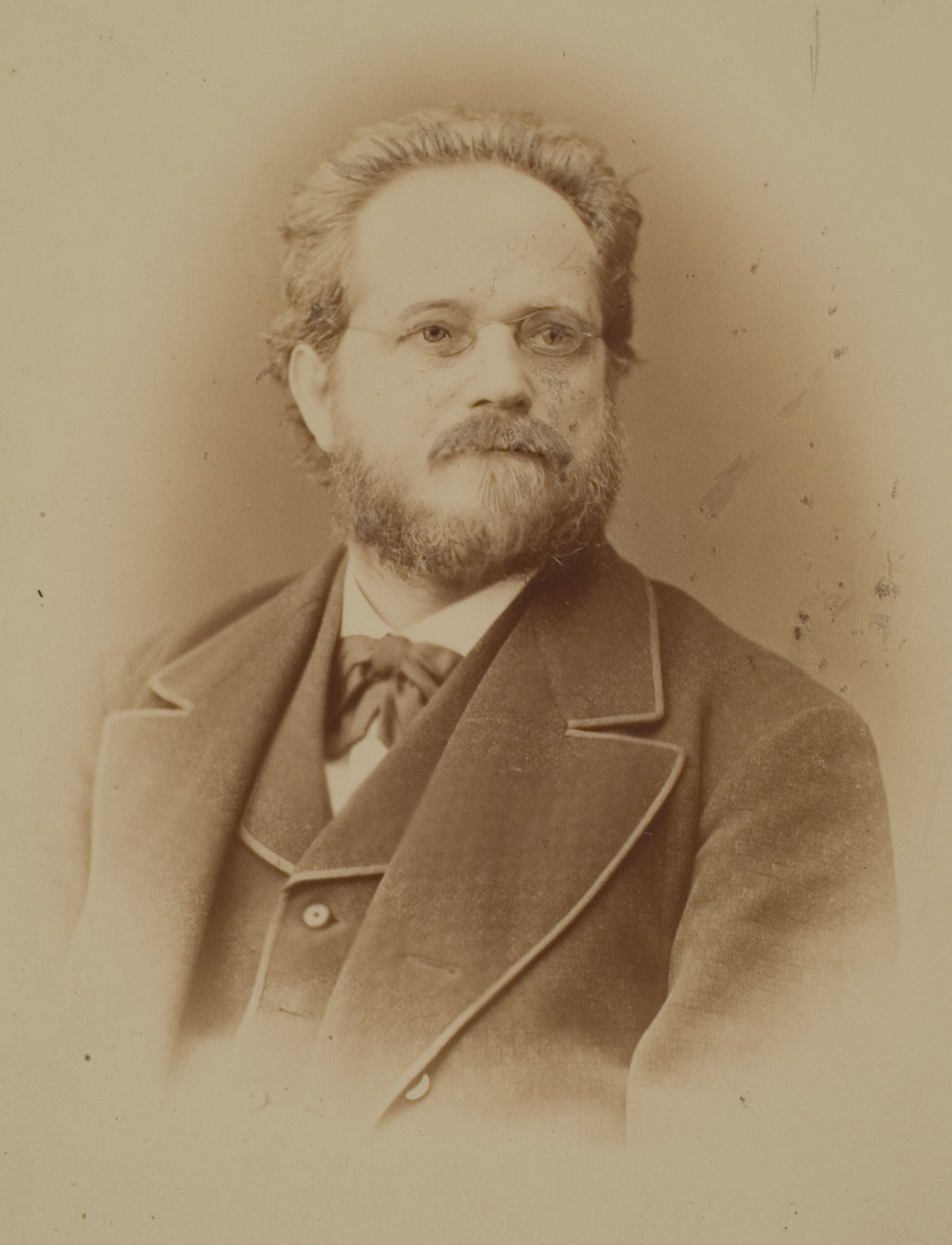
- Portrait of Ludwig Nohl, c. 1870
- Born: Ludwig Karl Friedrich Nohl; 5 December 1831; Iserlohn, Germany
- Died: 15 December 1885 (aged 54); Heidelberg, Germany
- Occupations: Writer; musicologist

Ludwig Karl Friedrich Nohl (5 December 1831, Iserlohn – 15 December 1885, Heidelberg) was a German writer and musicologist best known for discovering and publishing Beethoven's famous bagatelle, "Für Elise".

== Life ==
After graduation from the Gymnasium in Duisburg, Nohl studied jurisprudence at the University of Bonn, Heidelberg University, and the Friedrich Wilhelm University of Berlin, where he received instruction in music from Siegfried Dehn and Friedrich Kiel. From 1853 to 1856, he was a referendary and undertook journeys to France and Italy, and he also taught music in Heidelberg. In 1860, he wrote his thesis on Mozart and was habilitated to the rank of privatdozent for "History and Aesthetic of Musical Art."

In 1864, he moved to Munich and made an introduction to Richard Wagner, whose works he had praised in his writings. In 1865, he was awarded by King Ludwig II the title of Professor of Music at the Ludwig-Maximilians-Universität München for his compilation of Mozart's letters. The university faculty, however, was disinclined to Nohl, and he was not given any teaching duties. In that year, he discovered through the "industrial teacher" Babeth Bredl in Munich the now-lost autograph of Beethoven's Bagatelle "Für Elise". The work was first published in 1867 in Nohl's book "New Beethoven Letters" (Neue Briefe Beethovens).

From 1868 to 1872, he lived in Badenweiler and eventually returned to Heidelberg. In 1875, he was a lecturer at the polytechnic in Karlsruhe (predecessor to the Karlsruhe Institute of Technology) and became a full professor in 1880.

He was one of the most widely read writers on music of his time. His many books went through many printings. His main legacy is as a Beethoven scholar, and a portion of his writings are housed at the state archive in Iserlohn.
