= Cyclopaedia of Political Science, Political Economy, and the Political History of the United States =

Encyclopedia edited by John Joseph Lalor

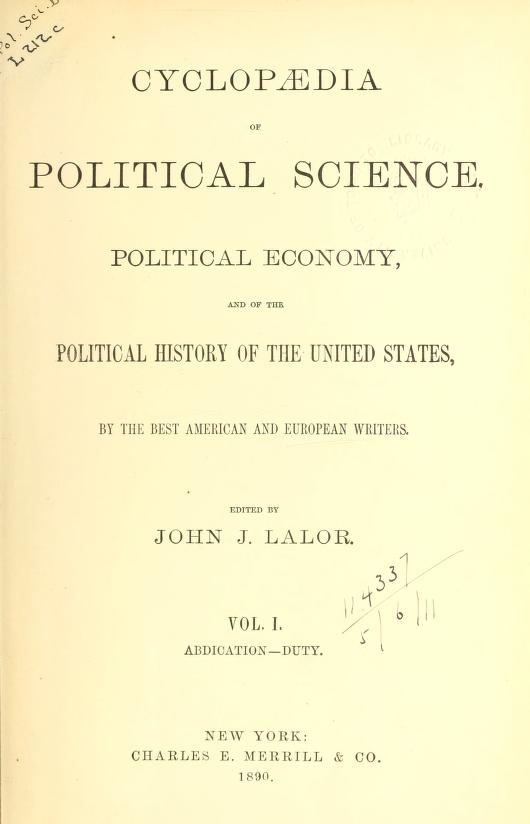
- Author: J. J. Lalor
- Publication date: 1890

The Cyclopaedia of Political Science, Political Economy, and the Political History of the United States by the Best American and European Writers was an encyclopedia edited by John Joseph Lalor, first published in New York City in 1881 by Maynard, Merrill and Co. Its contents are in the public domain.
