= William V. N. Barlow House =

Historic house in New York, United States

- U.S. National Register of Historic Places
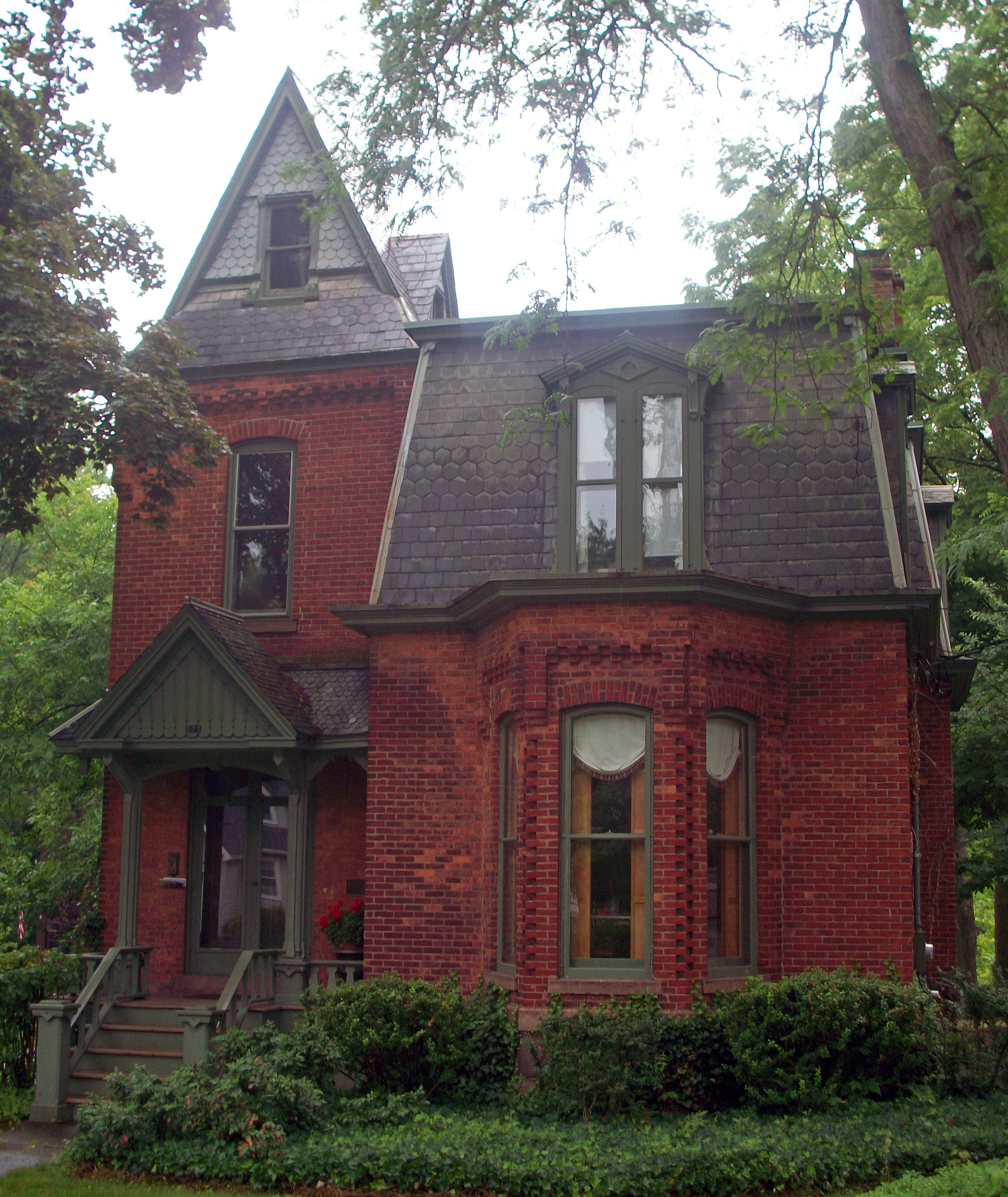
- West elevation, 2010

- Location within New York Location within the United States
- Location: Albion, NY
- Nearest city: Batavia
- Coordinates: 43°14′22″N 78°11′47″W
- Area: 1 acre (0.40 ha)
- Built: 1875
- Architect: William V. N. Barlow
- Architectural style: Second Empire, Italianate, Queen Anne
- NRHP reference No.: 83001757
- Added to NRHP: September 8, 1983

The William V. N. Barlow House is on South Clinton Street in Albion, New York, United States. It is a brick building erected in the 1870s in an eclectic mix of contemporary architectural styles, including Second Empire, Italianate, and Queen Anne. Its interior features highly intricate Eastlake style woodwork.

It was the home of a prominent local architect who designed many major buildings in Albion. In 1983 it and an accompanying barn, since converted into a garage, were added to the National Register of Historic Places. It is one of two houses in Albion so designated (the other is the Greek Revival Tousley-Church House).

== Buildings and grounds ==
The house is located on a 1-acre (0.40 ha) lot on the east side of South Clinton Street, one block south of West Avenue (state highway NY 31) and a block west of South Main Street (NY 98). The terrain is generally level. The surrounding neighborhood is residential, with many late 19th- and early 20th-century houses that retain less integrity. To the north and west are industrial areas. A woodlot separates the houses on Clinton from those on South Main to the east.

The building itself is a two-story brick structure on a Medina sandstone foundation. On the west (front) facade is a projecting pavilion with two-and-half-story tower. It is topped with a mansard roof pierced by gabled dormer windows. There are porches on the north and east sides.

On the north side the porch features turned posts and a decorative balustrade. The plainer east porch has wooden columns. Near it a gabled hood with scalloped edges shelters the rear entrance.

A similar but more decorative porch shelters the main entrance at the base of the tower. It has a gabled hood with return projecting from a shed roof above an elliptical arch with keystone. Two turned wooden fluted columns support the arch. From them project two brackets with drop pendants, supporting the gable. The base has latticework and more turned columns supporting the porch deck.

Above the main entrance is another window similar to those on the projecting bays, then a steeply pitched cross-gabled roof with a window in the west field. The dormer windows feature pediments with molded circular and diamond motifs. On the south side the chimney is corbeled at the roofline.

Double walnut doors lead to the interior, with much of its original Eastlake style woodwork. Most prominent among this is the main staircase, also of walnut, with turned balusters. A large two-tone newel has a niche for a gas light and intricate carvings in a floral pattern. The gas fireplace has a walnut frontispiece with more floral carvings, geometric forms and an intricate cast iron grill. The inside of the front bay, in the living room, has louvered shutters and decorative surrounds. That room, the central hall and stair hall all have vertical beadboard wainscoting. Walnut sliding doors separate the living and dining room.

In the rear of the house is one of the few remaining water wells, with hand pump, left in Albion. At the end of the driveway, near the rear of the property, is the former horse barn, now a garage, the other contributing resource to the property's historic character. It is a one-and-a-half-story frame gabled structure with exposed rafter ends, sided in clapboard with vertical flushboard between the two floors. Its front gable window has a pedimented hood with cut-out design, and the side windows have uneven panes.

== History ==
Shortly after his 1810 birth in Madison County, Barlow's parents moved the family west to the Monroe County town of Sweden. After apprenticing to a carpenter in Brockport, he moved to Albion in 1833 and began his career as architect and builder. Over the next half-century, he designed some of the village's most significant buildings, such as the Swan Library and the county courthouse, earning the nickname "High-Rickety" for the many cupolas on them. He also the chapel and entry archway to Mt. Albion Cemetery outside the village, also listed on the National Register. The significant buildings in Albion that he did not design, he built.

His own house was built in the later phase of his career, around 1873. His earlier works had been solidly within their stylistic traditions, in contrast to the eclecticism demonstrated by the house. It has touches from three common styles of the time: an engaged square Italianate tower, a Second Empire mansard roof and a Queen Anne Style projecting polygonal bay. The exterior and, especially, the interior, reflect a love of surface decoration as espoused in the works of Charles Eastlake.

The house has remained a private home since his death in 1909. At some point in the ensuing years the wood cresting and finials were removed from the roof and dormers. The original walnut doors between most of the rooms on the first floor were replaced with French doors in the 1920s. Five decades later, in 1975, the woodshed was converted into a family room using materials similar to the original house. The only other change to the property has been the replacement of wood with cement on the garage floor.

== See also ==
- National Register of Historic Places listings in Orleans County, New York
