= Harvey Goodrich =

Harvey Goodrich (November 19, 1792 – August 4, 1863) was an American merchant and postmaster from New York.

== Life ==
Goodrich was born in Herkimer County, New York in 1792, one of seven children born to Zenas and Esther Goodrich. As a young man he removed to Auburn in Cayuga County, New York where he worked as a hat maker. Goodrich entered into a partnership with his brother-in-law George W. Standart and the two men engaged in work on the Erie Canal until 1824. Upon completion of that work, he relocated to Albion in Orleans County, New York where he opened a dry goods and grocery business known as Goodrich & Standart. Following the death of Standart on October 3, 1827, the partnership was dissolved, effectively ending Goodrich's interests in the dry goods business. He quickly partnered with his brother, Harmon Goodrich, and established the firm of H. & H. Goodrich dealing in hats and furs.

During his time in Auburn, he aligned himself with the Presbyterian Church at that location in 1817. Upon his arrival at Albion, he sought the assistance of Rev. William Johnson of the Auburn Theological Seminary to establish the a church for congregants in the area. Around February 22, 1824, the First Presbyterian Church of Albion was established with the assistance of Rev. Andrew Rawson with a membership of 16 individuals. On July 26, 1824, he was elected as a ruling elder in the church and although he was never formally selected, he was always known as "Deacon Goodrich." On March 5, 1836, the Orleans County Board of Supervisors were authorized to raise $2,000 for the purpose of erecting a fireproof clerk's office. In the earliest days of Orleans County, the records of the county clerk were kept in the basement and a committee consisting of Abraham Mills, Lorenzo Burrows, and Goodrich were appointed to select a site for a new building. That building, once completed, was used until 1882 when the current Surrogate's Office was erected on the same site at Courthouse Square in Albion.

On July 6, 1860, he was appointed to serve as deputy postmaster of Albion after the removal of J. O. Wilson and was subsequently nominated by James Buchanan to remain in that position on December 6, 1860. He was replaced by Charles A. Harrington in 1861. It was around this time that Goodrich suffered a stroke that left him paralyzed for nearly two years. He died on August 4, 1863, at his home in Albion and was interred in Mount Albion Cemetery.
