= Albion (village), New York =

Albion Newport
- Village
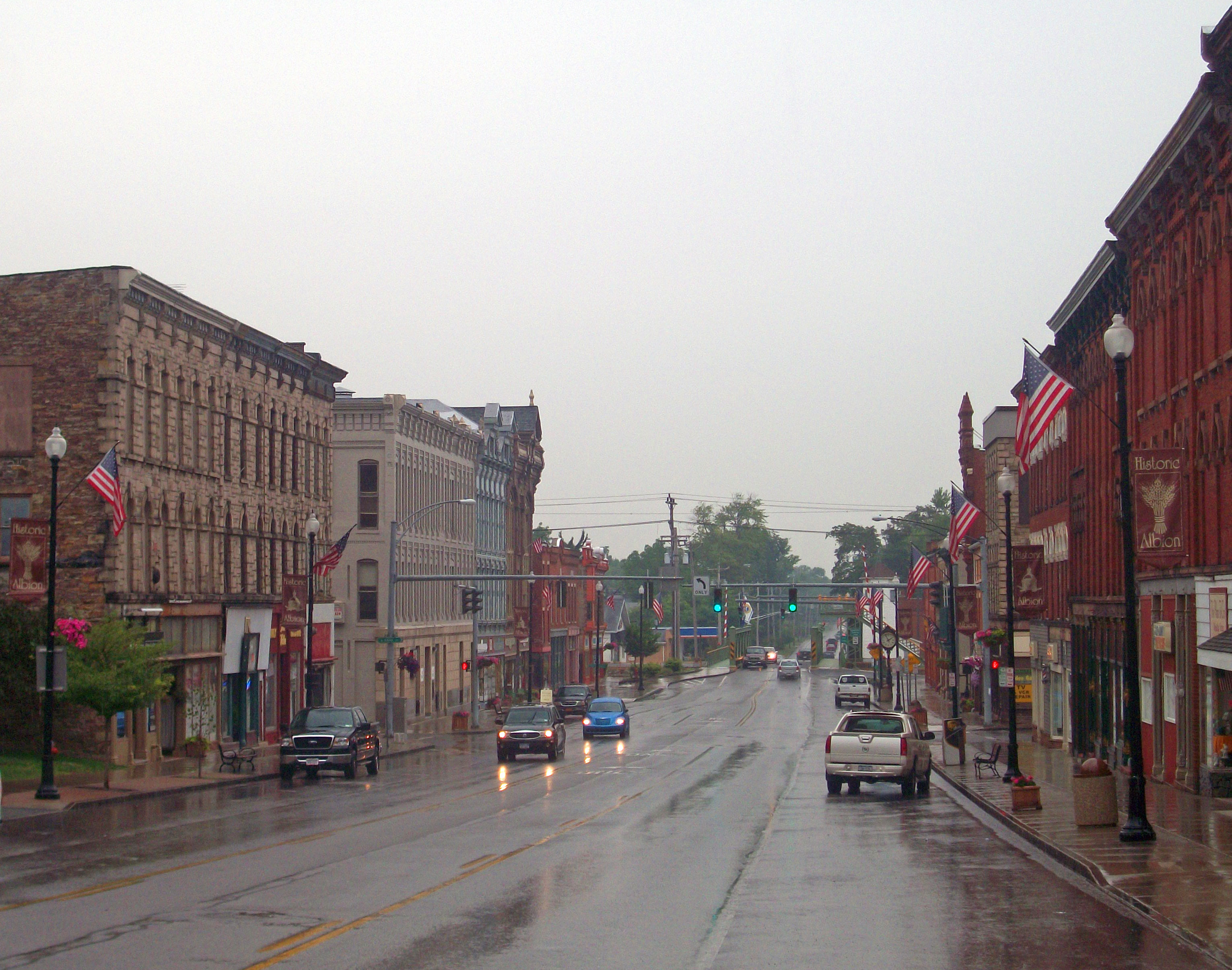
- Looking north along Main Street in downtown Albion
- Etymology: From archaic name for Great Britain
- Location in Orleans County and the state of New York.

- Location of New York in the United States
- Coordinates: 43°14′46″N 78°11′37″W
- Country: United States
- State: New York
- County: Orleans
- Settled: 1812
- Incorporated: 1828

Government
  - Type: Village Hall
  - Mayor: Tim McMurray

Area
  - Total: 2.92 sq mi (7.56 km^{2})
  - Land: 2.92 sq mi (7.56 km^{2})
  - Water: 0 sq mi (0.00 km^{2})
- Elevation: 540 ft (160 m)
- Highest elevation (Two areas near S boundary): 600 ft (180 m)
- Lowest elevation (Former quarries N of St. Joseph's Cemetery): 440 ft (130 m)

Population (2020)
  - Total: 5,637
  - Density: 1,930.8/sq mi (745.47/km^{2})
- Time zone: UTC-5 (EST)
  - Summer (DST): UTC-4 (EDT)
- ZIP code: 14411
- Area code: 585
- FIPS code: 36-01033
- GNIS feature ID: 2391504
- Wikimedia Commons: Albion, New York
- Website: vil.albion.ny.us

Albion is a village in Orleans County, New York, United States. The population was 5,637 as of the 2020 census, down 419 from the 2010 census. The village is centrally located in the county, and is partly within the towns of both Albion and Gaines. It is the county seat of Orleans County and is about 30 miles (48 km) west/northwest of Rochester. Albion is part of the Rochester metropolitan area.

== History ==
The Albion area was first settled by European Americans in 1812. This area attracted few residents before the announcement, near the end of the decade, that the Erie Canal would be constructed through here. In 1822, an entrepreneur named Nehemiah Ingersoll bought much of the land near the planned intersection of the canal and Oak Orchard Road, the main north–south route through the area at the time. The property was soon subdivided, and the village, then known as Newport, began to grow.

Orleans County was created two years later. State officials considered both Gaines (then more populous) and Newport as the county seat due to their central locations within the new county. They chose Newport in 1826 due to its location on the canal and the West Branch of Sandy Creek, where a mill had already been established. The next year the village changed its name to Albion to avoid postal confusion with New York's other Newport, in Oneida County. In 1828 it was incorporated as a village.

The William V. N. Barlow House, North Main–Bank Streets Historic District, Orleans County Courthouse Historic District, Tousley-Church House, and United States Post Office are listed on the National Register of Historic Places.

== Government ==
=== Village of Albion Board of Trustees ===
Office	Officeholder	Party
Mayor	Tim McMurray	Republican
Deputy Mayor	William Gabalski	Independent
Trustee	Kevin Sheehan	Republican
Trustee	Gregory Bennett	Democrat
Trustee	Jami Allport	Republican

The village elected a president. The following list is of those who held office.

Village of Albion Presidents

No.	Name	Tenure
1	Alexis Ward	1829-1830
2	Henry R. Curtis	1831-1832
3	Harvey Goodrich	1833-1836
4	Benjamin Bessac	1837
5	Jonathan Elkins	1838
6	Benjamin Bessac	1839
7	Arad Thomas	1840-1842
8	Henry A. King	1843-1846
9	George H. Stone	1847-1848
10	Joseph M. Cornell	1849
11	Charles H. Moore	1850
12	Henry J. Sickels	1851
13	Joseph M. Cornell	1852-1853
14	John H. White	1854-1855
15	Henry L. Achilles	1856
16	Henry Sears	1857
17	Arad Thomas	1858
18	Henry J. Sickels	1859
19	Walker Mattison	1860
20	Roswell Clark	1861
21	Henry A. King	1862-1863
22	John N. Proctor	1864
23	H. J. Van Deusen	1865-1866
24	Charles H. Moore	1867
25	Edwin Porter	1868
26	Seth L. King	1869
27	Henry A. King	1870
28	John N. Proctor	1871
29	John Bidleman	1872
30	John H. White	1873-1874
31	George S. Hutchinson	1875
32	George M. Waterman	1876
33	H. J. Danforth	1877
34	David Young	1878

The new village charter changed the term of president from one year to three years starting in 1879.

No.	Name	Tenure
35	John N. Proctor	1879-1881
36	William B. Dye	1882-1890
37	H. Eugene English	1891-1896
38	George W. Ough	1897-1902
39	Herbert J. Bailey	1903-1905
40	Perry W. Church	1906-1908
41	William B. Dye	1909-1914
43	Schuyler Hazard	1915-1917
44	Fred Rhodey	1918-1923
44	Daniel W. Hanley Sr.	1924-1932
45	Jacob Landauer	1933-1941
46	Francis H. Blake Sr.	1942-1947
47	Arnold W. Holliday	1948-1950

According to a new village charter, the name of the head of the village was changed from "president" to "mayor" starting in June 1951.

Village of Albion Mayors

No.	Name	Tenure
48	William A. Monacelli	1951-1953
49	John D. Robinson	1954-1956
50	Leonard J. Rice*	1957-1959
51	James J. Hunt	1959-1960
52	John D. Robinson	1960-1965
53	William A. Monacelli	1966-1972
54	Jacob Glassner**	1972-1973
55	Donna Rodden	1973-1983
56	J. Donald Brace	1984-1986
57	Joseph Sacco***	1986-1991
58	David Albanese	1991-1998
59	Edward Salvatore	1998-2005
60	Michael Haddick****	2005-2009
61	Kevin Sheehan	2009-2010
62	Dean Theodorakos	2010-2014
63	Dean London	2014-2018
64	Eileen Banker	2018-2022
65	Angel Javier Jr.	2022-2026
66	Tim McMurray	2026-

* Resigned as mayor to fill vacancy of village clerk-treasurer.

** Filled vacancy created by death of William A. Monacelli in June 1972.

*** Resigned position as Mayor in September 1991.

**** Resigned from position as Mayor.

== Geography ==
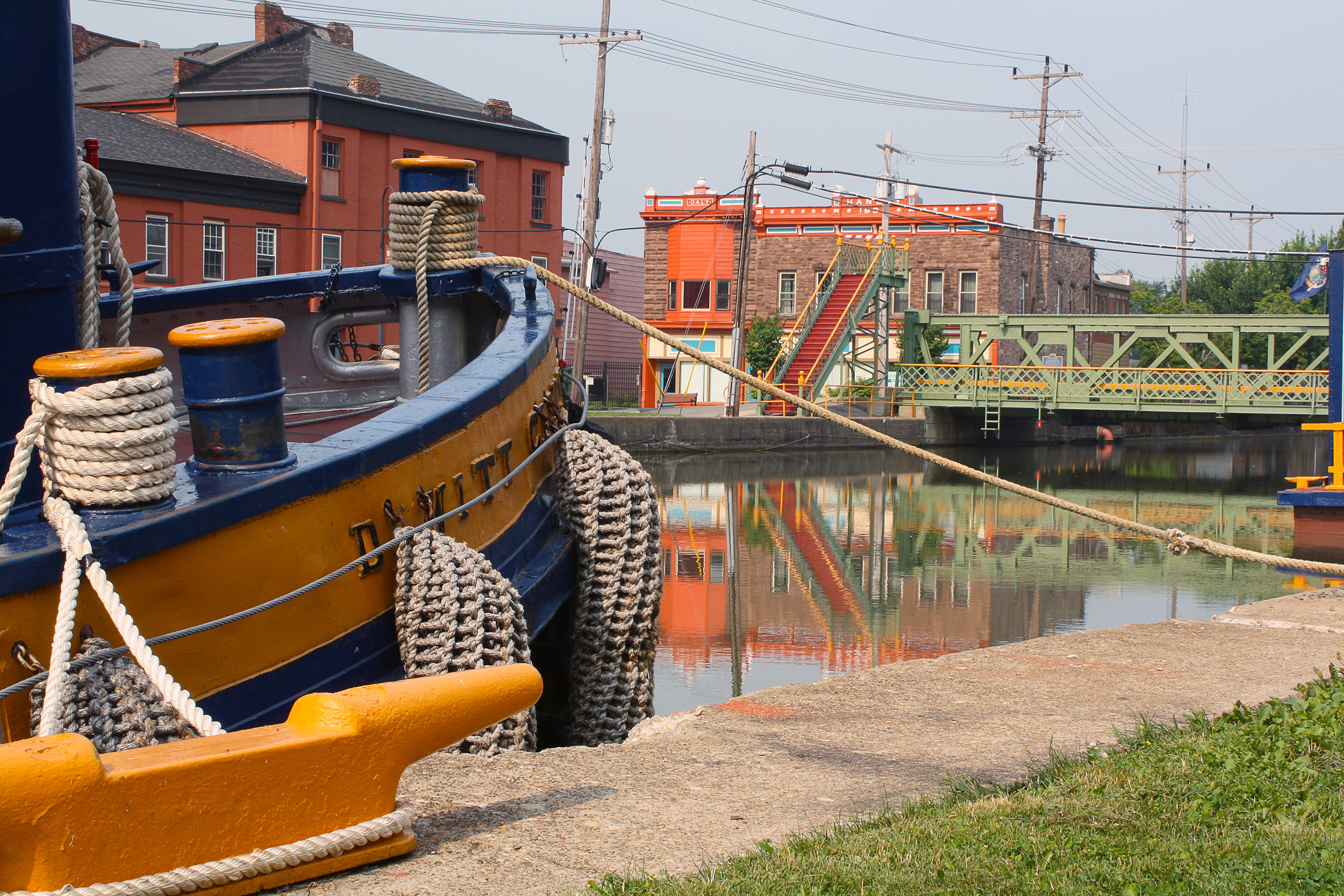
Tugboat and lift bridge on the Erie Canal in Albion

Albion is located at 43°14′49″N 78°11′28″W (43.247211, -78.191264).

According to the United States Census Bureau, the village has a total area of 3.0 square miles (7.7 km^{2}), all land.

The Erie Canal passes through the community.

Albion is the site of the junction of east–west highway NYS Route 31 (East Avenue and West Avenue) and north–south highway NYS Route 98 (Main Street). NYS Route 279 joins NY-98 immediately north of Albion.

It is located 30 miles west of Rochester NY, and 43 miles northeast of Buffalo NY, in addition to being 16 miles north of Batavia NY.

== Demographics ==
Historical population
Census	Pop.	Note	%±
1850	2,251		—
1860	2,970		31.9%
1870	3,322		11.9%
1890	4,586		—
1900	4,477		−2.4%
1910	5,016		12.0%
1920	4,683		−6.6%
1930	4,878		4.2%
1940	4,660		−4.5%
1950	4,850		4.1%
1960	5,182		6.8%
1970	5,122		−1.2%
1980	4,897		−4.4%
1990	5,863		19.7%
2000	7,438		26.9%
2010	6,056		−18.6%
2020	5,637		−6.9%
U.S. Decennial Census

As of the census of 2000, there were 7,438 people, 2,307 households, and 1,444 families residing in the village. The population density was 2,501.8 inhabitants per square mile (966.0/km^{2}). There were 2,566 housing units at an average density of 863.1 per square mile (333.2/km^{2}). The racial makeup of the village was 73.88% White, 18.20% African American, 0.69% Native American, 0.58% Asian, 0.08% Pacific Islander, 4.99% from other races, and 1.59% from two or more races. Hispanic or Latino of any race were 9.32% of the population.

There were 2,307 households, out of which 34.7% had children under the age of 18 living with them, 39.8% were married couples living together, 17.2% had a female householder with no husband present, and 37.4% were non-families. 30.6% of all households were made up of individuals, and 14.0% had someone living alone who was 65 years of age or older. The average household size was 2.54 and the average family size was 3.14.

In the village, the population was spread out, with 23.3% under the age of 18, 11.0% from 18 to 24, 37.3% from 25 to 44, 17.1% from 45 to 64, and 11.2% who were 65 years of age or older. The median age was 33 years. For every 100 females, there were 141.9 males. For every 100 females age 18 and over, there were 150.6 males.

The median income for a household in the village was $30,010, and the median income for a family was $34,881. Males had a median income of $31,660 versus $22,157 for females. The per capita income for the village was $13,531. About 13.0% of families and 14.9% of the population were below the poverty line, including 18.5% of those under age 18 and 8.7% of those age 65 or over.

== Education ==
- Albion Central School District.

== Public transportation ==
Public transportation in Albion is provided by the OTS, which is part of the Rochester Genesee Regional Transportation Authority (RGRTA).

== Economy ==
- Albion is a trading and shipping village for a good farming region; the primary commodity crops are apples, cabbages and beans. Albion also had several Medina Sandstone quarries.

== Notable people ==
- Grace Bedell, (1848–1936), suggested in 1860 (aged 11) that Abraham Lincoln grow a beard.
- Sanford E. Church, (1815–1880), born in Albion, politician who became Lieutenant Governor of New York, New York State Comptroller, and Chief Judge of New York State Court of Appeals.
- Dan H. Cole, (1811-1881), politician and former New York State Senator.
- Tommy Colella, (1918-1992), retired pro football player.
- John Chamberlain Collins, (1850-1928), influential Christian social worker of the 19th century, believed to be the boy present for the execution of conspirators connected to the Lincoln assassination in 1865.
- John Cunneen, (1848–1907), Irish immigrant and attorney, New York State Attorney General.
- Noah Davis, (1818-1902), politician and jurist, former US Congressman, New York State Supreme Court Justice.
- Elizabeth H. Denio, PhD, (1842-1922), born at Albion, professor at Vassar College and Wellesley College, organizer of Rochester's Memorial Art Gallery.
- Gilbert De La Matyr, (1825-1892), former US Congressman from Indiana, lived in Albion during the 1850s and 1860s.
- Geoffrey Giuliano,(1953– ), author, actor and syndicated radio show host; lived on and off in Albion from his birth until the age of twenty three.
- Henry Moore Harrington, (1849-1876), born at Albion, West Point Military Academy graduate, member of 7th US Cavalry killed at Battle of Little Bighorn.
- Elizur K. Hart, (1841–1893), born in Albion, founder of newspaper Rochester Post-Express, and elected as United States Congressman from New York.
- Charles H. Holmes, (1827–1874), born in Albion, United States Congressman from New York.
- Charles W. Howard, (1896–1966), portrayed Santa Claus.
- Derek Kinder, (1986– ), football player, NCAA College Football standout for Pitt. Drafted by Chicago Bears as a Compensatory selection in the 2009 NFL Draft.
- Charles H. Nesbitt, (1947– ), decorated Vietnam veteran and politician, former NYS Assemblyman and NYS Assembly Minority Leader of the Republican Party, current president of the NYS Division of Tax Appeals and Tax Appeals Tribunal.
- Don Sisson, (1979– ), White House Staffer for President Barack H. Obama
- Daniel H. Pinney, (1837-1921), lawyer and jurist.
- Henry "Hank" Porter, (1900-1951), born in Albion, artist for Walt Disney and credited with creating more than 1,200 drawings during World War Two that were related to the war effort.
- George Pullman, (1831–1897), sleeper car magnate, Chicago businessman, lived in Albion with his family for some time. Built the Pullman Memorial Universalist Church at 10 East Park Street (1894) in memory of his parents.
- Edwin R. Reynolds, (1816-1908), former US Congressman.
- Benjamin Titus Roberts, (1823-1893), founder of the Free Methodist Church of North America, minister at Albion during the mid-1850s.
- John G. Sawyer, (1825-1898), last US Congressman elected from Orleans County.
- Loren Stiles, (1826-1863), founder of the first Congregational Free Methodist Church in 1859.
