= Arad Thomas =

American lawyer, judge and author

Arad Thomas (November 18, 1807 – June 24, 1889) was an American lawyer, judge, and writer. He was Deputy Secretary of State of Vermont in 1831, President of the Village of Albion from 1840 to 1843, and Surrogate and Judge of Orleans County from 1860 to 1864. He wrote the history book Pioneer History of Orleans County, New York.

== Life ==
Thomas was born in Woodstock, Vermont in 1807. He remained on the family farm until the age of 17 years when he started his pursuit of higher education, graduating from Union College in 1830.

At the age of 24 he became Deputy Secretary of State for Vermont in 1831 before removing to Gaines, Orleans County, New York the following year. Upon his arrival he began the study of law under the Hon. William W. Ruggles of Gaines before his admittance to the bar. In 1836 he relocated several miles south to the village of Albion where he practiced law. He was elected to the position of President of the Village of Albion in 1840 and was reelected twice. While in this capacity, he and Lorenzo Burrows were tasked with drafting amendments to the village charter in 1842 to allow for the establishment of Mount Albion Cemetery. His work resulted in a complete revision of the charter, approved on April 1, 1842. After his completion of three terms as village president, he was elected to the position of justice of the peace in 1843 and remained in that position for eight years. He was elected as Surrogate and Judge of Orleans County in 1860 and remained in that position until 1864.

His most notable accomplishment came in 1871 with the publication of his book entitled Pioneer History of Orleans County, New York, a seminal work on the early history of the county. In 1873 his commitment to the African-American population in Albion culminated in the establishment of the A.M.E. Church located on Ingersoll Street north of the Erie Canal. He was passionate about the preservation of local history and aided in the establishment of the first museum in Orleans County, situated within a log cabin constructed on the old fair grounds on the western boundary of Albion. He was also active in the Orleans County Pioneer Association, an organization committed to the preservation of the earliest settlers of Orleans County.

Thomas was married three times, first to Mary Udall (February 2, 1812 – June 16, 1856), then to Harriet Ellsworth, and finally to Eliza Parsons Herrick.

Thomas died on June 24, 1889, in Albion, New York.
