= Freeman Clarke =

American politician

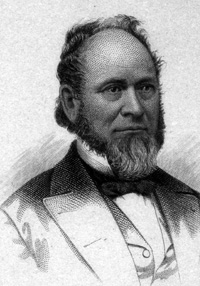

Member of the U.S. House of Representatives from New York
- In office March 4, 1871 – March 3, 1875
- Preceded by: Charles H. Holmes
- Succeeded by: Charles C. B. Walker
- Constituency: 28th district (1871–73); 29th district (1873–75)
- In office March 4, 1863 – March 3, 1865
- Preceded by: Robert B. Van Valkenburgh
- Succeeded by: Roswell Hart
- Constituency: 28th district

2nd Comptroller of the Currency
- In office March 9, 1865 – July 24, 1866
- President: Abraham Lincoln; Andrew Johnson
- Preceded by: Hugh McCulloch
- Succeeded by: Hiland R. Hulburd

Personal details
- Born: March 22, 1809 Troy, New York
- Died: June 24, 1887 (aged 78) Rochester, New York
- Party: Republican

Freeman Clarke (March 22, 1809 – June 24, 1887) was a U.S. representative from New York during the American Civil War.

Born in Troy, New York, Clarke went into business for himself at the age of fifteen. He began his financial career as cashier of the Bank of Orleans, Albion, New York. He moved to Rochester, New York, in 1845.

He became director and president of banks, railroads, and telegraph and trust companies of Rochester and New York City, and later served as delegate to the Whig National Convention at Baltimore in 1852 and as vice president of the first Republican State convention of New York in 1854.

He served as delegate to the State constitutional convention in 1867.

Clarke was elected as a Republican to the Thirty-eighth Congress (March 4, 1863 – March 3, 1865). He was Comptroller of the Currency from March 9, 1865, to February 6, 1867.

Clarke was again elected to the Forty-second and Forty-third Congresses (March 4, 1871 – March 3, 1875).

He died in Rochester, New York, on June 24, 1887, and was interred at Mount Hope Cemetery, Rochester, NY.

Political offices
Preceded by Hugh McCulloch	Comptroller of the Currency; 1865–1867	Succeeded by Hiland R. Hulburd
U.S. House of Representatives
Preceded by Robert B. Van Valkenburgh	Member of the U.S. House of Representatives from New York's 28th congressional district 1863-1865	Succeeded by Roswell Hart
Preceded by Charles H. Holmes	Member of the U.S. House of Representatives from New York's 28th congressional district 1871-1873	Succeeded by Horace B. Smith
Preceded by Seth Wakeman	Member of the U.S. House of Representatives from New York's 29th congressional district 1873–1875	Succeeded by Charles C. B. Walker
