= Jennie Cannon =

Jennie Cannon may refer to:

- Jennie V. Cannon, American artist
- Jennie Curtis Cannon, American suffragist
