= Hulburd =

Hulburd is a surname. Notable people with the surname include:

- Benjamin N. Hulburd (1898–1964), American attorney, politician, and judge
- Calvin T. Hulburd (1809–1897), American politician
- Hiland R. Hulburd (1829–1880), American government official
- Roger W. Hulburd (1856–1944), American lawyer and politician
