= Denio =

Denio can refer to:

== People ==
- Amy Denio (born 1961), soundtrack composer and songwriter
- Elizabeth Denio (1842–1922), American teacher, first woman to teach at the University of Rochester
- Hiram Denio (1799–1871), American lawyer and politician, Chief Judge of the New York Court of Appeals
- Dênio Martins (born 1977), Brazilian footballer
- Denio Canton (1919-2005), Cuban professional baseball pitcher

== See also ==
- Samfundet De Nio, Swedish literary society
