= Orleans Correctional Facility =

Medium-security state prison for male prisoners, located in New York, US

Coordinates: 43°14′38″N 78°13′14″W

- Interactive map of Orleans Correctional Facility
- Location: 35-31 Gaines Basin Road Albion, New York
- Status: open
- Security class: medium
- Capacity: 1082
- Opened: 1986
- Managed by: New York State Department of Corrections and Community Supervision

The Orleans Correctional Facility is a state prison in New York, United States. OCF is a medium security prison for males and is located in the Town of Albion, Orleans County in Western New York.

It is located near the Albion Correctional Facility.
