= Charles W. Howard =

American famous for portraying Santa (1896–1966)

Charles Willis Howard (June 15, 1896 – May 1, 1966) was an American actor and teacher most famous for portraying Santa Claus in department stores and parades. In 1937, he established the Charles W. Howard Santa Claus School which today is the oldest continuously-run Santa school in the world.

== Early life ==
To say there is no Santa Claus is the most erroneous statement in the world. Santa Claus is a thought that is passed from generation to generation. After time this thought takes on a human form. Maybe if all children and adults understand the symbolism of this thought we can actually attain Peace on Earth and good will to men everywhere.

— Charles W. Howard

Howard was born in Albion, New York to William Asa Howard and Martha Haight. As a young boy, his aunt gave him a coping saw and he showed exceptional creative ability. At the age of seven, he used the tool to fashion toy furniture and wagons that friends and neighbors purchased for gifts. Around this time, Howard's mother sewed a Santa Claus suit for him, as he was a "short fat boy." He was given a "false face" and as a result, was deemed quite proficient in playing the role of Santa. Although his blue eyes were always merry, the false face frightened fellow children and he stopped wearing it.

=== First Santa Claus role ===
As he grew older, Howard observed other men portraying Santa Claus in local stores and decided that he would like to attempt this as well. After he finished his farm chores one day, he ventured downtown to John B. Merrill's Furniture Store and suggested they hire him to play Santa. Merrill suggested that Howard set up shop in the storefront window to manufacture toys. Although Howard did not like the window idea, he agreed to the job at $15.00 per week. He constructed a workbench and provide his own tools to complete the work. As he worked in the front window, a line of children would gather to watch Santa make toys, giving him time to interact with the observers. Howard would wake early in the morning to complete his farm chores, take several cans of milk to a dealer in town, then don his Santa suit until noon. He would then venture home, eat a quick lunch, complete his noon farm chores, and hurry back to the store for more work as Santa.

=== Automobile accident ===
One snowy morning, Howard was driving his Model T Ford, which he had converted into a pickup truck. While approaching a horse-drawn sleigh, a young boy jumped off the back and darted in front of Howard's truck. He slammed on the brakes and jerked the wheel to avoid the child, striking a curb, and overturning the vehicle. The young man let out a wail as he was knocked out of the way by the truck. Howard later remarked, "I knew if he could shout he was alive and that was more than I expected." Frightened half-to-death, he climbed out of the truck to check on the boy, who was frightened but unharmed. Bystanders quickly came to assist Howard, but when he directed them to check on the child, the boy was nowhere to be found. One of the truck wheels was crushed and the bystanders assisted him in turning the truck upright. He continued to his work at Merrill's, distraught over the incident. The friendly smiles of children placed him at ease relatively quickly. He later recalled that the only thought running through his head was the fear of newspapers running a story with the headline "SANTA KILLS BOY."

=== Santa Claus career ===
After a short time at Merrill's, Howard wrote to McCurdy's Department Store in Rochester, New York inquiring about a position as Santa Claus. When he received word that the sales manager, Mr. Carl Skare, was interested, he packed up his suit and left for Rochester. When he entered the store office dressed as Santa, Skare took one look at him and asked, "When can you start?" No other questions were asked. On his first day of work, he was so frightened that store workers could not coax him out of the dressing room. When they pounded on the door, he finally emerged quite timidly. Soon, the smiling faces of young children melted his fears away and the day passed so quickly that he forgot to break for lunch. To commute from Albion to Rochester, Howard would awake between 3:30am and 4:00am, complete his chores on the farm, and get ready for work. Then his wife would drive him to the train station. At the end of the day, he would return home to finish his chores and tumble into bed.

Knowing very little about the meaning of Santa Claus, Howard later recalled an interaction with a young child that helped him understand the true role of Santa:

One morning a little girl came in an watched him work. She stood there for some time before she ventured closer. Then a step at a time she walked up to him and very timidly asked, 'Santa, will you promise me something?' Santa looked at the child and said, 'What is it you want me to promise?' He had already learned that promises sometimes meant heartaches. He did not want to make any mistakes. However this child seemed so sincere, so earnest, he took her little hand in his. The child drew closer, looked up into his face with all the love and trust that a five year old could and whispered, 'Will you promise me you will never shave?' It wasn't what he had expected but all at once he realized that if Santa meant that much to that child it must mean just as much to hundreds of others. Who was this old fellow who meant so much to the children? Where did he come from? What did he stand for? Why did he wear that red suit? Why was it trimmed with white fur? Why this? And why that?

Howard spent years reading about the history of Santa Claus, picking up just about every book on the subject. As his knowledge increased, so did the requests from stores seeking an experienced Santa. Other men portraying Santa started to seek out his expertise, eventually leading to the development of the Santa Claus School.

== The Charles W. Howard Santa Claus School ==
Following a suggestion made by Roy Fess of the Buffalo Courier Express, Howard started the Charles W. Howard Santa Claus School in 1937. The first class consisted of three men, the first being Frederick Wise, an unmarried welder from New Jersey. The other two pupils include Howard's personal friend and a neighbor. Wise was the only pupil to pay the $15.00 tuition. The lack of success was a hard learned business lesson for Howard as store owners remarked that if a lesson on how to become Santa only cost $15.00, then it must not be worth much. Howard gradually increased the tuition, first to $25.00, then $40.00, and eventually to $50.00. As enrollment jumped to more than forty, a grocery store chain asked him to visit Chicago in order to conduct a school for their Santas.

Howard had no dedicated schoolhouse, but he remarked that "... Santa originated in the home. It was best to keep him there." So the school was conducted in Howard's home at Phipps Road and Gaines Basin Road in Albion. He convinced his wife to cook noon meals for the men. As a home economics teacher at the Western House of Refuge in Albion, she served meals that "Santa Claus-type men" enjoyed. To increase the prestige of the school, Howard sought out Charles Newton Hood of Medina, New York, an old time showman, to teach the showmanship angle of Santa Claus. Ed Butters of Coldwater, Michigan was an expert on reindeer and was called in to instruct the students on working with reindeer. Howard continued to add other experts as the school continued to grow.

Since United States took part in World War II in 1941, finding men to fill the role of Santa became increasingly difficult. Some stores selected women with deep voices to play the part. Howard recalled one woman who was quite successful until customers started complaining about Santa's visits to the ladies' restroom. In an effort to supplement his school, he created a mail order course that failed miserably. Without Howard's physical presence to instill the Christmas spirit, it would not work. Men from across the country, from the Gulf of Mexico to the Canadian border, California to the east coast, ventured to Albion for training. If one store sent their Santas to school, it was almost guaranteed that their competitors would as well. When one particular chain store in Washington, D.C. sent their Santas four straight years, Howard asked the owner why they kept sending them each year. "I can't teach them any more." The owner replied that attending the Santa Claus School energized the men with the Christmas spirit, which became infectious throughout their stores.

To add to the character of Santa, Howard designed his own suit that was "worthy of the character as he knew him." He was criticized for manufacturing an outfit that was double the price of any other and was told he would never sell them. The suits were made from the original pattern from 1937 made with French rabbit fur and had yak beards for the price of $85. By the 1960s, he was providing the biggest and best stores in the nation with Santa Suits.

In 1944, Howard left McCurdy's Department Store in Rochester and entered the employ of Adam, Meldrum & Anderson in Buffalo, New York. He remained in that role until he suffered a nervous breakdown in 1948, collapsing on the job.

From 1948 to 1965, he was the featured Santa Claus in the Macy's Thanksgiving Day Parade, perhaps the most visible Santa in the United States.

== Death and legacy ==
Howard died in 1966 near his home in Albion. Christmas Park, which had attracted 80,000 visitors yearly at its peak, closed, and his Santa Claus School was moved to Midland, Michigan.

As of 2009, the Charles W. Howard Santa Claus School continued running in Midland, Michigan, under Tom and Holly Valent, who themselves had portrayed Santa and Mrs. Claus for over thirty years. An attraction called "Santa House" is near the School and is themed as Santa's workshop.

Orleans County, New York held a special event, Charles W. Howard Day, on September 25, 2010 (three months before Christmas), with the hopes of making it a yearly event.
