= Charles H. Holmes =

American politician

Charles Horace Holmes (October 24, 1827 – October 2, 1874) was a member of the United States House of Representatives from New York.

== Life and career ==
Holmes was born in Albion, Orleans County, New York, on October 24, 1827. He attended the public schools and Albion Academy, and graduated from Albany Law School in 1854. He was admitted to the bar in 1855 and commenced practice in Albion.

He was elected as a Republican to the Forty-first Congress to fill the vacancy caused by the resignation of Noah Davis and served from December 6, 1870, to March 3, 1871; he was not a candidate for renomination. He resumed the practice of law in Albion. He died on October 2, 1874, and was interred in Mount Albion Cemetery.

U.S. House of Representatives
Preceded by Noah Davis	Member of the U.S. House of Representatives from New York's 28th congressional district 1870–1871	Succeeded by Freeman Clarke
