= Henry W. Cannon =

Comptroller of the United States from 1884 to 1886

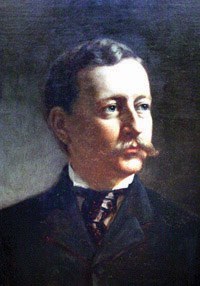

President of Chase National Bank of New York
- In office 1886 – February 1904
- Preceded by: John Thompson
- Succeeded by: A. Barton Hepburn

5th Comptroller of the Currency
- In office May 12, 1884 - March 1, 1886
- President: Chester A. Arthur; Grover Cleveland
- Preceded by: John Jay Knox
- Succeeded by: William L. Trenholm

Personal details
- Born: Henry White Cannon; September 27, 1850 Delhi, New York, U.S.
- Died: April 27, 1934 (aged 83) Daytona Beach, Florida, U.S.
- Spouses: Jennie O. Curtis (m. 1879; died 1929) Myrta L. Jones (m. 1930)
- Parent(s): George Bliss Cannon; Ann Eliza White
- Education: Delaware Literary Institute

Henry White Cannon (September 27, 1850 – April 27, 1934) was a United States Comptroller of the Currency from 1884 to 1886.

== Early life ==
Cannon was born in Delhi, New York, on September 27, 1850. He was the son of George Bliss Cannon (d. 1890), the postmaster of Delhi during the Grant administration who was a close personal friend of Horace Greeley, and Ann Eliza (née White) Cannon. His brother was James Graham Cannon (b. 1858), also a prominent banker in New York, was married to Charlotte Baldwin Bradley.

His paternal grandfather, Benjamin Persis Cannon (b. 1776), was born in Hebron, Connecticut, and later moved to Tompkins, New York which was later renamed Cannonsville, New York, in his honor. Through his mother's family, he was a direct descendant of Peregrine White, the first known English child born to the Pilgrims in America, who was born in 1620 aboard the Mayflower in harbor at Cape Cod.

== Career ==
Cannon studied at the Delaware Literary Institute, then became a clerk and teller in the First National Bank in Delhi. In 1870, he moved to St. Paul, Minnesota, where he became a teller in the Second National Bank. A year later, the 21 year old Cannon organized the Lumberman's National Bank at Stillwater and served as president for thirteen years.

=== Government service ===
In 1884, Cannon was appointed Comptroller by President Chester A. Arthur to succeed John Jay Knox. (Note: The Office of the Comptroller of the Currency is an independent bureau within the United States Department of the Treasury that was established by the National Currency Act of 1863 and serves to charter, regulate, and supervise all national banks and thrift institutions and the federal branches and agencies of foreign banks in the United States.) After only a few months in office, he was confronted by the financial panic of 1884. Due to Cannon's efforts, the crisis was averted because the New York Clearing House Association quickly extended credit to threatened banks. After Grover Cleveland was elected president, Cleveland requested he stay in his role, however, Cannon resigned and William L. Trenholm was appointed to succeed him.

In 1892, Cannon was a delegate to the 4th International Monetary Conference held in Brussels.

=== Banking and railroads ===
After resigning from the government, Cannon moved to New York City and joined the National Bank of the Republic as vice-president where his predecessor Comptroller, John Jay Knox, served as president.

Cannon was associated with James J. Hill, who bought control of Chase National Bank of New York in 1886. Cannon was later elected as the second president of the Bank, succeeding John Thompson, who founded the bank in 1877. In February 1904, he became chairman of the board, and was succeeded as president by A. Barton Hepburn, another former Comptroller of the Currency. Cannon remained chairman of the board until February 1911, retaining his directorship around 1933.

Cannon also served as a director of the Great Northern Railroad, the Lake Erie and Western Railroad, the New York, Ontario and Western Railway, and the Oregon Railroad and Navigation Company. He also served as president of the Pacific Coast Company and was a director of the Manhattan Trust Company and the United States Guarantee Company.

=== Society life ===
In 1892, Cannon and his wife were included in Ward McAllister's "Four Hundred", purported to be an index of New York's best families, published in The New York Times. Conveniently, 400 was the number of people that could fit into Mrs. Astor's ballroom.

Cannon was also a member of the Union League Club, the Century Club, the Players Club, the Metropolitan Club, the Tuxedo Club, the New York Yacht Club, the National Arts Club, the Railroad Club of New York and the Cosmos Club in Washington, D.C. In 1899, he received and honorary degree from Dartmouth College. Cannon had also been a member of the Peary Arctic Club; Cape Cannon in Greenland was named after him by Robert Peary.

In 1915, Cannon donated Alessandro Longhi's Portrait of Count Carlo Aurelio Widman, the grandnephew of Pope Clement XIII, to the Metropolitan Museum of Art in New York.

== Personal life ==
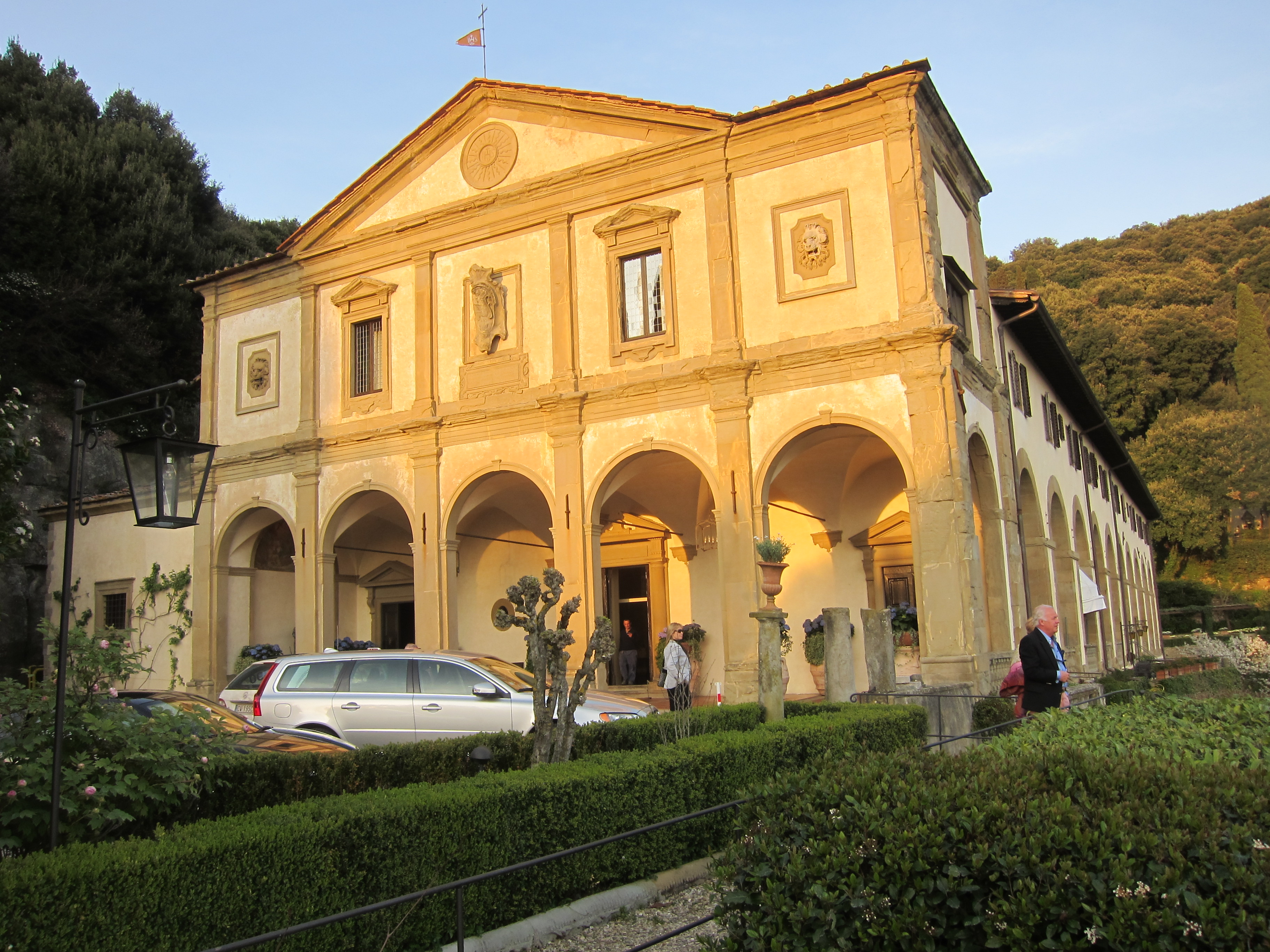
Cannon's Villa, Convent of San Michele alla Doccia, in Italy

On November 20, 1879, Cannon was married to Jennie Olive Curtis (1851–1929), the daughter of Gold Tompkins Curtis (1821–1862) and relation of John Jay Knox, in Washington, D.C. Her father was a prominent attorney who gave up his practice during the U.S. Civil War to raise a company, the 5th Minnesota Volunteers to fight, dying in 1862 during his service. Together, they were the parents of:

- George Curtis Cannon (b. 1882)
- Henry White Cannon Jr. (b. 1887)

His wife, known for her forceful and talented speaking skills, was a prominent suffragist who advocated for the right to vote for women, and in 1915 was the Delaware County Suffrage Leader, providing the club with its headquarters. Jennie later served as the vice-president of the National American Woman Suffrage Association.

In September 1930, Cannon, then an eighty-year-old widower, married Myrta L. Jones of Cleveland.

Cannon died on April 27, 1934, in Daytona Beach, Florida. He was buried in Delhi, New York. His estate was left to his widow and sons in one-third shares after specific bequests.

=== Residences ===
The Cannons resided at 15 East 62nd Street in Manhattan, and owned homes on Main Street in Delhi, Park Avenue in Huntington on Long Island, and on South Beach Street in Daytona Beach, Florida.

In 1900, Cannon purchased the Convent of San Michele alla Doccia sotto Fiesole in Florence, Italy. He renovated the building and its gardens.

Political offices
| Preceded by John Jay Knox | Comptroller of the Currency; 1884–1886 | Succeeded by William L. Trenholm |
Business positions
| Preceded by John Thompson | Chase President; 1891-1904 | Succeeded by A. Barton Hepburn |
