= Roswell Hart =

American politician (1824–1883)

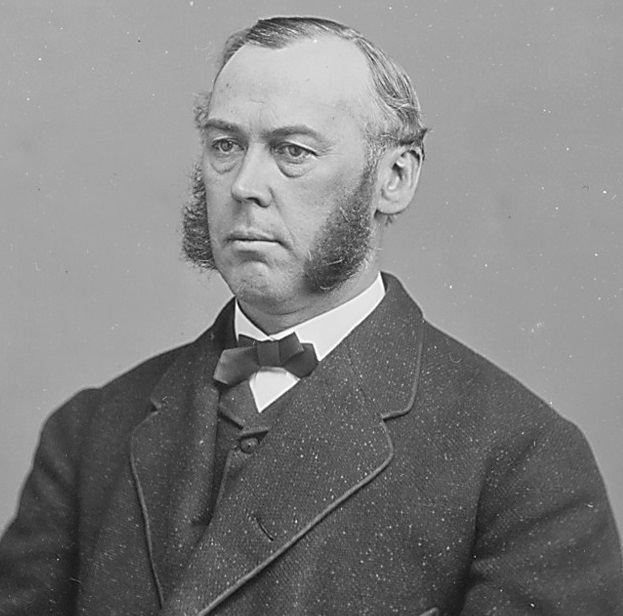

Member of the U.S. House of Representatives from New York's 28th district
- In office March 4, 1865 – March 3, 1867
- Preceded by: Freeman Clarke
- Succeeded by: Lewis Selye

Personal details
- Born: August 4, 1824 Rochester, New York, U.S.
- Died: April 20, 1883 (aged 58) Rochester, New York, U.S.
- Resting place: Mount Hope Cemetery
- Party: Republican
- Education: Yale College
- Profession: Politician, lawyer

Roswell Hart (August 4, 1824 – April 20, 1883) was a United States representative from New York. Born in Rochester, he completed preparatory studies and graduated from Yale College in 1843, where he was a member of Skull and Bones. He studied law, was admitted to the bar in 1847, and engaged in commercial pursuits.

Hart was elected as a Republican to the 39th United States Congress, holding office from March 4, 1865, to March 4, 1867. He was an unsuccessful candidate for reelection in 1866 to the 40th United States Congress and was superintendent of the Railway Mail Service for the States of New York and Pennsylvania from 1869 to 1876. In 1883 he died in Rochester; interment was in Mount Hope Cemetery.

U.S. House of Representatives
Preceded by Freeman Clarke	Member of the U.S. House of Representatives from New York's 28th congressional district 1865–1867	Succeeded by Lewis Selye
