= Lewis Selye =

American politician

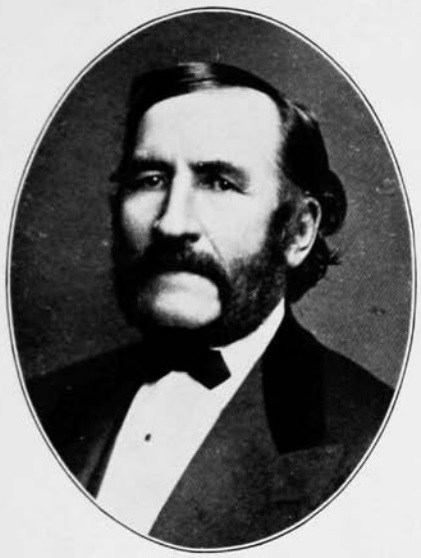
Lewis Selye (New York Congressman)

Lewis Selye (July 11, 1803 – January 27, 1883) was a U.S. representative from New York.

Born in Chittenango, New York, Selye attended the common schools, and learned the blacksmith trade. He moved to Rochester, New York, in 1824 and engaged in the manufacture of iron. He also built hand fire engines between 1832 and 1849 and was listed in the 1834 Rochester City Directory as a "fire engine builder." He served as a member of the Board of Supervisors of Monroe County for several terms.

Selye was elected alderman in 1841. He served as a member of the common council in 1843, 1856, and 1871. He was the county treasurer of Monroe County from 1848–1851 and in 1854.

Selye was elected as an independent Republican to the Fortieth Congress (March 4, 1867 – March 3, 1869). In 1868 he established the Rochester Daily Chronicle, which was merged with the Rochester Democrat and Chronicle in 1870. He was a trustee of the Monroe County Savings Bank. He died in Rochester, New York on January 27, 1883, and was interred in Mount Hope Cemetery.

== Sources ==
- United States Congress. "Lewis Selye (id: S000237)". Biographical Directory of the United States Congress.

U.S. House of Representatives
Preceded by Roswell Hart	Member of the U.S. House of Representatives from New York's 28th congressional district 1867–1869	Succeeded by Noah Davis
