= Albion Correctional Facility =

Women's prison in Albion, New York

Coordinates: 43°14′42″N 78°12′55″W

- Interactive map of Albion Correctional Facility
- Location: 3595 State School Road Albion, New York
- Status: Operational
- Security class: Medium-security
- Capacity: 1128
- Opened: 1894
- Managed by: New York State Department of Corrections and Community Supervision
- Warden: Melinda Samuelson

Albion Correctional Facility is a medium security prison for women in the Town of Albion, Orleans County, New York, United States, that is operated by the New York State Department of Correctional Services. The site was founded in 1894 as the Western House of Refuge for Women, then later the Albion State Training School. The prison is just outside the village of Albion.

Albion is one of New York facilities exclusively for women, the others being Bedford Hills Correctional Facility, Taconic Correctional Facility. Most famously, Albion housed "Long Island Lolita" Amy Fisher for 3½ years; she was then transferred to the Bedford Hills Correctional Facility for Women, the only maximum security prison for women in New York State and located in Bedford Hills, New York.

As of 2010 Albion had a working capacity of 1247.

== Notable inmates ==
- Amy Fisher, transferred to the Bedford Hills Correctional Facility for Women
- Anna Sorokin, fraudster
