= Jennie Curtis Cannon =

American suffragist

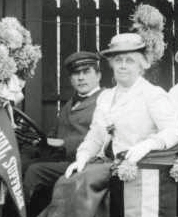
- Cannon in her decorated automobile
- Born: Jennie Olive Curtis; October 15, 1851; Peterboro, New York, US
- Died: September 8, 1929 (aged 77); At sea
- Resting place: Delhi, New York
- Other name: Mrs. Henry W. Cannon
- Occupation: Suffragist
- Spouse: Henry White Cannon (m. 1879)
- Children: 2

Jennie Olive Curtis Cannon (October 15, 1851 – September 8, 1929) was an American suffragist.

== Early life ==
Cannon was born on October 15, 1851, in Peterboro, New York. She was a daughter of Mary Abigail (née Anderson) Curtis and Gold Tompkins Curtis (1821–1862). Her father was a prominent attorney who gave up his practice during the U.S. Civil War to raise a company, the 5th Minnesota Volunteers to fight, dying in 1862 during his service.

Her younger brother was Gold Tompkins Curtis Jr. and she was a relation of John Jay Knox.

== Activism ==
Cannon was a prominent suffragist who advocated for the right to vote for women. She was a member of the New York State Equal Suffrage Association, first serving as district director and then third vice president. She went on to become the Vice President of the National American Woman Suffrage Association.

She was known for her forceful and talented speaking skills and was active on the local level. She maintained the Delhi, New York, headquarters for the suffrage campaign. In 1914 Cannon organized an Equal Suffrage Convention in Delhi which included Carrie Chapman Catt as a speaker. In 1915 Cannon organized a mass suffrage meeting in Hancock, New York. She also advocated for suffrage by driving around Delaware County in her decorated automobile. She provided the club with its headquarters.

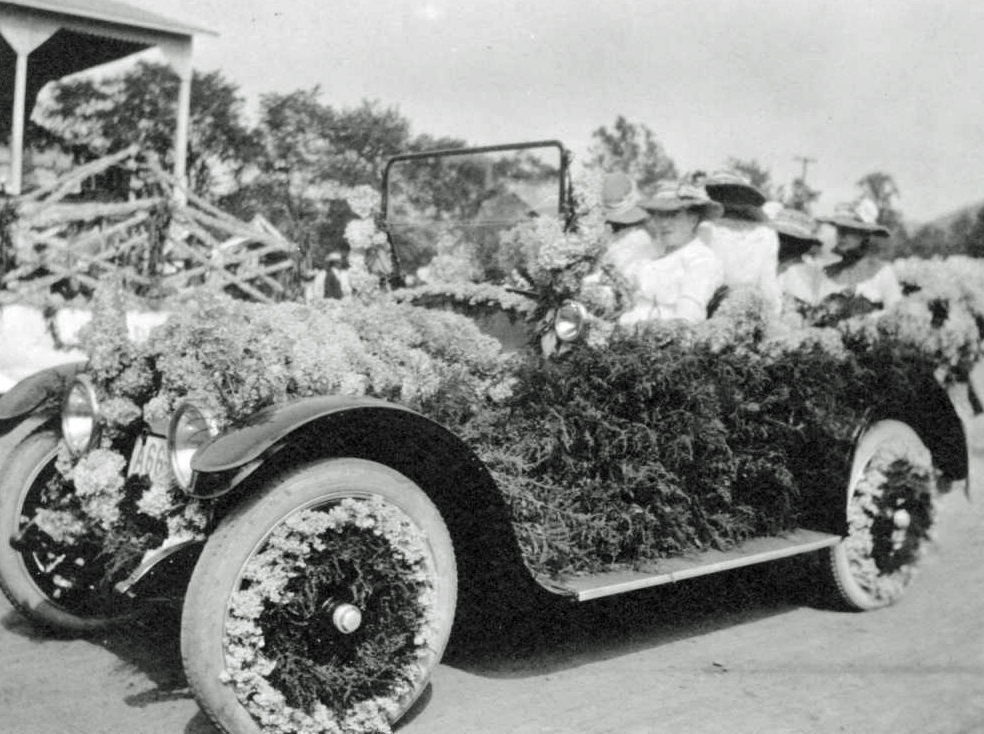
Mrs. Cannon's Equal Suffrage Car, side view

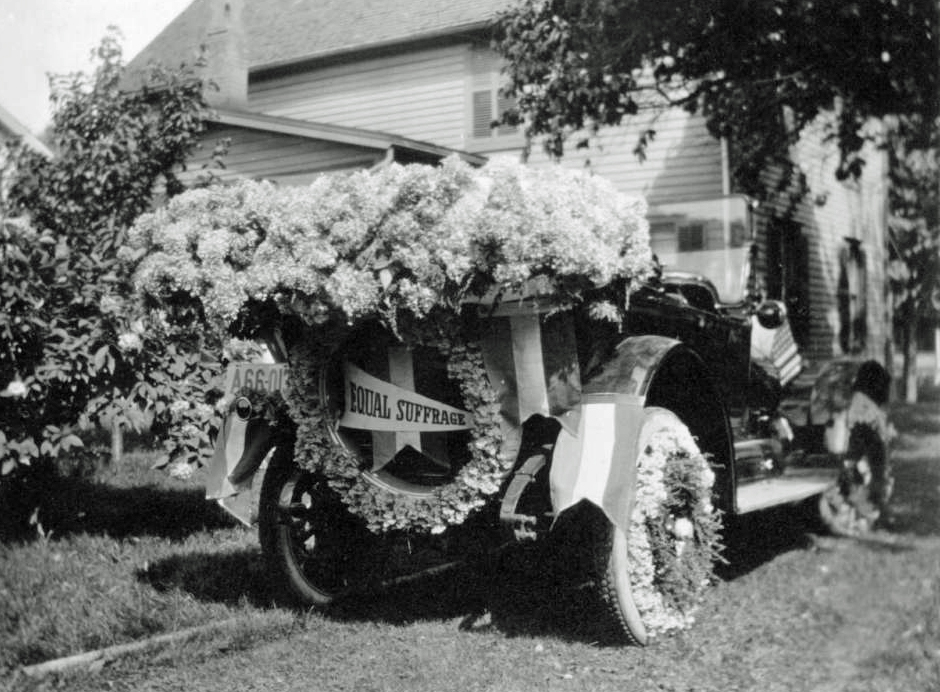
Mrs. Cannon's Equal Suffrage Car, back view

== Personal life ==
On November 20, 1879, Cannon was married to Henry White Cannon (1850–1934) in Washington, D.C. Cannon served as the United States Comptroller of the Currency from 1884 to 1886 and president of Chase National Bank from 1886 to February 1904. Together, they were the parents of:

- George Curtis Cannon (1882–1956), a Harvard graduate who collected vintage cars and designed hydroplanes.
- Henry White Cannon Jr. (1887–1966), an artist.

Cannon died at sea, aboard the ship The Majestic on September 8, 1929. Her widower died on April 27, 1934, in Daytona Beach, Florida. He was also buried in Delhi, New York.

== Legacy ==
Cannon's home in Delhi now houses the Town of Delhi Historical Society. Canon's collection of clippings and photographs documenting her suffrage activities comprise the "Jennie Curtis Cannon Collection" of the Delaware County Historical Association and the New York Heritage Digital Collection.

== See also ==
- List of suffragists and suffragettes
