= Tousley-Church House =

Historic house in New York, United States

- U.S. National Register of Historic Places
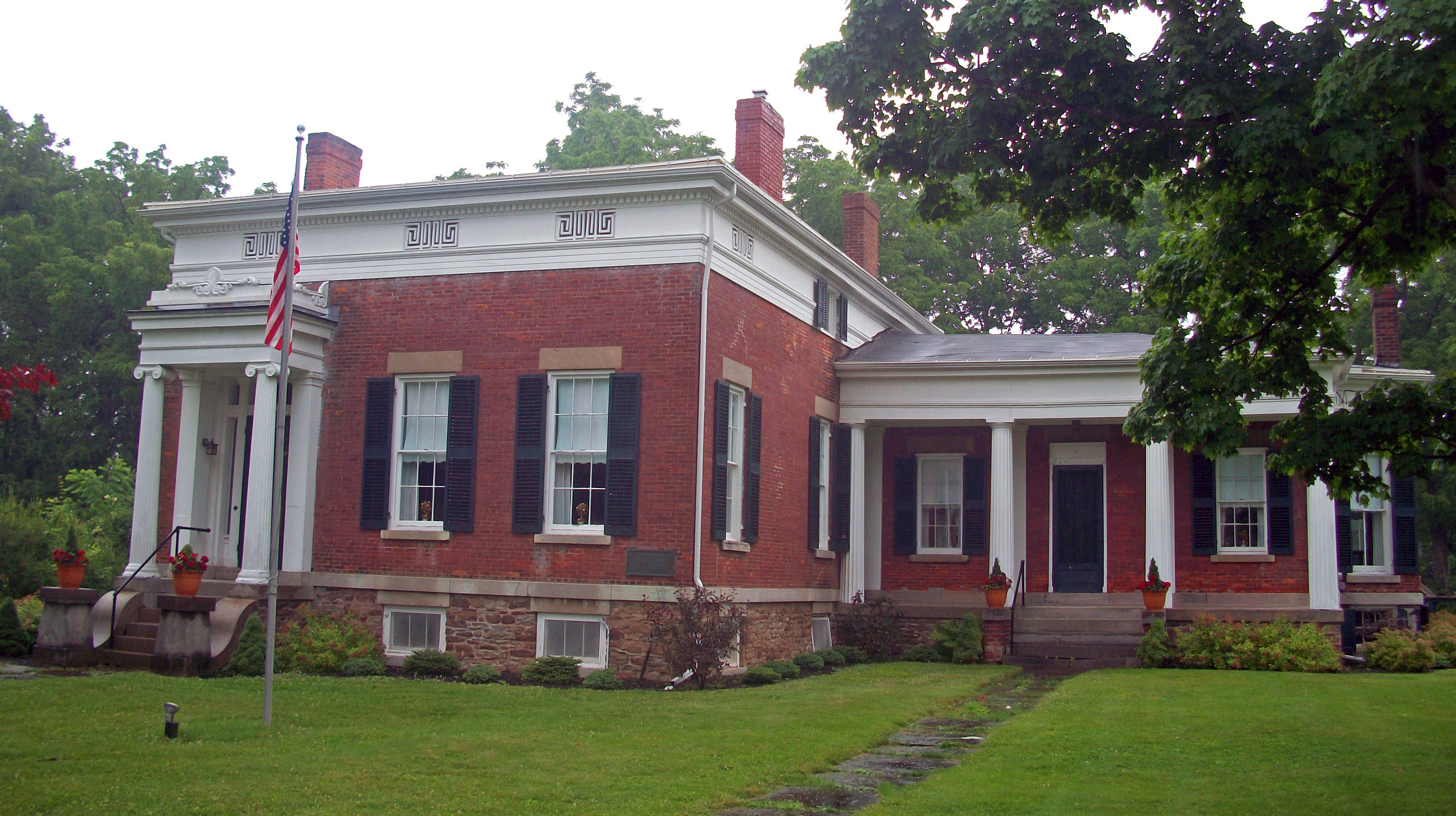
- West (front) elevation, 2010

- Location within New York Location within the United States
- Interactive map showing Tousley-Church House
- Location: Albion, NY
- Nearest city: Batavia
- Coordinates: 43°15′8″N 78°11′34″W
- Area: 0.8 acres (3,200 m^{2})
- Built: 1840
- Architectural style: Greek Revival
- NRHP reference No.: 01001565
- Added to NRHP: February 5, 2002

The Tousley-Church House is located on North Main Street (New York State Route 98) in Albion, New York, United States. It is a brick house in the Greek Revival architectural style built in two different stages in the mid-19th century.

It shows the strong influence of Minard Lafever, a prominent contemporary practitioner of the style, although its own architect is not known. For many years it was owned by descendants of Sanford E. Church, a local politician who was prominent statewide. Since 1930 it has been the headquarters of the local chapter of the Daughters of the American Revolution (DAR). In 2002 it was listed on the National Register of Historic Places.

== Building ==
The Tousley-Church House is located in an 0.8-acre (0.32 ha) lot on the northeast corner of North Main and Linwood Avenue, in the section of the village of Albion north of the Erie Canal (now part of the New York State Barge Canal), in the Town of Gaines. The terrain is level. The surrounding neighborhood is residential, with most houses dating to the late 19th or early 20th centuries.

Mature trees on the front lawn provide shade. A narrow sandstone walk leads from the sidewalk on North Main to the house's main entrance. An unpaved parking area in the rear is accessed through a curb cut on Linwood.

=== Exterior ===
The house, the only building on the property, consists of three sections, a main block and south wing, both brick, and a frame rear wing to the east. The main block is a one-and-a-half-story structure on a fieldstone foundation with an ashlar limestone water table. The brick above is laid in common bond. It rises to a wide wooden frieze below the hipped roof surfaced in bitumen, pierced by four brick chimneys near the corners.

In the southerly two of the three bays on the west (front) facade, the windows are set off by plain stone sills and lintels with black wooden louvered shutters. The wide frieze is topped with a dentil molding topped by bead and reel molding. Above the windows are grilles in the shape of Greek keys with hinged windows behind them.

The north bay has a small projecting portico sheltering the main entrance. The steps leading up to it and its deck are made of large gray limestone blocks. Wide cheek walls on either side of the stairs have a quarter-round profile following the steps' fall line to identical square stone pedestals topped with cap blocks, currently holding large flower pots, identical to the plinth blocks underneath the two wooden fluted Ionic columns supporting the portico's hipped roof. It has an elaborate entablature with cornice, frieze, dentilled taenia and architrave. The gutter is surrounded on three sides by a gutter with acroteria topped with an anthemion. Two engaged pilasters with Tuscan capitals support the roof at the rear.

The south wing is only one story in height, but has similar treatments to the main block, with less decoration. A full porch spans the west facade, where a secondary entrance is located in the middle of its three bays. It is also floored in gray limestone with similar steps, but is supported by Doric columns, backed at the wall by similarly treated pilasters, with a plain frieze. A three-sided bay projects from the south wall.

On the east, the one-and-a-half-story frame wing's foundation has been partially replaced by stone-faced concrete block and stuccoed over. The stairs to its entrances on the south and east are also concrete. A small gabled canopy is over the east door. Its windows are smaller than those on the rest of the house. The roofline has a boxed cornice with raking fasciae.

=== Interior ===
The main entrance, framed by square pilasters, sidelights and a transom with a pattern of repeating semicircles set in a rectangular border, holds a stained and varnished door with recessed panels decorated in a leaf-and-dart pattern. It opens into an entrance hall with a switchback stair, its open stringers decorated with a scroll relief. The newel at the base consists of a square bottom with a round turned post carved in an acanthus leaf relief pattern. It is capped in a carved acanthus scroll. Narrow turned balusters support the handrail, and four Doric columns support the landing and upper run.

The windows in the entrance hall have wide casings with backband trim, shouldered architraves and thick cap moldings. A large plaster ceiling medallion, with a floral rosette including two strings of striated petals inside a ring of alternating acanthus and small rosettes, holds an acorn-globe light fixture on a chain. At the rear of the entrance hall is a former bedroom. Its fireplace has a black marble Italianate mantel and cast iron firebox.

South of the entrance hall is a large room with 11-foot-9-inch (3.58 m) ceiling occupying the rest of the main block. It is elaborately decorated as well, starting with a one-foot (30 cm) three-member molded baseboard running around the room's entire perimeter. The door and window surrounds are more detailed than the ones in the entrance hall. Their architraves have a regularly spaced row of rosettes, and their cap moldings have a scroll relief surrounded by freestanding anthemia. The architraves' rosette motif is repeated on the black marble mantel, with a cast iron surround inside it done in reed-and-tie molding. Three more acorn-globe light fixtures hang from the ceiling by chains. The second floor has three large rooms with sloped plaster ceilings, following that of the roof above.

A paneled double door connects to another large room in the south wing. It has a lower ceiling and more restrained decoration — the window and surrounds are a flat casing with molded backband A Colonial Revival fireplace with exposed brick mantel is in the center wall of the projecting bay.

The east wing contains the kitchen and a woodshed. It has seven-foot (2.1 m) plaster ceilings with walls finished in rough plaster. On the east wall is an early 19th-century cooking fireplace and baking oven with wooden Federal style mantel. The oven is behind two wooden doors. The doors have narrow casings with beaded Federal style backbands. There is a small pantry in the northeast corner. The woodshed, on the east, has an earthen floor below the kitchen's floor level.

== History ==
John Lee, a resident of nearby Barre who came north for the business opportunities presented by the canal, built what is today the south and rear wings around 1840. The kitchen fireplace and oven, woodshed, and the door and window casings reflecting the transition between the Federal and Greek Revival styles are the most prominent remnants of this house. In 1848 he and his wife sold the house, then on a 20-acre (8.1 ha) lot, to Orson Tousley.

A son of one of the county's earliest settlers, Tousley had run a tavern in Clarendon until 1837, when he began speculating in real estate and pursuing various other business ventures, including the contract for widening the canal through the county and some of the early railroad construction in the area. He served in several public offices in Clarendon, including town supervisor around the time he bought the house.

In the next decade he enlarged and renovated the house, adding the new main block. The previous main block, now the south wing, was converted to a hipped roof to harmonize with the larger portion. Like most of those made affluent by the canal and its business in the area, he embraced the newly popular Greek Revival style. In particular Tousley's alterations and new construction, with its intricate and elaborate decoration both inside and out, show the influence of Minard Lafever and his pattern books of the time.

Tousley died in 1863, leaving the house to his young daughter Florence. Three years later she married George Church, son of Sanford E. Church, former lieutenant governor and chief of New York's highest court, the Court of Appeals. George himself would serve as deputy superintendent of insurance and deputy state treasurer. The Churches only major change to the house was the addition of the projecting bay on the south wing's south wall, around 1870.

Florence Church lived into her eighties, becoming one of the 25 founding members of the local Daughters of the American Revolution (DAR) chapter when it was established in 1925, serving as its regent. She died shortly thereafter, and bequeathed the house to her son Sanford T. Church, who had gone into the law and served as a judge locally for many years. He and his wife, also named Florence, sold the house to Emma Reed Webster in 1929 for $2,000 ($38,000 in contemporary dollars) more than the small mortgage remaining on it. They stipulated that the extra money would be donated to the Orleans DAR, and the county historical society, to start an endowment in the Church family name.

Two months later Webster, who was not a member of the chapter and later moved to Utica, donated the house to the DAR. To adapt it for use as an organizational building, she paid for the installation of central heating and carpeting to conceal the concrete floors she had poured, the removal of an exterior woodshed and other outbuildings once shown on the map, the addition of the fireplace and chimney in the south wing bay, and the combination of the five rooms in the main block and south wing into two large meeting spaces. She also gave the chapter furniture including a hundred chairs, and an electric range in the kitchen. When she died she also left the chapter an endowment. There have been no other alterations to the house since, and it has remained the local DAR chapter's building.

== See also ==
- National Register of Historic Places listings in Orleans County, New York
