= John Jay Knox Jr. =

American financier (1828–1892)

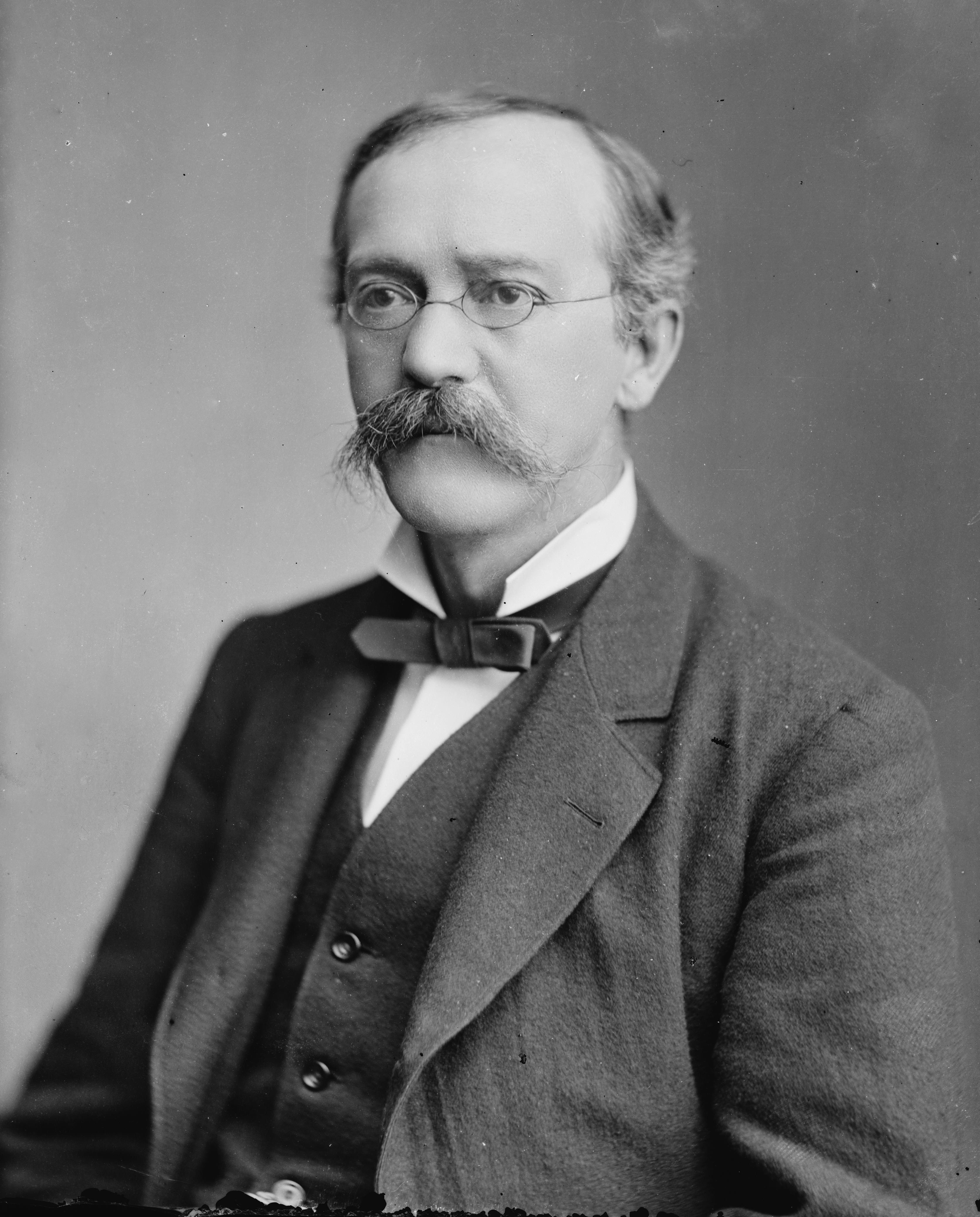
- Knox, 1870–1880

4th Comptroller of the Currency
- In office April 25, 1872 – April 30, 1884
- President: Ulysses S. Grant; Rutherford B. Hayes; James Garfield; Chester A. Arthur
- Preceded by: Hiland R. Hulburd
- Succeeded by: Henry W. Cannon

Acting Commissioner of Internal Revenue
- In office May 11, 1883 – May 20, 1883
- President: Chester A. Arthur
- Preceded by: Henry C. Rogers (acting); Green Berry Raum
- Succeeded by: Walter Evans

Personal details
- Born: March 19, 1828 Knoxboro, New York, U.S.
- Died: February 9, 1892 (aged 63) New York City, New York, U.S.
- Resting place: Oak Hill Cemetery; Washington, D.C., U.S.
- Spouse: Caroline Elizabeth Todd
- Education: Hamilton College

John Jay Knox Jr. (March 19, 1828 – February 9, 1892) was an American financier and government official. He is best remembered as a primary author of the Coinage Act of 1873, which discontinued the use of the silver dollar.

Knox was Comptroller of the Currency from 1872 to 1884. An advocate of uniform currency for the national banks of the country, his portrait was featured on the obverse of the $100 United States national bank notes of the Series of 1902.

== Early life ==
John Jay Knox Jr. was born March 19, 1828, in Knoxboro, New York, today a part of the town of Augusta. He was a son of Sarah Ann (née Curtis) Knox (1794–1875) and John J. Knox Sr. (1791–1876), a prominent merchant and bank president and was himself the namesake of Knoxboro.

The younger Knox was well educated and attended Hamilton College in Clinton, New York, from which he graduated in 1849.

== Career ==
Upon graduation he went to work for his father in his bank, working there as a teller for two years before moving to a bank in Syracuse, New York, where he worked for four more years. Knox gained experience and authority in a series of further jobs in the banking industry which followed, including stops in Binghamton, New York, Norfolk, Virginia.

=== Private banker ===
In 1857, shortly before Minnesota was admitted to the United States, Knox and his brother, Henry M. Knox, launched their own banking house, J. Jay Knox & Co., in the city of St. Paul with the financial backing of their father. In October 1859, they purchased the Central Bank of New Ulm, Minnesota, a note-issuing bank organized under the free banking law of Minnesota, but continued their office in St. Paul. By June 1861, pressures of the Civil War contributed to a devastating depreciation in the bonds used to secure notes of the Central Bank, and the Knox brothers allowed the bank to fail. Note holders were eventually paid 30 cents on the dollar for Central Bank notes. This experience significantly shaped Knox's opinion on banking.

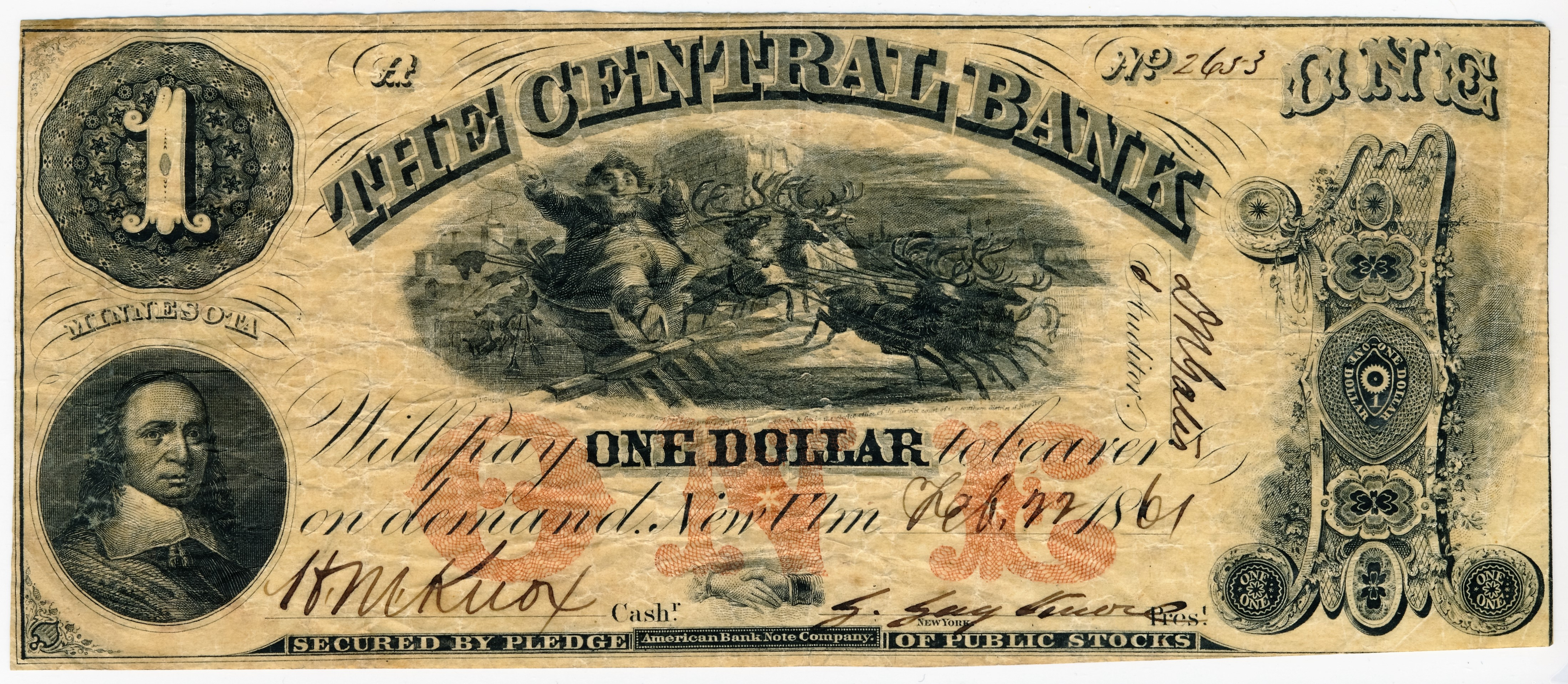
$1 note issued by The Central Bank of New Ulm signed by J. Jay Knox, president.

Knox became an advocate of the system of national banks proposed by U.S. Secretary of the Treasury Salmon P. Chase and contributed ideas to the national bank debate, advocating safe and convertible notes of a uniform type for all national banks, backed by the guarantee of government bonds. He authored two influential articles on the matter, published in Hunt's Merchants' Magazine in 1861 and 1862, which gained the notice of Secretary Chase. Chase would bring Knox into the service of the Treasury Department in 1863.

=== Government career ===
John Jay Knox's portrait was featured on the $100 National Bank Notes of the series of 1902.

Working in the Treasury Department throughout the closing years of the American Civil War, in 1866 Knox was put in charge of the Mint and Coinage Correspondence for that department. He authored a report on the San Francisco Mint in 1866 and later in that same year discovered a $1.1 million misappropriation of funds in a similar report on the activities of the New Orleans Mint — the largest such misappropriation in US government history up to that time.

Knox was made Deputy Comptroller of the Currency in 1867. In that capacity in April 1870, Knox prepared a 100-page report codifying the mint and coinage laws of the United States. This was followed in June 1870 with another report of similar length, collecting the views of mint employees and financial experts and providing for legislation to eliminate the silver dollar from circulation. Knox's proposal was passed into law after a few amendments as the Coinage Act of 1873 — an event which triggered a rapid fall in the price of silver and which ushered in an era of bitter currency debate which dominated the political landscape for the better part of three decades.

President Ulysses S. Grant promoted Knox to Comptroller of the Currency in 1872. He was reappointed to a second 5-year term by President Rutherford B. Hayes in 1877, and to a third term by President Chester A. Arthur in 1882.

On May 1, 1884, Knox resigned his post in order to become president of the National Bank of the Republic in New York City. At the time of his resignation he had served 17 years in the Comptroller's office as part of almost 22 years in the Treasury Department, making him the longest serving officer in that department.

== Personal life ==
Knox was married to Caroline Elizabeth Todd (1847–1922), a daughter of Elizabeth Irving (née Gilliss) Todd and William Balch Todd, a director of the Bank of the Metropolis. Together, they were the parents of:

- John Jay Knox (1874–1875), who died in infancy.
- John Jay Knox III (1877–1913), who died in Colorado Springs.
- Irving Gilliss Knox (1879–1921), a Yale University graduate who became a member of L.F. Rothschild & Co. in New York.
- Herman Warren Knox (1882–1931), the former secretary of the Texas and Pacific Oil Company.

Knox died at his home in New York City on February 9, 1892. He was 63 years old at the time of his death and was buried at Oak Hill Cemetery in Washington. His widow died in 1922 while she was President of the Women's Board of the Babies Hospital.

== Works ==
- The Surplus and the Public Debt: Address of the Hon. John Jay Knox...at the Annual Convention of the American Bankers' Association at Pittsburgh, Pennsylvania, October 12, 1887. New York: Bankers' Publishing Association, 1887.
- Interview of John Jay Knox...Before the Committee on Coinage, Weights, and Measures of the House of Representatives upon the Coinage Act of 1873 and the Silver Question, Saturday, February 21, 1891. Washington, DC: Government Printing Office, 1891.
- United States Notes: A History of the Various Issues of Paper Money by the Government of the United States. Revised Third Edition. New York: Charles Scribner's Sons, 1892.
- History of Banking in the United States. By late John Jay Knox, assisted by Corps of Financial Writers, Revised and Brought Up to Date by Bradford Rhodes and Elmer H. Youngman, New York: Bradford Rhodes & Company, 1900.

Political offices
Preceded by Hiland R. Hulburd	Comptroller of the Currency; 1872–1884	Succeeded by Henry W. Cannon
