= Elizabeth Denio =

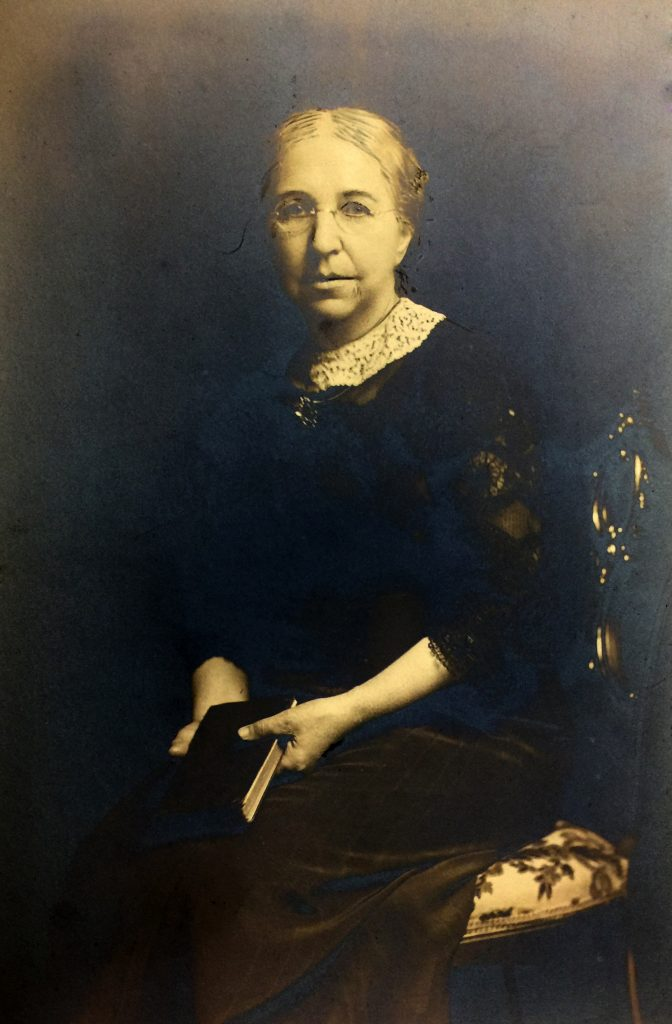
- Born: 3 August 1842; Albion, New York
- Died: 23 December 1922 (aged 80); Rochester
- Other names: Dr Denio
- Education: University of Berlin, Leipzig and Heidelberg
- Known for: First woman to teach at Rochester
- Title: Emeritus Professor

Elizabeth Harriet Denio (3 August 1842 – 23 December 1922) was an American teacher who was the first woman to teach at the University of Rochester. She retired as Professor Emeritus in 1917.

== Life ==
Denio was born in Albion, New York, in 1842.

She traveled to Germany to obtain a doctorate in art history. She failed to qualify in Berlin and Leipzig. Leipzig was her favorite and she attended the lectures of ten different professors, despite the rule that women were not admitted. She led a group of Wellesley students to visit the university in 1889. She was successful in obtaining her doctorate at the University of Heidelberg in October 1898. Her thesis was on the "Life and Works of Nicholas Pouissin".

She returned to America where she was employed by the University of Rochester in 1902. This was the year after the first woman obtained a degree at Rochester. Denio was the first woman to teach and her wages were covered by Emily Sibley Watson.

In 1910 she was promoted. She was mentioned by the university president, Benjamin Rush Rhees, in his annual report, in which he lauded Denio's teaching. She retired in 1917 with the title of Professor Emeritus.

Denio died after being struck by a car in Rochester.
