= Lorenzo Burrows =

American merchant, banker and politician

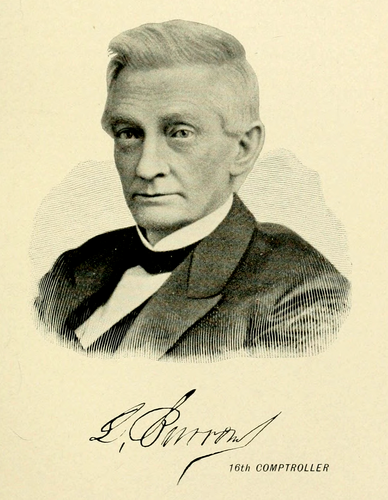

18th New York State Comptroller
- In office January 1, 1856 – December 31, 1857
- Governor: Myron H. Clark; John A. King
- Preceded by: James M. Cook
- Succeeded by: Sanford E. Church

Member of the U.S. House of Representatives from New York's 34th congressional district
- In office March 4, 1849 – March 3, 1853
- Preceded by: Washington Hunt
- Succeeded by: Walter L. Sessions

Personal details
- Born: March 15, 1805 Groton, Connecticut
- Died: March 6, 1885 (age 79) Albion, New York
- Party: Know Nothing; Whig
- Profession: Clerk, politician

Lorenzo Burrows (March 15, 1805 – March 6, 1885) was an American merchant, banker and politician.

== Life ==
He attended the academies at Plainfield, Connecticut, and Westerly, Rhode Island. He moved to New York and settled in Albion, N.Y., in 1824. He was employed as a clerk until 1826 when he engaged in mercantile pursuits. He assisted in establishing the Bank of Albion in 1839 and served as cashier. He was Treasurer of Orleans County in 1840 and was Assignee in bankruptcy for Orleans County in 1841. He was Supervisor of the Town of Barre in 1845, and was elected as a Whig to the 31st and 32nd United States Congresses, serving from March 4, 1849, to March 4, 1853.

In August 1852, he declined to be appointed United States Postmaster General by President Millard Fillmore. Instead, Fillmore (a fellow New York Whig) chose Connecticut Whig Samuel Dickinson Hubbard.

He was eighteenth New York State Comptroller from 1856 to 1857, elected on the American Party ticket in 1855. He won 33.98% of the vote over the Republican, and the two Democrats.

He ran unsuccessfully for Governor of New York on the American Party ticket in 1858. Unlike three years previously, where he won with slightly over a third of the vote, he only narrowly got over ten percent this election while both the reunited Democratic Party and the recently established Republican Party both won over forty percent.

He was director of the Niagara Falls International Bridge Co. He was chosen as a regent of New York University in 1858 and appointed one of the commissioners of Mount Albion Cemetery in 1862, serving in both of these capacities until his death in 1885. He was buried at Mount Albion.

His uncle Daniel Burrows was a United States representative from Connecticut. His brother Latham A. Burrows was a New York state senator. Both served in Congress or in the state legislature in the 1820s.

== Sources ==
- United States Congress. "Lorenzo Burrows (id: B001143)". Biographical Directory of the United States Congress.
- Political Graveyard
- His declination to be Postmaster General, in NYT on August 27, 1852
- Google Books The New York Civil List compiled by Franklin Benjamin Hough (page 34; Weed, Parsons and Co., 1858)

Party political offices
Preceded by Erastus Brooks	Know Nothing nominee for Governor of New York; 1858	Succeeded by None
U.S. House of Representatives
Preceded by Washington Hunt	Member of the U.S. House of Representatives from New York's 34th congressional district 1849–1853	Succeeded by Walter L. Sessions
Political offices
Preceded by James M. Cook	New York State Comptroller; 1856–1857	Succeeded by Sanford E. Church
