= Noah Davis (judge) =

American judge (1818–1902)

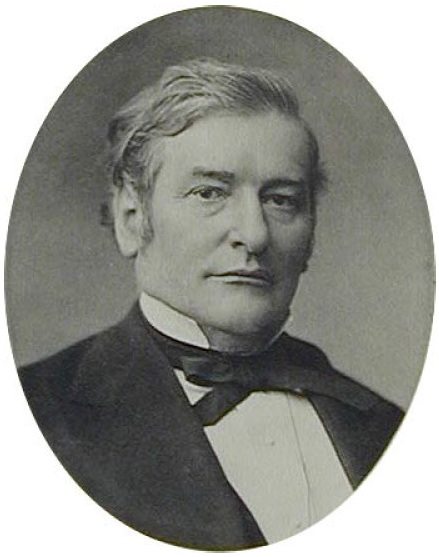

Judge of the New York Supreme Court
- In office 1872–1887

United States Attorney for the Southern District of New York
- In office July 20, 1870 – December 31, 1872

Member of the U.S. House of Representatives from New York's 28th district
- In office March 4, 1869 – July 15, 1870
- Preceded by: Lewis Selye
- Succeeded by: Charles H. Holmes

Judge of the New York Supreme Court
- In office 1857–1868

Personal details
- Born: September 10, 1818 Haverhill, New Hampshire
- Died: March 20, 1902 (aged 83) New York City, U.S.
- Party: Republican

Noah Davis (September 10, 1818 – March 20, 1902) was an American lawyer and politician from New York.

== Life ==
Davis was born in Haverhill, New Hampshire on September 10, 1818, the son of Noah Davis (1781–1863) and Freelove Crawford (Arnold) Davis. He was the grandson of Jonathan Arnold and the nephew of Lemuel Hastings Arnold. Davis's family moved to Albion, New York in 1825, and he attended Lima Seminary in Buffalo, New York. Then he studied law in Lewiston, New York, was admitted to the bar in 1841, and practiced in Gainesville, New York, and Buffalo. He returned to Albion in February 1844 and practiced law in partnership with Sanford E. Church.

In 1857, he was appointed to the New York Supreme Court (8th District) to fill the vacancy caused by the resignation of James Mullett, and was subsequently elected to two eight-year terms, but resigned in 1868 after his election to Congress. He was ex officio a judge of the New York Court of Appeals in 1865.

Davis was elected as a Republican to the 41st United States Congress, and served from March 4, 1869, to July 15, 1870, when he resigned. Davis was appointed by President Ulysses S. Grant U.S. Attorney for the Southern District of New York and held that office from July 20, 1870, to December 31, 1872, when he resigned.

In November 1872, he was elected to a 14-year term on the New York Supreme Court (1st District). He presided over the trial of William M. Tweed in 1873, whose defense counsel included David Dudley Field II and Elihu Root. Nine years later, he presided over the trial of a brakeman charged with manslaughter in the death of eight passengers, including state senator Webster Wagner, in a Bronx train wreck. Davis noted that it was probably the first time a railroad employee had faced criminal prosecution for passenger deaths in an accident; the brakeman was acquitted. After his term expired, he resumed the practice of law in New York City and was a member of the council of the University of the City of New York (now New York University.) he died in 1902 in New York

He was buried at Mount Albion Cemetery in Albion.

U.S. House of Representatives
Preceded by Lewis Selye	Member of the U.S. House of Representatives from New York's 28th congressional district 1869–1870	Succeeded by Charles H. Holmes
