= Hiland R. Hulburd =

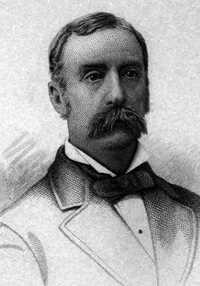

3rd Comptroller of the Currency
- In office February 1, 1867 - April 3, 1872
- President: Andrew Johnson; Ulysses S. Grant
- Preceded by: Freeman Clarke
- Succeeded by: John Jay Knox

Personal details
- Born: 1829; Columbus, Ohio
- Died: June 28, 1880 (aged 50–51); Manhattan, New York

Hiland R. Hulburd (1829 – June 28, 1880) was a United States Comptroller of the Currency from 1867 to 1872.

A member of the bar from Ohio, Hiland R. Hulburd was appointed deputy comptroller in August 1865. President Andrew Johnson appointed him Comptroller eighteen months later.

With Hulburd's support, legislation was enacted which allowed Comptrollers to call for reports of condition from the national banks at least five times a year, without warning. The element of surprise greatly enhanced the reliability of the call reports. After his term as Comptroller, Hulburd pursued interests in the oil industry.
