= Mount Albion Cemetery =

Historic rural cemetery in New York state

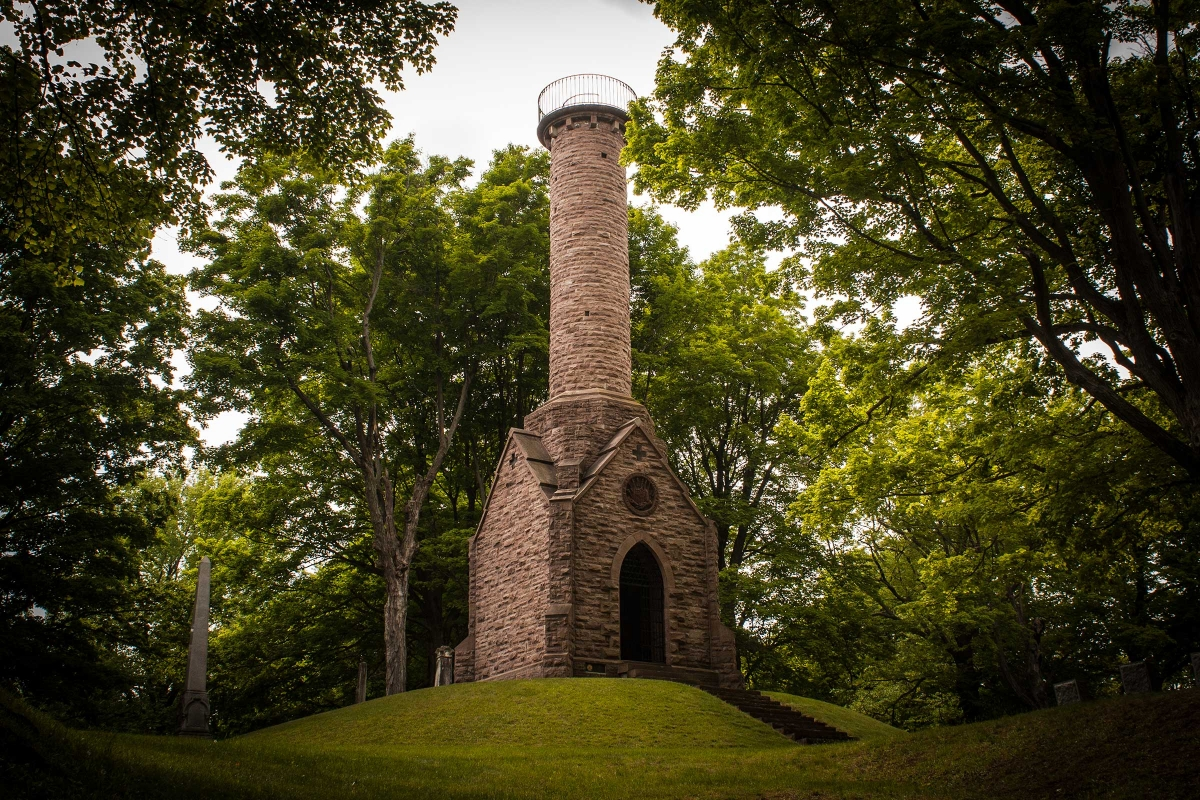
- Soldiers & Sailors Monument at Mt. Albion Cemetery, 2016
- Interactive map of Mount Albion Cemetery

Details
- Established: September 7, 1843
- Location: NY 31, Albion, NY
- Country: US
- Coordinates: 43.2394°N 78.1556°W
- Type: Municipal
- Owned by: Village of Albion
- Size: 70 acres (28 ha).
- No. of graves: 20,000+
- Website: Mount Albion Cemetery
- Find a Grave: Mount Albion Cemetery
- The Political Graveyard: Mount Albion Cemetery
- Mount Albion Cemetery
- U.S. National Register of Historic Places
- U.S. Historic district
- Architect: Marvin Porter
- NRHP reference No.: 76001261
- Added to NRHP: September 27, 1976

Mount Albion Cemetery is located on New York State Route 31 in the Town of Albion, New York, United States, east of the village of Albion, which owns and operates it. It is a rural cemetery established in the 1840s on a glacial drumlin.

From its original 25 acres (10 ha), it has almost tripled in size. Graves are on terraces in the rolling terrain. Tall trees, including some locally rare species, maintain a parklike atmosphere. Its notable monuments include a local Civil War memorial, a chapel and entrance arch. The dead buried there include Rufus Bullock, the first Republican Governor of Georgia and nine congressmen from two other states beside New York.

In 1976 it was listed on the National Register of Historic Places as a historic district. It was the first property in Orleans County listed on the Register, and is so far the only one in the Town of Albion.

== Grounds ==
The cemetery is a 70-acre (28 ha) rectangular parcel on the south side of Route 31 between the Butts and Keitel Road intersections, 1.5 miles (2.4 km) east of the village of Albion. Its terrain is gently rolling, dominated by a 680-foot (210 m) hill in the southeast quadrant. The area is rural, with the cemetery's sandstone office and barn located opposite its main entrance, near another smaller cemetery across the street. Immediately west of the lot is a small business. On all other sides the cemetery is surrounded by open lots and worked fields.

The northern three-quarters of the property has tall mature deciduous trees sheltering most of the graves; the southern quarter is open. Among the trees are a rare yucca and one of the few butternuts in the area. Rows of evergreens are located north and south of the hilltop; on the south the land is still wooded and not yet used for burials.

A network of paved roads, many named after trees and shrubs, runs through the cemetery. The rises in the terrain are terraced to allow for level gravesites. There are three entrances from Route 31; the central one across from the cemetery offices is the main entrance. It is framed by a carved Medina sandstone arch with a slate roof and iron gates. A short distance south is a small parking lot and sandstone chapel, a Gothic building with steep gabled roof shingled in slate.

External videos
- Walking – Down the Mt. Albion Cemetery Tower

Atop the hill in the southeast quadrant is the cylindrical 58-foot-foot high (18 m) Soldiers and Sailors Monument, also of red ("Medina") sandstone. A pointed-arched door on the north side opens to a spiral staircase climbing to the overlook at the top, which offers 360-degree views of the surrounding countryside.

In the northwest corner of the cemetery is a small square pond fed by a natural spring. It is trimmed with blocks which are made out of cement by the local cement company that was in Albion to look like sandstone, red ("Medina") sandstone and granite. On its south side is a domed cement block (made to look like sandstone) spring house with "1908" carved into it made out of the same cement blocks as the pond.

== History ==
Mt. Albion was established 12 years after Mount Auburn Cemetery in Massachusetts popularized the rural cemetery, where graves were located in a park-like setting outside an urban area. Arad Thomas and Lorenzo Burrows were tasked with revising the village charter so that land outside of the village limits could be purchased for use a municipal cemetery. Instead of adding amendments to the charter, the committee redrafted the entire document, which was passed by the New York State Legislature on April 1, 1842. Soon after, the citizens of Albion selected Lorenzo Burrows and Alexis Ward to locate a parcel of land on which a new municipal cemetery could be established. A suitable location sitting on 25 acres of forested hills and rolling meadows atop a sandy drumlin were selected and purchased for $40 per acre from Jacob Annis and Lyman O. Patterson. A former engineer on the Erie Canal, Marvin Porter, was hired to design the landscape in the eastern, oldest portion of the cemetery.

To cover the initial cost of the land, lots were sold at auction where wealthy citizens purchased graves on prominent locations overlooking the main entrance to the cemetery; Lorenzo Burrows purchased lot number one. The cemetery was dedicated on September 7, 1843 in the presence of thousands of local residents who listened to a public address by Daniel Cady, Esq. Oversight of the cemetery fell under the responsibility of the village president and board of trustees while lot owners were tasked with caring for and improving their graves. In 1862, after nearly two decades of poor upkeep and minimal improvements, the village board of trustees appointed three commissioners to oversee the cemetery; Lorenzo Burrows, Lemuel C. Paine, and Henry J. Sickels. Upon their appointment, the commissioners hired the cemetery's first caretaker, Michael Hanley, who was responsible for maintaining the cemetery grounds.

In 1874 and additional 13.5 acres were added to the west of the original cemetery boundary and a rudimentary receiving vault was added. The following year, the Gothic Revival cemetery chapel was constructed of locally quarried Medina Sandstone at a cost of $3,000 by A. Harris and R. Romp. The structure's design was completed by Charles Diem, a local marble dealer operating with Norman S. Field in Albion. Atop the cemetery's highest point, the Soldiers & Sailors Monument was erected between 1874 and 1876 to the memory of local soldiers who died during the Civil War.

On June 1, 1883, a committee led by David Hardie met to select a fifty square foot lot for the interment of Civil War veterans. Four years later, Hiram Curtis Post GAR appointed a committee to secure the removal of veterans from the potter's field within Mt. Albion Cemetery to the veterans lot. The local GAR posts assisted in relocated ten other bodies to the lot by November 9, 1887 while securing new headstones for each veteran. On May 28, 1885, a flag pole and cannon were dedicated on the site. The M1841 six pounder bronze howitzer was cast by the Ames Foundry at Springfield, Massachusetts and inspected by Capt. William Maynadier, ordinance inspector at the Maryland arsenal.

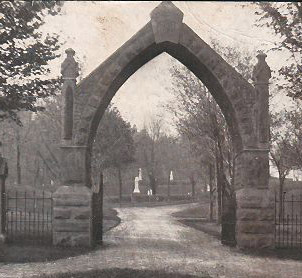
The entry arch, ca. 1908

By 1894 the cemetery had reached its present size. As it expanded, the park-like atmosphere was maintained. The rises were terraced with the dells between them kept flat. Trees and shrubs similar to those in the eastern half were planted, some in an orchard. Further park amenities, such as the 1908 pond and the Ingersoll Memorial Fountain in front of the chapel in 1914, were added.

== Notable burials ==
A number of politicians, from New York and other states, are buried at Mount Albion.

- Rufus Bullock (1834–1907), former lieutenant colonel in the Confederate Army and the first Republican governor of Georgia during Reconstruction.
- Lorenzo Burrows, (1805–1885), served two terms in the U.S. House from New York. Later served as state comptroller and ran for governor.
- John Curtis Chamberlain, (1772–1834), Harvard graduate and lawyer who served in New Hampshire House of Representatives for one term in the early 19th century, then the U.S. House as a Federalist for a term. After another term in the New Hampshire House, moved to upstate New York.
- Sanford E. Church (1815–1880), Lieutenant Governor of New York, also state comptroller and chief judge of the New York State Court of Appeals.
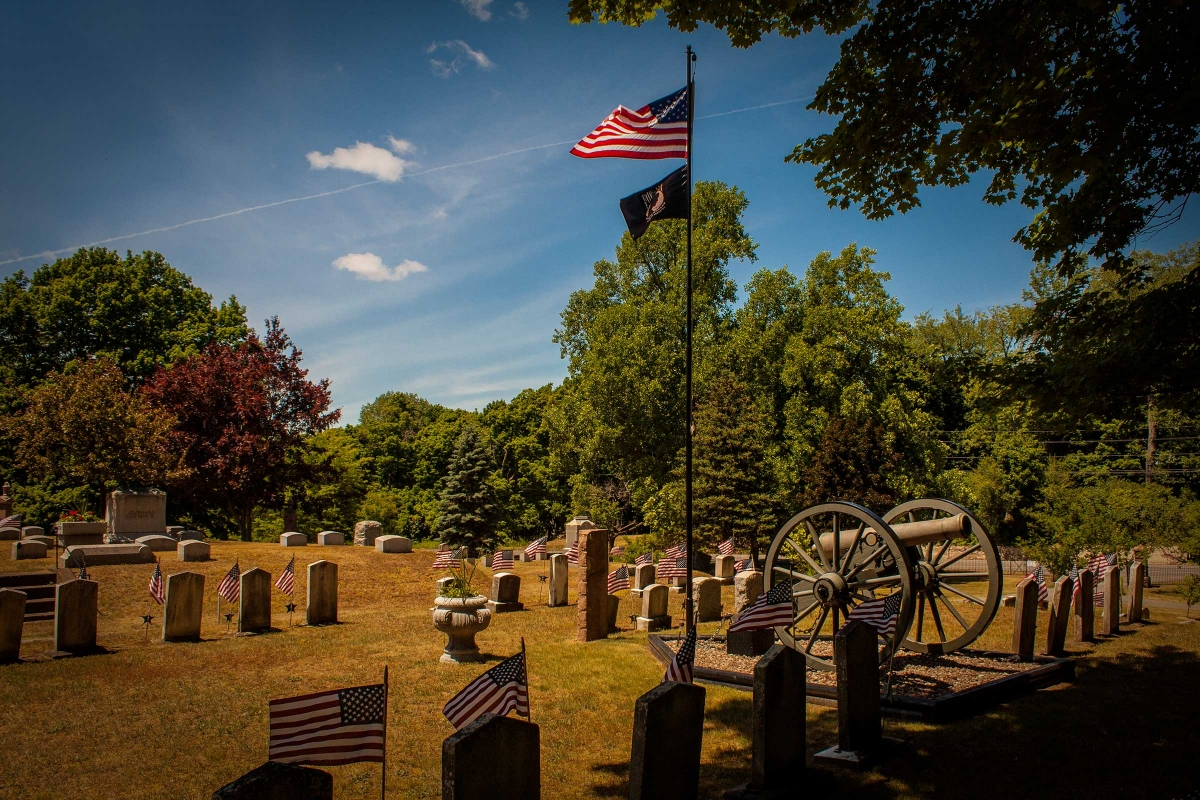
- Lot for Civil War veterans selected in 1883.
  Noah Davis, (1818–1902), one-term U.S. Representative from New York. Later presided over Boss Tweed trials as U.S. Attorney for Southern New York.
- Gilbert De La Matyr, (1825–1892), Methodist Episcopal Church elder who served a single term as U.S. Representative from Indiana after the Civil War.
- Ben Field, (1816–1876), single term in State Senate.
- Gideon Hard, (1797–1885), single-term U.S. Representative from New York who later served in state senate and as judge.
- Elizur Kirke Hart, (1841–1893), U.S. Representative and state assemblyman.
- Charles Horace Holmes, (1827–1874), U.S. Representative from New York.
- Edwin Ruthvin Reynolds, (1816–1908), U.S. Representative from New York and state judge.
- Donna Strickland Rodden, (1926–1985), first woman mayor of Albion (one of the chapel windows is dedicated to her).
- John Gilbert Sawyer, (1825–1898), U.S. Representative from New York.

== See also ==
- National Register of Historic Places listings in Orleans County, New York
