= Albion, Orleans County, New York =

Albion
- Town
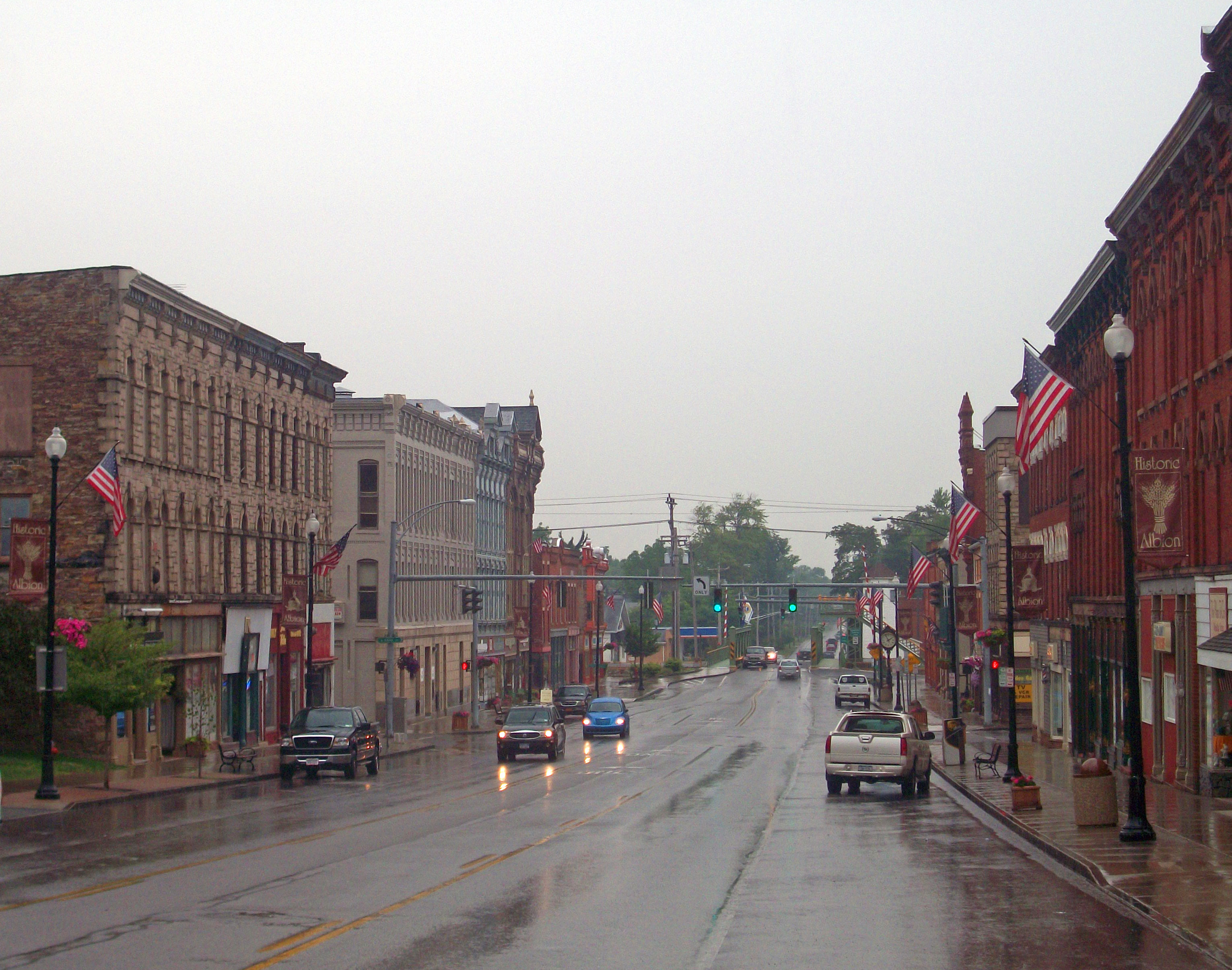
- Downtown Albion, NY

- Location in Orleans County and the state of New York.

- Location of New York in the United States
- Coordinates: 43°14′45″N 78°11′38″W
- Country: United States
- State: New York
- County: Orleans County
- Incorporated: 1875

Government
  - Supervisor: F. Richard Remley

Area
  - Total: 25.35 sq mi (65.66 km^{2})
  - Land: 25.26 sq mi (65.42 km^{2})
  - Water: 0.093 sq mi (0.24 km^{2})
- Elevation: 600 ft (180 m)

Population (2010)
  - Total: 8,230
  - Estimate (2019): 7,982
  - Density: 328.8/sq mi (126.94/km^{2})
- Time zone: UTC-5 (EST)
  - Summer (DST): UTC-4 (EDT)
- ZIP code: 14411
- Area code: 585
- FIPS code: 36-073-01044
- Website: www.townofalbion.com

Albion (/ˈæl.biː.ən/ AL-bee-ən) is a town in Orleans County, New York, United States. The population was 7,639 at the 2020 census. The town was named after a village in the town.

The Town of Albion is centrally located in the county and contains most of the village of Albion, the county seat (the northern part of the village is in the adjacent town of Gaines).

== History ==
The Town of Albion was created in 1875 by the division of the Town of Barre. The population in 1890 was 1,304.

Mount Albion Cemetery was listed on the National Register of Historic Places in 1976.

== Geography ==
According to the United States Census Bureau, the town has a total area of 25.4 square miles (65.7 km^{2}), of which 25.2 square miles (65.3 km^{2}) is land and 0.1 square mile (0.3 km^{2}) (0.47%) is water.

The Erie Canal passes through the town.

New York State Route 31A and New York State Route 98 intersect near the south town line, and New York State Route 31 passes across the town east to west.

== Climate ==
According to the Köppen Climate Classification system, Albion has a hot-summer humid continental climate, abbreviated "Dfa" on climate maps. The hottest temperature recorded in Albion was 101 °F (38.3 °C) on August 26, 1948, September 3, 1953, and July 8, 1988, while the coldest temperature recorded was −20 °F (−28.9 °C) on February 18, 1979.

Climate data for Albion, New York, 1991–2020 normals, extremes 1938–present
Month	Jan	Feb	Mar	Apr	May	Jun	Jul	Aug	Sep	Oct	Nov	Dec	Year
Record high °F (°C)	73 (23)	74 (23)	80 (27)	90 (32)	94 (34)	96 (36)	101 (38)	101 (38)	101 (38)	88 (31)	80 (27)	75 (24)	101 (38)
Mean maximum °F (°C)	54.7 (12.6)	53.0 (11.7)	67.0 (19.4)	78.3 (25.7)	85.6 (29.8)	89.9 (32.2)	91.3 (32.9)	90.3 (32.4)	87.5 (30.8)	79.3 (26.3)	68.5 (20.3)	57.3 (14.1)	92.7 (33.7)
Mean daily maximum °F (°C)	33.3 (0.7)	35.1 (1.7)	44.3 (6.8)	57.4 (14.1)	70.0 (21.1)	78.7 (25.9)	82.7 (28.2)	81.0 (27.2)	74.6 (23.7)	61.8 (16.6)	49.5 (9.7)	38.5 (3.6)	58.9 (14.9)
Daily mean °F (°C)	25.4 (−3.7)	26.6 (−3.0)	34.8 (1.6)	46.6 (8.1)	58.3 (14.6)	67.7 (19.8)	72.2 (22.3)	70.6 (21.4)	64.0 (17.8)	52.5 (11.4)	41.3 (5.2)	31.3 (−0.4)	49.3 (9.6)
Mean daily minimum °F (°C)	17.6 (−8.0)	18.0 (−7.8)	25.3 (−3.7)	35.7 (2.1)	46.5 (8.1)	56.8 (13.8)	61.8 (16.6)	60.2 (15.7)	53.5 (11.9)	43.2 (6.2)	33.0 (0.6)	24.2 (−4.3)	39.7 (4.3)
Mean minimum °F (°C)	−0.3 (−17.9)	0.8 (−17.3)	7.2 (−13.8)	23.7 (−4.6)	33.1 (0.6)	43.7 (6.5)	51.0 (10.6)	49.2 (9.6)	40.0 (4.4)	29.9 (−1.2)	19.1 (−7.2)	7.5 (−13.6)	−2.9 (−19.4)
Record low °F (°C)	−17 (−27)	−20 (−29)	−5 (−21)	9 (−13)	26 (−3)	33 (1)	43 (6)	39 (4)	30 (−1)	22 (−6)	5 (−15)	−11 (−24)	−20 (−29)
Average precipitation inches (mm)	3.04 (77)	2.30 (58)	2.69 (68)	3.25 (83)	2.98 (76)	2.96 (75)	3.23 (82)	2.75 (70)	3.22 (82)	3.43 (87)	2.68 (68)	2.71 (69)	35.24 (895)
Average snowfall inches (cm)	19.5 (50)	17.3 (44)	12.8 (33)	1.9 (4.8)	0.0 (0.0)	0.0 (0.0)	0.0 (0.0)	0.0 (0.0)	0.0 (0.0)	0.2 (0.51)	4.0 (10)	11.3 (29)	67.0 (170)
Average precipitation days (≥ 0.01 in)	14.4	11.9	10.8	12.6	11.0	11.0	9.9	10.6	10.6	13.1	13.1	13.6	142.6
Average snowy days (≥ 0.1 in)	9.3	7.7	4.2	1.0	0.0	0.0	0.0	0.0	0.0	0.0	2.4	6.8	31.4
Source 1: NOAA
Source 2: National Weather Service

== Demographics ==
Historical population
Census	Pop.	Note	%±
1830	669		—
1840	1,503		124.7%
1850	2,010		33.7%
1860	2,348		16.8%
1870	2,359		0.5%
1880	2,569		8.9%
1890	2,172		−15.5%
1900	1,724		−20.6%
1910	1,472		−14.6%
1920	1,288		−12.5%
1930	1,175		−8.8%
1940	1,094		−6.9%
1950	1,036		−5.3%
1960	1,125		8.6%
1970	1,452		29.1%
1980	1,730		19.1%
1990	2,043		18.1%
2000	2,083		2.0%
2010	2,073		−0.5%
2020	7,639		268.5%
U.S. Decennial Census

As of the census of 2010, there were 8,468 people, 2,559 households, and 1,564 families residing in the town. There were 2,847 housing units. The racial makeup of the town was 76.3% White, 17.6% Black or African American, 0.6% Native American, 0.5% Asian, 2.3% from other races, and 2.6% from two or more races. Hispanic or Latino of any race were 7.4% of the population.

There were 2,559 households, out of which 28.9% had children under the age of 18 living with them, 39.3% were married couples living together, 15.6% had a female householder with no husband present, and 38.9% were non-families. 31.1% of all households were made up of individuals, and 12.7% had someone living alone who was 65 years of age or older. The average household size was 2.48 and the average family size was 3.11.

The median income for a household in the town was $39,986.00. About 16.9% of the population were below the poverty line.

== Government ==
As of January 1, 2026, the Town Board membership is as follows:

- Town Supervisor: F. Richard Remley (R) (2018–present).
- Deputy Supervisor: Darlene Benton (D).
- Town Councilperson: Terry Wilbert (D).
- Town Councilperson: Arnold R. Allen, Jr. (R).
- Town Councilperson: Sandra Bensley (R).
- Town Clerk: Kim Hazel.
- Town Highway Superintendent: Michael Neidert (D/R).
- Town Justice: Gary Moore (D).
- Town Justice: Joseph Fuller (R).

Former Town of Albion Supervisors include: Matt Passarell (R) (2014–17), Dennis Stirk (D) (2012-13), Judith Koehler (I) (2007–11), Eugene Christopher (R) (1999-07), Edward Sharping (R), Dr. John Fernandez (R), and Arthur Eddy (R).

== Communities and locations in the Town of Albion ==
- Albion – The Village of Albion, the county seat, is at the junction of NY-31 and NY-98 at the north town line.
- Albion Correctional Facility – A New York prison for women is west of Albion village on NY Route 31.
- Bentons Corners – A former location south of Albion village.
- Eagle Harbor Station – A hamlet west of Albion village.
- Orleans Correctional Facility – A NY state prison.
- Orleans County Sheriff's Office – The headquarters of the county's sheriffs office is located in the town.
- Riches Corners – A hamlet in the southeast part of the town.
