= National Register of Historic Places listings in Orleans County, New York =

List of properties and districts listed on the National Register of Historic Places

Location of Orleans County in New York

This is intended to be a complete list of properties and districts listed on the National Register of Historic Places in Orleans County, New York. The locations of National Register properties and districts (at least for all showing latitude and longitude coordinates below) may be seen in a map by clicking on "Map of all coordinates". (Note: The latitude and longitude information provided in this table was derived originally from the National Register Information System, which has been found to be fairly accurate for about 99% of listings. Some locations in this table may have been corrected to current GPS standards.) Two listings, the New York State Barge Canal and the Cobblestone Historic District, are further designated a National Historic Landmark.

There are currently 31 listings in the county, the fourth fewest in the state after Schuyler County (19), Hamilton County (22) and Genesee County (23). Seven of the listings are historic districts, including Mount Albion Cemetery (Millville Cemetery is classified as a site). The remaining 20 are individual buildings. No structures in the county are yet listed on the National Register.

This National Park Service list is complete through NPS recent listings posted November 6, 2026.

Contents: Counties in New York
Albany (Albany) – Allegany – Bronx – Broome – Cattaraugus – Cayuga – Chautauqua – Chemung – Chenango – Clinton – Columbia – Cortland – Delaware – Dutchess (Poughkeepsie, Rhinebeck) – Erie (Buffalo) – Essex – Franklin – Fulton – Genesee – Greene – Hamilton – Herkimer – Jefferson – Kings – Lewis – Livingston – Madison – Monroe (Rochester) – Montgomery – Nassau – New York (Below 14th Street, 14th to 59th Streets, 59th to 110th Streets, Above 110th Street, Islands) – Niagara (Niagara Falls) – Oneida – Onondaga (Syracuse) – Ontario – Orange – Orleans – Oswego – Otsego – Putnam – Queens – Rensselaer – Richmond – Rockland – St. Lawrence – Saratoga – Schenectady – Schoharie – Schuyler – Seneca – Steuben – Suffolk – Sullivan – Tioga – Tompkins – Ulster – Warren – Washington – Wayne – Westchester (Northern, Southern, New Rochelle, Peekskill, Yonkers) – Wyoming – Yates

== Overview ==
Of the 20 buildings, at least 10 have been used as dwellings at some point in their history. Two (Note: Skinner-Tinkham House and Cobblestone Inn) of those were originally inns that have since become residences. The Tousley-Church House was later converted into the local Daughters of the American Revolution chapter offices. The four conventional historic districts (Note: Excluding Mt. Albion Cemetery.) all include some residential properties as well among their contributing properties.

Three other buildings—the Albion and Medina post offices and the Medina Armory—are government buildings. The armory is now used by the local YMCA. No commercial buildings in Orleans County are individually listed on the Register. Nor are any religious buildings, although seven churches contribute to the Orleans County Courthouse Historic District and one to the Cobblestone Historic District. No educational buildings were listed on their own until 2017, when the Gaines District No. 2 Cobblestone Schoolhouse was listed; however, the Cobblestone Historic District includes an old one-room schoolhouse among its contributing properties.

In the five districts, there are 135 buildings on 104 acres (42 ha). Most of that acreage is accounted for by Mt. Albion Cemetery, the largest listing in the county at 70 acres (28 ha). The Cobblestone Historic District, with three buildings on two discontiguous plots totaling three-quarters of an acre (3,000 m^{2}), is the smallest district and the smallest National Historic Landmark District in New York.

The other three districts are in the downtowns of Medina and Albion, the largest settlements in the county. The two Albion districts abut each other, with the southerly being characterized by the public buildings, churches and residences around the county courthouse while the northerly is primarily commercial. Medina's Main Street Historic District is almost all commercial property.

All but three of the buildings (and one structure (Note: A small park within the North Main-Bank Streets Historic District in Albion, built on the site of a building that burned.)) within the historic districts are considered contributing properties. None of the contributing properties are themselves listed individually on the Register. However, the Albion post office, within the bounds of the county courthouse historic district, is not considered a contributing property to it despite later being listed on the Register, since it was built two decades after the district's period of significance.

== Listings county-wide ==
This National Park Service list is complete through NPS recent listings posted November 6, 2026.

Legend: National Register of Historic Places listing National Historic Landmark Historic district National Historic Landmark District

	Name on the Register	Image	Date listed	Location	City or town	Description
1	Bacon–Harding Farm	Bacon–Harding Farm	February 27, 2013 (#13000041)	3077 Oak Orchard Road; 43°16′02″N 78°11′31″W	Gaines	200-year-old farm still owned by the same family; centered around 1844 cobblestone Greek Revival farmhouse
2	William V. N. Barlow House	William V. N. Barlow House	September 8, 1983 (#83001757)	223 S. Clinton St. 43°14′22″N 78°11′47″W	Albion	Barlow, architect of many important buildings in downtown Albion, including the county courthouse, built this eclectic home for himself in 1875. Its rear yard has one of the village's few remaining hand-pumped wells.
3	Jackson Blood Cobblestone House	Jackson Blood Cobblestone House	June 30, 2005 (#05000635)	142 S. Main St. 43°19′00″N 78°23′22″W	Lyndonville	The Blood family is supposed to have built this sophisticated 1846 Greek Revival cobblestone house by hauling the stones down from Lake Ontario themselves.
4	Boxwood Cemetery	Boxwood Cemetery	January 27, 2015 (#14001216)	3717 N. Gravel Rd. 43°14′04″N 78°23′59″W	Medina	Small cemetery started in 1860s where many of city's original settlers are buried
5	Butterfield Cobblestone House	Butterfield Cobblestone House	March 1, 2010 (#10000044)	4690 Bennetts Corners Rd. 43°11′19″N 78°01′02″W	Clarendon	This 1849 Greek Revival cobblestone house is the only such structure in Clarendon. It is considered the finest building in that style in county.
6	T.O. Castle and Son General Store	T.O. Castle and Son General Store	January 25, 2023 (#100008604)	12348 Maple Ridge Rd. 43°12′28″N 78°19′30″W	Millville	
7	Childs Historic District		February 6, 2025 (#100011442)	Portions of Ridge Road and Oak Orchard Road; 43°17′12″N 78°11′30″W	Childs	
8	Clarendon Stone Store	Clarendon Stone Store	May 9, 2012 (#12000258)	16301 E. Lee Rd. 43°11′38″N 78°03′53″W	Clarendon	General store, an early use of Medina sandstone. Also known as the "Old Stone Store", or the "Copeland Store".
9	Cobblestone Historic District	Cobblestone Historic District	April 1, 1993 (#93001603)	Ridge Rd. (NY 104); 43°17′13″N 78°11′24″W	Childs	Orleans County's only National Historic Landmark, and the state's smallest NHL district, consists of three 19th-century cobblestone buildings reflecting style at its highest in different periods. They include the state's oldest known cobblestone church and its parsonage, as well as one of only two buildings with cobblestone veneer over wood frame.
10	Cobblestone Inn	Cobblestone Inn	July 24, 2007 (#07000755)	12226 Ridge Rd. 43°16′28″N 78°19′59″W	Oak Orchard on-the-Ridge	This 1837 tavern, which one served traffic on the Ridge Road, is possibly the largest cobblestone building in the state. It later became a restaurant and is now a residential duplex
11	Fancher World War II Memorial	Fancher World War II Memorial	August 3, 2022 (#100007953)	Southwest corner of NY 31 and Fancher Rd. 43°14′39″N 78°05′28″W	Murray	World War II memorial made of Medina Sandstone at Fancher Curve. Dedicated in August 1949.
12	Gaines District No. 2 Cobblestone Schoolhouse	Gaines District No. 2 Cobblestone Schoolhouse	June 12, 2017 (#100001070)	3286 Gaines Basin Rd. 43°15′26″N 78°13′25″W	Gaines	Intact 1832 schoolhouse built to handle population influx after completion of Erie Canal; restoration completed in 2015–16.
13	Benjamin Franklin Gates House	Benjamin Franklin Gates House	June 4, 2009 (#09000378)	13079 W. Lee Rd. 43°12′10″N 78°16′43″W	Barre	Gates, a pioneering settler of Barre, built this Greek Revival stacked-plank house and the region's first tannery around 1830. New owners restored it in the early 21st century; it is still a working farm.
14	Hillside Cemetery	Hillside Cemetery	June 25, 2013 (#13000450)	NY 237 & S. Holley Rd. 43°12′57″N 78°01′54″W	Clarendon	Resting place of many early settlers of town later adapted into rural cemetery
15	Holley Village Historic District	Holley Village Historic District	August 24, 2015 (#15000539)	1 Village Sq., 3-35 Frisbe Terrace, Public Sq., 32-34 Albion, 1-13 S. Main, 1 Wright, 2 White, 1 & 4-18 Thomas Sts. 43°13′33″N 78°01′36″W	Holley	Commercial and institutional core of a village as it developed over a century following a distinctive street plan along the Erie Canal.
16	Main Street Historic District	Main Street Historic District	March 23, 1995 (#95000213)	Roughly, along Main and Center Sts., West Ave. and Proctor Pl. 43°13′13″N 78°23′13″W	Medina	When Medina came into existence following the construction of the Erie Canal, this strip from the canal to the railroad tracks was the first area of the village. Its buildings, from the 1830s to the 1940s, are relics of Medina's industrial peak years. The district was later expanded slightly to include the Medina Railroad Museum building.
17	Medina Armory	Medina Armory	April 13, 1995 (#95000399)	302 Pearl St. 43°13′19″N 78°23′32″W	Medina	This structure, built of locally quarried Medina sandstone, was George Heins' first commission as state architect in 1901. It is today the Lake Plains YMCA.
18	Millville Cemetery	Millville Cemetery	October 31, 2007 (#07001126)	E. Shelby Rd. 43°11′23″N 78°19′28″W	Millville	This exemplary 1871 rural cemetery on a small hill, expanded from earlier burying ground, is the final resting place of many residents of this former bustling agricultural hamlet.
19	Mt. Albion Cemetery	Mt. Albion Cemetery	September 27, 1976 (#76001261)	New York State Route 31; 43°14′22″N 78°09′20″W	Town of Albion	This rural cemetery was built in 1842 on a high drumlin outside of Albion. It features local Civil War monument and chapel. Among those buried here are many local politicians of the 19th century, and former Georgia governor Rufus Bullock.
20	New York State Barge Canal	New York State Barge Canal	October 15, 2014 (#14000860)	Linear across county 43°14′56″N 78°11′27″W	Albion, Gaines, Holley, Medina, Murray, Ridgeway, Shelby	Successor to Erie Canal approved by state voters in early 20th century to compete with railroads.
21	North Main-Bank Streets Historic District	North Main-Bank Streets Historic District	November 30, 1994 (#94001341)	Roughly, along N. Main, E. Bank, W. Bank and Liberty Sts. 43°14′51″N 78°11′37″W	Albion	The northerly of Albion's two downtown historic districts is one of the most intact commercial areas along the Erie Canal, with buildings from the century after its completion.
22	Orleans County Courthouse Historic District	Orleans County Courthouse Historic District	August 31, 1979 (#79001617)	Courthouse Sq. and environs 43°14′45″N 78°11′36″W	Albion	The southern downtown Albion historic district is the civic and religious center of the village and county. Centered around William Barlow's 1858 county courthouse are residential, commercial and institutional buildings, including seven churches. Many use Medina sandstone.
23	Payjack Chevrolet Building	Payjack Chevrolet Building	May 8, 2012 (#12000259)	320 N. Main St. 43°13′21″N 78°23′16″W	Medina	1949 concrete building is intact example of car dealership facility built to General Motors international standards of that era.
24	Peters House		September 21, 2026 (#100013265)	4018 Salt Works Rd; 43°13′01″N 78°24′36″W	Medina	
25	Servoss House	Servoss House	February 28, 2008 (#08000104)	3963 Fruit Ave. 43°13′00″N 78°25′51″W	Ridgeway	A former canal worker built this early 1830s Greek Revival house alongside the canal using an unusual horizontal-plank structural system.
26	John Shelp Cobblestone House	John Shelp Cobblestone House	November 20, 2008 (#08001079)	10181 West Shelby Rd. 43°09′17″N 78°27′51″W	West Shelby	In the late 19th century, the owners of this sophisticated 1836 Greek Revival cobblestone house redid the interior in the Queen Anne Style
27	Skinner-Tinkham House	Skinner-Tinkham House	April 15, 2004 (#04000291)	4652 Oak Orchard Rd. 43°11′11″N 78°11′40″W	Barre Center	This 1829 Federal-style tavern along a busy highway, later remodeled into house, is one of the county's few surviving brick buildings in that style. Restoration efforts are underway after several decades of neglect.
28	Stevens–Sommerfeldt House	Stevens–Sommerfeldt House	May 26, 2015 (#15000268)	5482 Holley-Byron Rd. 43°08′52″N 78°04′15″W	Clarendon	Rare surviving late Federal Stone House, built in 1820s
29	Tousley-Church House	Tousley-Church House	February 5, 2002 (#01001565)	249 N. Main St. 43°15′08″N 78°11′34″W	Albion	This 1840 Greek Revival house was expanded ten years later in a fashion showing strong influence of Minard Lafever. Since being renovated in the 1930s it has housed the local Daughters of the American Revolution chapter.
30	US Post Office-Albion	US Post Office-Albion	November 17, 1988 (#88002450)	8 S. Main St. 43°14′46″N 78°11′39″W	Albion	This 1937 post office uses one of more popular Colonial Revival designs for post offices in the state. It is within the Orleans County Courthouse Historic District, but not considered a contributing property to that listing since it was built after 1910.
31	US Post Office-Medina	US Post Office-Medina	May 11, 1989 (#88002351)	128 W. Center St. 43°13′14″N 78°23′19″W	Medina	The only other known reuse of this sophisticated 1931 Colonial Revival design is in Salem, Indiana.

== See also ==
- National Register of Historic Places listings in New York
