= United States Post Office (Albion, New York) =

- U.S. Post Office
- U.S. National Register of Historic Places
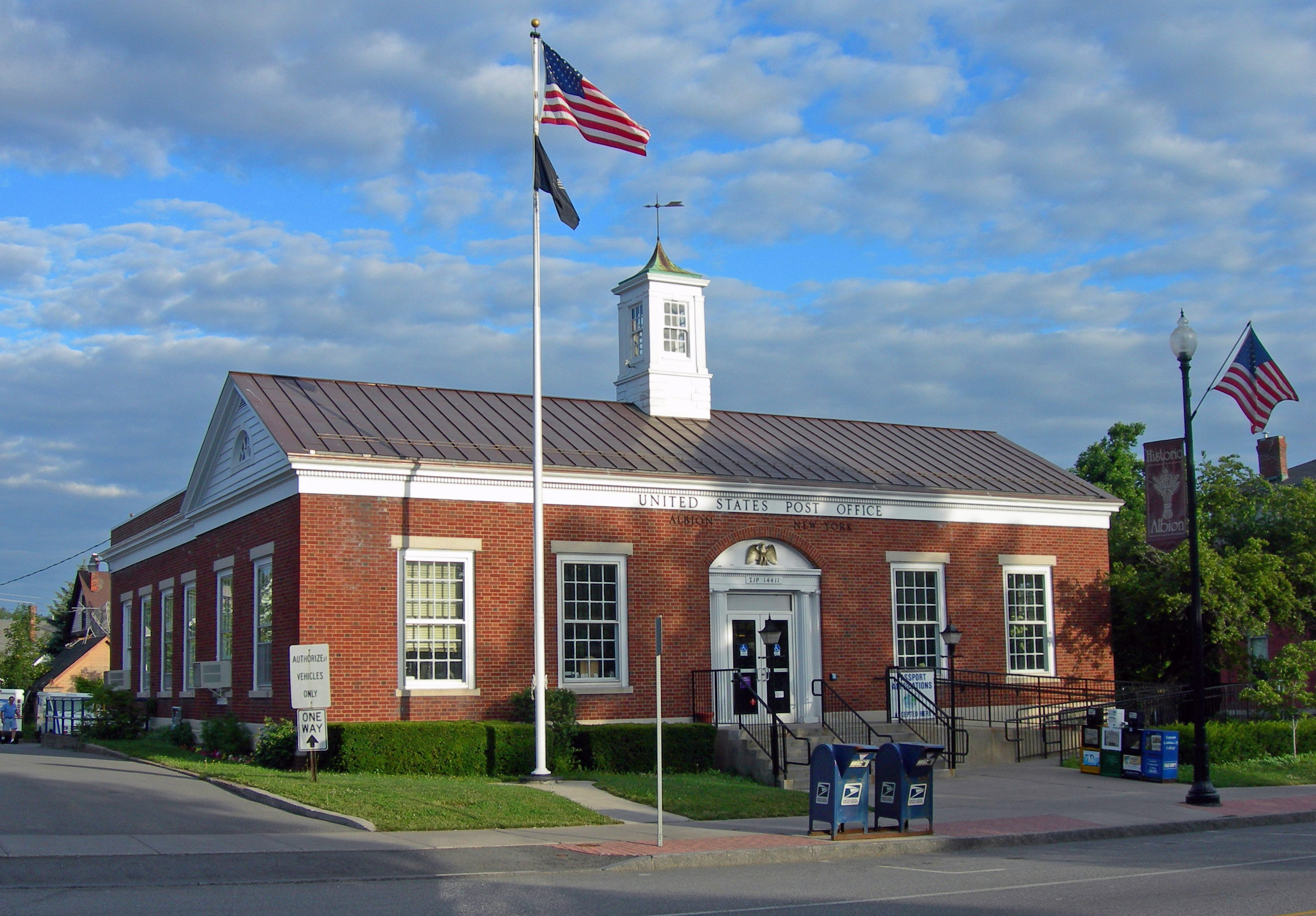
- South profile and east elevation, 2008

- Location within New York Location within the United States
- Location: 8 S. Main St., Albion, NY
- Coordinates: 43°14′45.6″N 78°11′38.7″W
- Built: 1937
- Architect: Louis Simon; Judson Smith
- Architectural style: Colonial Revival
- MPS: US Post Offices in New York State, 1858-1943, TR
- NRHP reference No.: 88002450
- Added to NRHP: November 17, 1988

The U.S. Post Office in Albion, New York, is located on South Main Street (New York State Route 98) in the center of town. It serves the 14411 ZIP Code, covering the village and town of Albion plus neighboring sections of the towns of Barre and Gaines.

It is a brick Colonial Revival building erected in the late 1930s. In the lobby is a mural of the nearby Erie Canal. It was listed on the National Register of Historic Places in 1988 along with many other present and former post offices in the state. While it is within the boundaries of the Orleans County Courthouse Historic District, it is not considered a contributing property to that district since it was built after that district's period of significance.

== Building ==
The post office is located on the southwest corner of the intersection of Main and East State streets in the center of Albion. Across from it is the county courthouse, screened by a small village green planted with mature trees. North of it is the Swan Library, an 1840 Greek Revival residence later converted into a Colonial Revival library; to the south is a former residence from the 1830s used now as the Cornell Cooperative Extension offices for the county. Across the intersection at the northeast corner is the First Presbyterian Church, a stone building with a 175-foot (53 m) steeple, the tallest structure in Orleans County. Main Street descends slightly to the north, into Albion's other historic district, the more commercial North Main-Bank Streets area, ending at the New York State Barge Canal, the former route of the Erie Canal.

The building itself is a five-bay single-story structure on a stone water table faced in brick. The main block has a gently sloped gable roof, its fields finished in clapboard. set off by a denticulated cornice at the roofline and topped with a copper roof. It is pierced at the center by a square cupola with quoins, Doric pilasters at the corners framing six-over-six sash windows and an ogival cap with weathervane. The rear wing has the cornice but is flat-roofed. It has a parapet with limestone coping.

Limestone sills and lintels frame the 12-over-12 double-hung sash windows on all facades. A single lunette is located in each gable field. In the east face's frieze, bronze letters spelling out "UNITED STATES POST OFFICE" are located above the main entrance, with "ALBION" and "NEW YORK" on the brick below flanking the entrance arch. A datestone is at the northeast corner. Granite steps with original iron railings and lampposts, joined by a modern wheelchair ramp on the north, rise to the centrally located main entrance.

The entrance is flanked by two engaged fluted Doric pilasters and columns. They support an entablature with denticulated cornice to which a later piece of wood has been affixed with metallic letters saying "ZIP 14411". Above is a blind fanlight with an aluminum eagle.

Inside the modern double doors open into a wooden vestibule articulated by narrow paneled pilasters and multi-pane sash. The main lobby floor is of red and brown ceramic tile with a red border and buff wainscoting. Above that the walls and ceiling, including the cornice between them, is plaster. Many original features, including the screenline, metal grilles, lockboxes, interior doors and surrounds, two wooden customer tables, one set of lockboxes and a bulletin case. A mural depicting ships on the canal is high on the wall above the postmaster's office.

== History ==
From its designation as the new county's seat in 1824 through its days of prosperity as a canal town and the central shipping point for the Medina sandstone quarried nearby, Albion had managed to get by without its own post office building. In the early 20th century the mail was handled out of a rented storefront on East Bank Street. By the 1920s that became outmoded, and the postal authorities decided it was time for a dedicated building.

A 1931 amendment to the Public Buildings Act of 1926 authorized the new structure as a relief measure for the Depression. Ground was not broken until 1936, after two Greek Revival houses on the site were demolished. New York City contractors Andover & Associates built the new post office for a cost of $52,699 ($1,223,000 in contemporary dollars). It opened in 1937.

Louis Simon, Supervising Architect at the Treasury Department, which had design responsibilities for most federal buildings, employed the same Colonial Revival design he had used for 12 other post offices in the state, the largest group of similar post offices across the state. This reflects both the Treasury's interest in standardization and its preference, during the Depression, for Colonial Revival as its preferred mode. The design of Albion's post office is one of the most typical of that group, lacking some of the variations found at the others.

In 1939 Judson Smith's Along the Barge Canal mural was added to the lobby. It had been commissioned after he won one the competitions held by the Treasury's Section of Fine Arts, which oversaw the public art in post offices at the time. Other than the replacement of the original lobby lighting with more modern equipment, there have been few changes to the building since then.

Six decades later, when the Orleans County Courthouse Historic District, was created, its boundaries included the post office. Along with the county jail, it was one of the only two of the 35 properties in that district considered non-contributing to its historic character since it was built after the district's 1830–1910 period of significance. When the post office was listed on the National Register itself nine years later, it remained non-contributing despite its own status.

== See also ==
- National Register of Historic Places listings in Orleans County, New York
