= North Main–Bank Streets Historic District =

Historic district in New York, United States

- U.S. National Register of Historic Places
- U.S. Historic district
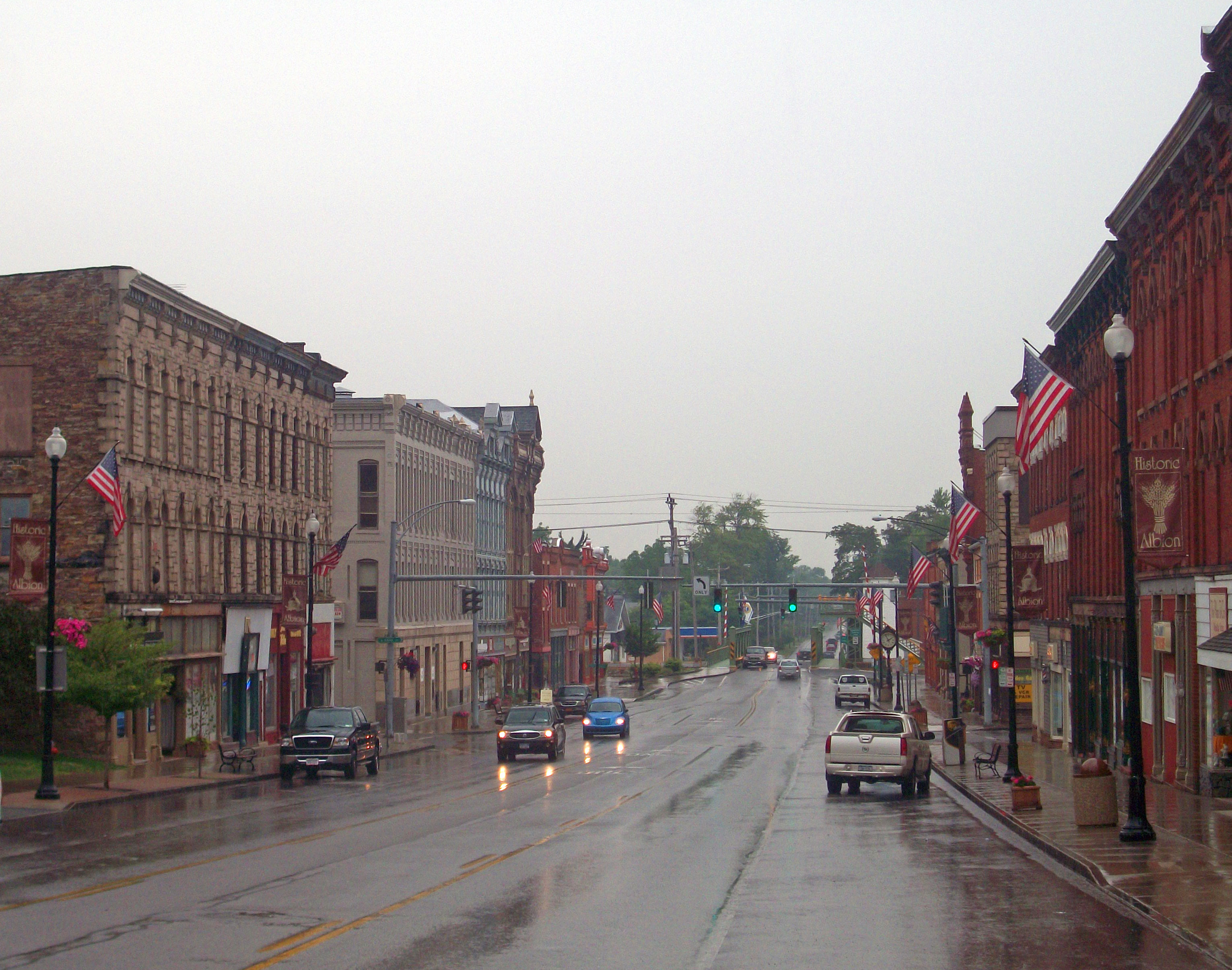
- View north along North Main Street, 2010. Swan and Granite blocks are at left.

- Location within New York Location within the United States
- Location: Albion, NY
- Nearest city: Batavia
- Coordinates: 43°14′51″N 78°11′37″W
- Area: 18 acres (7.3 ha)
- Built: 1827–1930
- Architectural style: Classical Revival, Italianate, Greek Revival
- NRHP reference No.: 94001341
- Added to NRHP: November 30, 1994

The North Main–Bank Streets Historic District is located along those streets in Albion, New York, United States. It is one of two historic districts in the village, comprising the commercial core of the village, developed during its years as a major stop on the Erie Canal. A portion of the canal, now the New York State Barge Canal, and two of its bridges are within the district.

Its buildings represent a diverse collection of architectural styles over a century of development. All but one are considered contributing properties to its historic character. They include an opera house and the village hall. It is one of the most intact commercial areas along the former canal. Many use locally quarried Medina sandstone or brick, a legacy of three destructive fires in the mid and late 19th century which destroyed earlier wood-frame buildings. In 1994, the area was recognized as a historic district and listed on the National Register of Historic Places.

== Geography ==
The district is an irregularly shaped area centered around the intersection of North Main (state highway NY 98) and East and West Bank streets. It slopes down gently toward the canal along its northern boundary. At its south end it borders on the Orleans County Courthouse Historic District, the other one in Albion. Its boundary follows lot lines and streets, including all the properties on the east of North Main north of Swan Library to the canal and bridge. At the northwest corner it includes the former Sears Carriage Factory at 125 Liberty Street, and a block of Beaver Alley.

It then includes the bridge and a portion of the canal, including a concrete prism and the former tow path, eastward to the Ingersoll Street bridge, after which it follows the south bank of the canal back west to the rear line of the Burrows Block at 131½ North Main, the only remnant of a whole row of buildings which fronted on the canal. Then it goes south and east around the village-owned parking lot to include all the buildings on the north side of East Bank Street to the village hall at the Platt Street corner. It excludes the parking lot across the street but then follows its property line south to zigzag across the block and include all the properties down to 35 North Main.

The 18-acre (7.3 ha) area within the boundary includes 43 buildings and three structures. Only one building, the modern commercial building at 18 North Main, is non-contributing. The rest are generally three-story brick or stone commercial buildings, with a few industrial buildings and houses, in a variety of 19th century styles. The area alternates dense development with open spaces for parking lots.

== History ==
The development of the district can be divided into three periods: the early years from which only a few buildings remain, the middle years in which many of the current buildings were constructed after fires, and the later years in which the focus has been on preservation.

=== 1810s–1861: The early years ===
Settlement of the future Albion area began in the early 1810s, picking up later in the decade when construction began on the Erie Canal. In 1822 large-scale development began when Nehemiah Ingersoll bought a large tract of land south of the canal on the east side of what later became Main Street. It was quickly subdivided, with a tavern and store built on Main Street, housing built along the canal route, and a dam and mill built on Sandy Creek, the nearby feeder stream.

In 1824 the canal section from Brockport to Lockport, including Albion, was completed and opened. Orleans County was created from the northern half of Genesee County, and the canal helped Albion get chosen over nearby Gaines as the county seat. When the canal was finished the next year, Albion became a bustling port, shipping mainly the wheat and apples grown in the surrounding farms. The brick Greek Revival Burrows Block at 131½ North Main, built in 1827, is the only one remaining from the canal frontage.

At the opposite end of the district, the presence of county government influenced development. As in the courthouse historic district, many of the surviving buildings from this period are residences. The oldest building in the district is the 1826 Federal style Porter Lee House at 30 North Main. Around 1830 the two oldest commercial properties, 105–107 North Main and the Goodrich-Proctor Block at 126 North Main, both brick Greek Revival structures, were built. Other residences and commercial buildings existed; most were wood frame and did not survive later fires.

In the late 1830s, a quarry operator near Medina, the next large settlement to the west along the canal, discovered an attractive reddish-brown sedimentary rock and began selling it as a building material. Medina sandstone, as it was called, would eventually be most heavily quarried around Albion, and shipped elsewhere in the state via the canal to be used later in the construction of the state capitol in Albany and many so-called brownstones in New York City. It saw its first use in the future district around 1840, when it was used to build the Sears Carriage Factory at 125 Liberty Street, one of the few surviving industrial buildings near the canal.

By the middle of the century, the trade in sandstone and farm products was making Albion prosperous. The canal was joined as a regional transportation artery by the Rochester, Lockport and Niagara Falls Railroad, locally known as the "Falls Road", soon absorbed into the New York Central, to the south. Two local businessmen, Lorenzo Burrows and Williams Swan, built large, ornate, Greek Revival houses for themselves at 34 and 48 North Main respectively. The current courthouse was built in 1858, providing another focal point to the village and a pole for development.

=== 1862–1897: Rebuilding ===
Few buildings survive from this era. In 1862 the first of three fires in the district destroyed most of the south side of East Bank between Main and Platt. The Bordwell and Harrington blocks, 16–28 East Bank, replaced them along with the now-demolished Orleans Hotel. These new buildings were Italianate structures built of brick, the better to survive future fires.

Four years later, in 1866, the block of North Main just south of West Bank burned. It was replaced by the Blott, Royce and Empire blocks. At the north end of the rebuilt area was the Granite Block, partially constructed of Medina sandstone. Its design influenced that of neighboring buildings on West Bank built shortly afterwards, in the same style. Seven years later, in 1873, the village built a combination fire station and village hall at 35–37 East Bank, in the eastern corner of the future district. Its decorative facade combined brick and Medina sandstone.

The last fire, in 1882, burned the block of North Main between West Bank and Beaver Alley. The new buildings — the Granite and Day & Day blocks and the Pratt Opera House — were some of the district's most distinctive. They employed brick and Medina sandstone in various combinations of late Victorian styles: Italianate, Eastlake and Romanesque Revival. Atop the Day & Day and opera house pedimented parapets broke up the continuous flat skyline of that side of Main Street. The Daly and Hanley buildings, built at the north end of the block in 1897, continued this trend.

Albion's prosperity continued into the 20th century. Few new buildings were built as the existing buildings remained in good shape. The Independent Order of Odd Fellows hall at 10 North Main, the district's south end, was put up in 1907. The Renaissance Revival bank building at 121 North Main was built in 1895 and further renovated in the 1920s. The last major building was the Strick Building at 31 East Bank, a sandstone commercial structure erected in 1923.

=== 1898–1994: Buildout and decline ===
During this period the economy began to decline slightly. Improvements in railroad technology had made them more efficient than the canals, so the state responded by combining the Erie and several other canals into the New York State Barge Canal system. The canal was rerouted entirely in some areas, but in Albion it was merely widened and dredged. The two lift bridges in the district were built during this period, which ended around 1930.

The improvements to the canal sufficed for only a few more years. Demand for Medina sandstone had been declining in the face of competition from Portland cement, and it was desired only for curbstones. In the late 1940s, that ceased as most easily accessible beds of the material had been exhausted. Albion also suffered when the New York State Thruway was opened to the south, near Batavia, displacing both canal and rail as a freight route.

Businesses closed down, but the buildings they were in were not demolished. The listing of the courthouse historic district to the south gave impetus to efforts to preserve and restore the commercial area as well. The district was determined eligible for the National Register in 1986; that was changed when the north side of East Bank between Platt and Ingersoll, originally intended to be included, was found to have too many alterations and modern intrusions to retain its historic integrity. The village created a Historic Preservation Commission (HPC) to oversee its historic districts. It is charged with protecting and enhancing the landmarks within them and making the village more attractive to visitors in order to ensure growth and development.

=== 1995–present: Preservation battles ===
Citizens formed the Albion Main Street Alliance (AMSA) to work to revitalize Albion's downtown, in particular the district. They advocated for a fouRr-point approach used in similar communities across the country: organization, promotion, design and economic restructuring. Specific projects undertaken include beautification such as placing American flags on the street and litter cleanup in Canal Park, taking photographic inventory and mapping the buildings within the district, and organizing community events and education programs related to it. It has been accredited by the National Trust for Historic Preservation, which gave the village a three-year grant to restore facades in 2008.

The HPC clashed with the village's mayor, Mike Hadick, over its denial that year of a sign permit. Commission members felt that a sign Verizon wanted to use on its Main Street store was inappropriate for an area with buildings over a century old, and that it probably had less intrusive signs available to it. Hadick felt that the commission, which he felt had also been insufficiently supportive when the village tried to restore the rear wall of its visitors' center at 121 Main Street, was creating unnecessary obstacles for businesses in a difficult economy. He later granted the permit himself, which the HPC said was beyond his authority. Late in the year he asked four of the seven members to step down since they had not taken their oaths of office within the required 30 days, leaving the commission without a quorum and unable to take action. He said he would take applications from the community for new members instead of reappointing the four, who said they had never been told of the need to take the oath. At a village board meeting early in 2009, Hadick responded to a presentation about the benefits of the historic district by saying he would prefer the demolition of most of the historic properties along Main Street in favor of new ones, claiming that the "outdated" buildings drove young adults from the village. Members of AMSA and the HPC were critical of his attitude and actions.

In the spring, AMSA organized the Olde Orleans Erie Canal Festival to promote the district as part of a corridor of historic and scenic attractions along Route 98, ranging from the nearby courthouse to the Cobblestone National Historic Landmark District and Oak Orchard Lighthouse Museum north of town along the highway. The event included historic re-enactments and building tours. Local artists and organizations exhibited in the Pratt Building, as well.

A month later, Hadick resigned as mayor and Dean Theodorakos, one of the HPC members and a village trustee, was chosen by the board to replace him. Theodorakos moved later that year to have the village apply for Certified Local Government (CLG) status from the National Park Service in order to better protect the historic district. Julian Adams, coordinator of the CLG program for the State Historic Preservation Office, said Albion was an ideal community for the program. "I was blown away by your downtown," he told a meeting of village officials and interested citizens. "You have wonderful buildings here that no one else has", due to the lack of any urban renewal efforts in the village.

In 2010, the commission had to start its work over again when it discovered that the historic district had never been formally established under local law. Almost ten years earlier, public hearings required by law had been held, but the resulting documentation was never filed with the county clerk's office and could not be located in village archives. That gave the commission an opportunity to consider expanding the district recognized in the village code to include properties outside the Register district, such as residences on some of the side streets and property north of the canal.

== Significant contributing properties ==
All but one property (18 North Main Street) are considered contributing to the district's historic character. None are as yet individually listed on the National Register.

- Burrows Block, 123–131½ North Main Street. The oldest section of this brick Greek Revival building, constructed in several stages in the 1830s, is the only remaining canalside commercial building.
- Lorenzo Burrows House, 48 North Main. One of the two large Greek Revival houses in the district, dating to 1840.
- Citizen's Bank Building, 121 North Main. The only Renaissance Revival building in the district was finished in 1895 and redone in the 1920s.
- Granite Block, 52–60 North Main. This Italianate building of Medina sandstone laid in a random ashlar pattern after the 1866 fire influenced several others around it.
- Lee Porter House, 30 North Main Street. This 1826 brick Federal style house, later given some Italianate touches, is the oldest in the district.
- Pratt Opera House, 120 North Main. A three-story Romanesque Revival 1882 building, its third-story pedimented cross-gable and roof accommodate an intact theater.
- Sears Carriage Factory, 125 Liberty Street. A small, utilitarian brick building dating to 1840 and expanded twice since then, this is one of the few remaining industrial buildings near the canal on the south side.
- W.G. Swan House, 34 North Main. This is the other large 1840s brick Greek Revival house built by an early canal businessman.
- Village Hall and firehouse, 35–37 East Bank Street. An ornate structure dating to 1873 that continues to serve in both capacities.

== See also ==
- National Register of Historic Places listings in Orleans County, New York

== Gallery ==
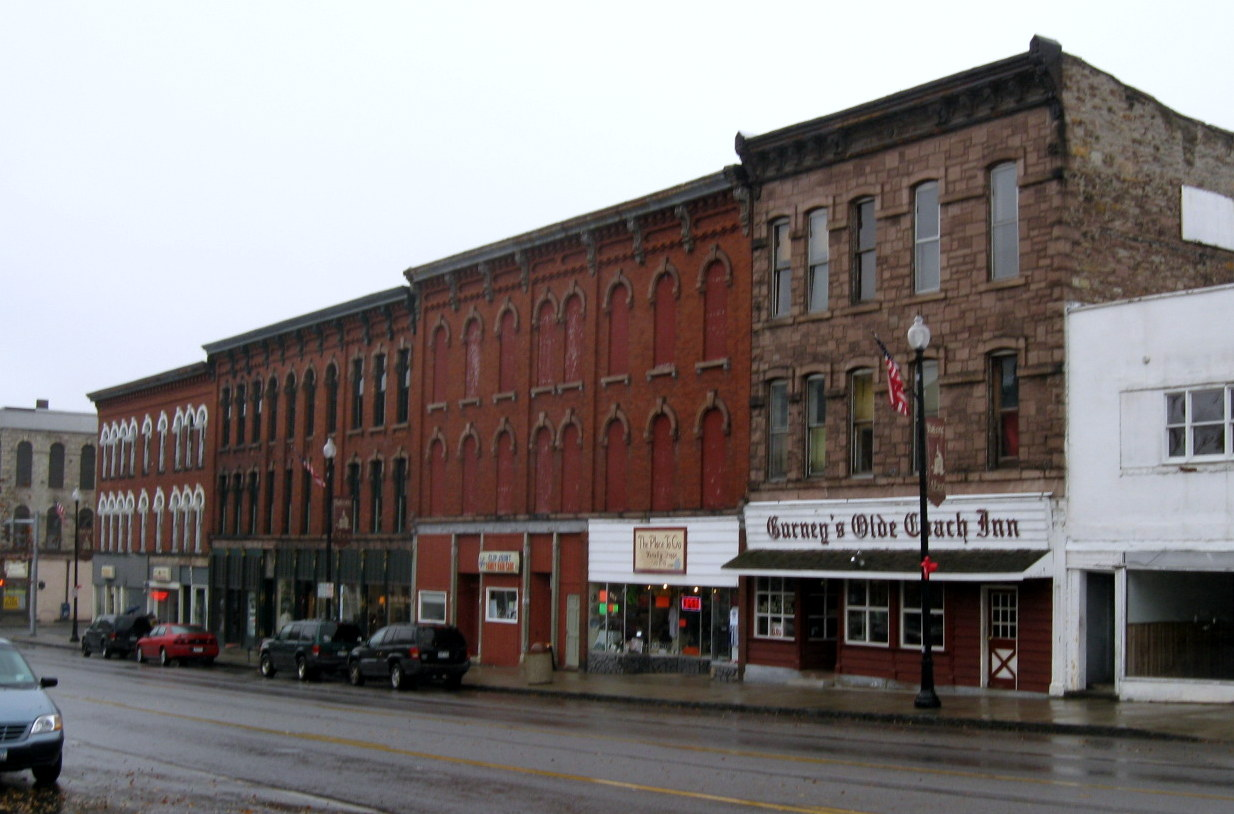
35-59 N. Main St., October 2009

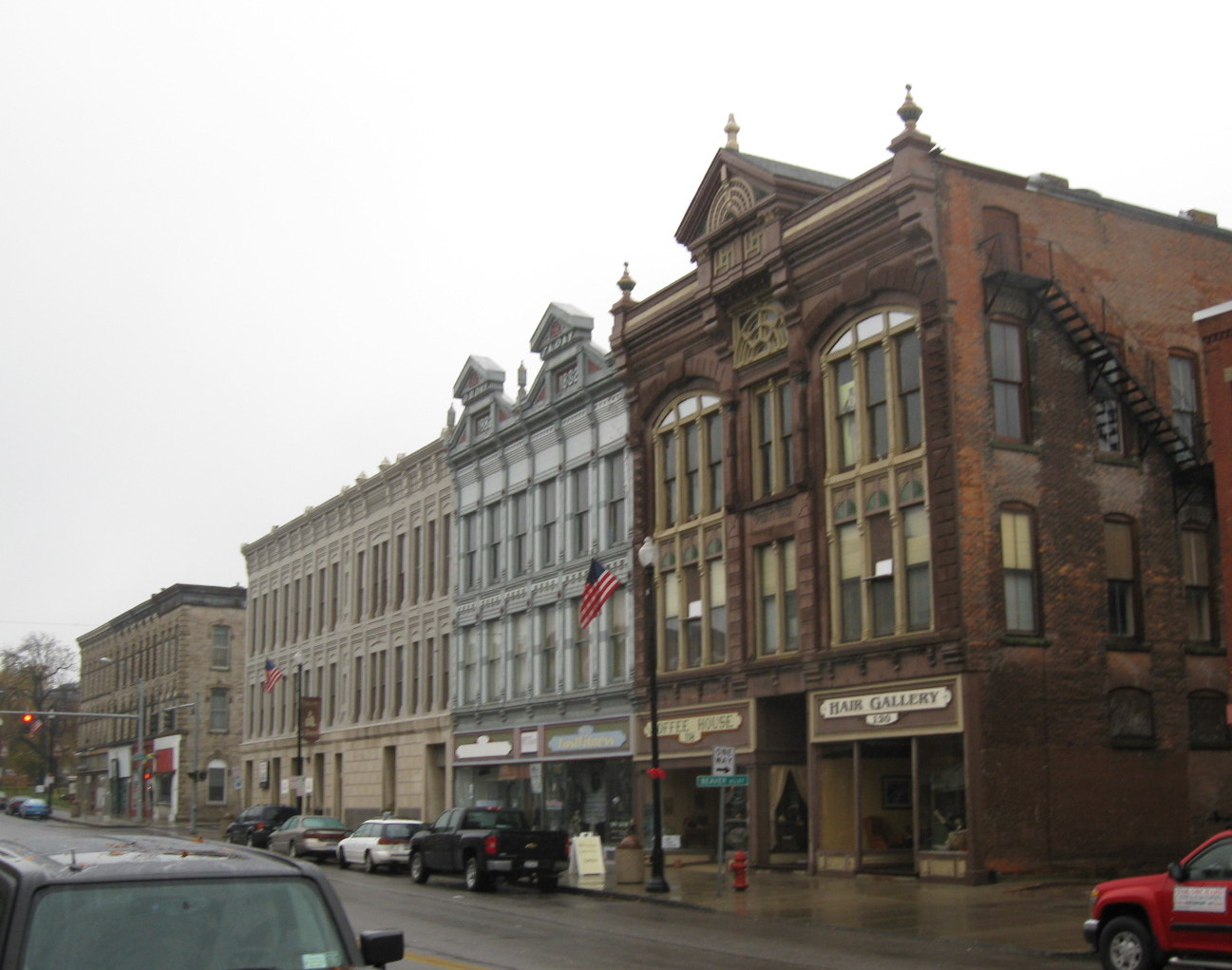
58-120 N. Main St., October 2009 [includes Granite Block at left and Pratt Opera House at right]
