= Orleans County Courthouse Historic District =

Historic district in New York, United States

- Orleans County Courthouse; Historic District
- U.S. National Register of Historic Places
- U.S. Historic district
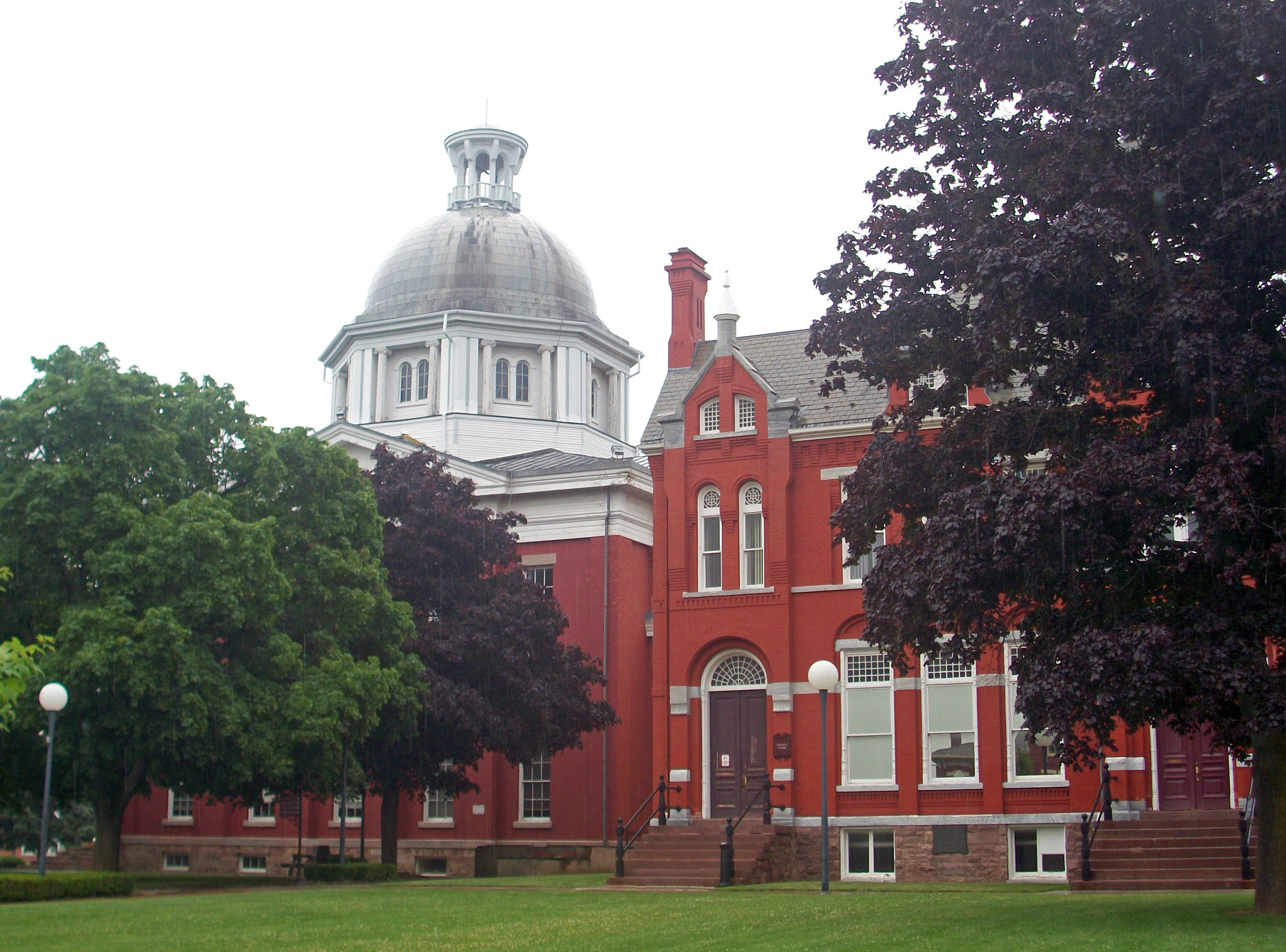
- Courthouse and Surrogate's Court building, 2010

- Location within New York Location within the United States
- Interactive map showing the location for Orleans County Courthouse Historical District
- Location: Albion, NY
- Nearest city: Batavia
- Coordinates: 43°14′45″N 78°11′36″W
- Area: 15 acres (6.1 ha)
- Built: 1830–1910
- Architect: William V.N. Barlow, Solon Beman, Andrew Jackson Warner, others
- Architectural style: various 19th-century styles
- NRHP reference No.: 79001617
- Added to NRHP: August 31, 1979

The Orleans County Courthouse Historic District is one of two located in downtown Albion, New York, United States. Centered on Courthouse Square, it includes many significant buildings in the village, such as its post office and churches from seven different denominations, one of which is the tallest structure in the county. Many buildings are the work of local architect William V.N. Barlow, with contributions from Solon Spencer Beman and Andrew Jackson Warner. They run the range of architectural styles from the era in which the district developed, from Federal to Colonial Revival.

Most of its buildings date to the 19th century, with some erected in the early 20th, a period when Albion was prospering not only as the county seat but as a stop on the Erie Canal, which passes through the village a short distance north of the district. A number of the buildings, including the county courthouse, use locally quarried Medina sandstone. In 1979 it was recognized as a historic district and listed on the National Register of Historic Places.

== Geography ==
The district is square-shaped with two protrusions on its northeast and southwest corners. Its boundaries follow lot lines. The entire Courthouse Square is included, and all the properties facing it on South Main (state highway NY 98), East State, South Platt and East Park Streets. On the southwest it continues along West Park to include all corners of the Liberty Street intersection, and likewise it continues along East State Street east of Platt to include all properties as far as Ingersoll Street.

This roughly 15-acre (6.1 ha) area includes 35 buildings, all but two of which are considered contributing properties to the district's overall historic character, built between 1830 and 1910 in various contemporary architectural styles. It is a densely developed urban core, on land sloping gently to the north. Albion's other downtown historic district, the more commercially oriented North Main-Bank Street area, borders on the north and extends to the canal, now part of the New York State Barge Canal system.

Many of the buildings along South Main, the principal vehicular route through the district, are massed, bulky structures of stone or brick. The district's original focal point, the metallic dome of the Greek Revival county courthouse, is set off by a similarly large county clerk's building of later construction to its south and the modern, non-contributing county jail to the southeast. Around the courthouse buildings is the only open space in the district, planted in mature tall trees on the west (front) of the courthouse and taken up with a parking lot to the south.

The neighboring streets complement the courthouse complex with large institutional buildings like the village's Swan Library and the seven churches. The 175-foot (53 m) spire of the Old English Gothic First Presbyterian Church to the north is a focal point for the region — as the tallest structure in Orleans County, it can be seen from 10 miles (16 km) away on clear days. On the far corners, the larger buildings give way to smaller buildings and houses.

== History ==
The district's active development can be split into two phases: the years from the creation of Orleans County to the construction of the new courthouse, when development was mostly residential and slower-paced; and the years after the current courthouse was built, when larger scale buildings were constructed at a faster rate. During the 20th century some renovations were made, and only two new buildings were added.

=== 1824–1858: Before the courthouse ===
When Orleans County was split from Genesee County to the south in 1824, a group of state commissioners visited the new county to choose the seat. At the time the choice was between Albion and Gaines to the northwest, then the two largest settlements in the county and relatively centrally located within it. The commissioners were impressed when Nehemiah Ingersoll, one of Albion's more prominent citizens, took them on a tour which showed its access to water power.

The next year the Erie Canal was opened, putting Albion on a major trade route across the state, giving local farmers access to distant markets. On the remains of a former glacial drumlin, a log cabin had been built in 1811 by William McAllister, one of the first buildings in what would become Albion. The area around it began to develop. Two churches were built across the square, the First Presbyterian Church on South Main in 1830 (currently Christ Episcopal Church) and the First United Methodist Church at East State and Platt. The Mahaney and Bullock houses, on South Main and Liberty respectively, were built around this time. The former, a three-bay Federal style structure with elliptical arched entrance and saddleback roof, is typical of the application of the style around Western New York at that time. The latter, later home to Reconstruction-era Georgia Governor Rufus Brown Bullock, is possibly the oldest building in the district. Its recessed panels beneath the first floor's arches recall Charles Bulfinch's influential Second Harrison Gray Otis House in Boston.

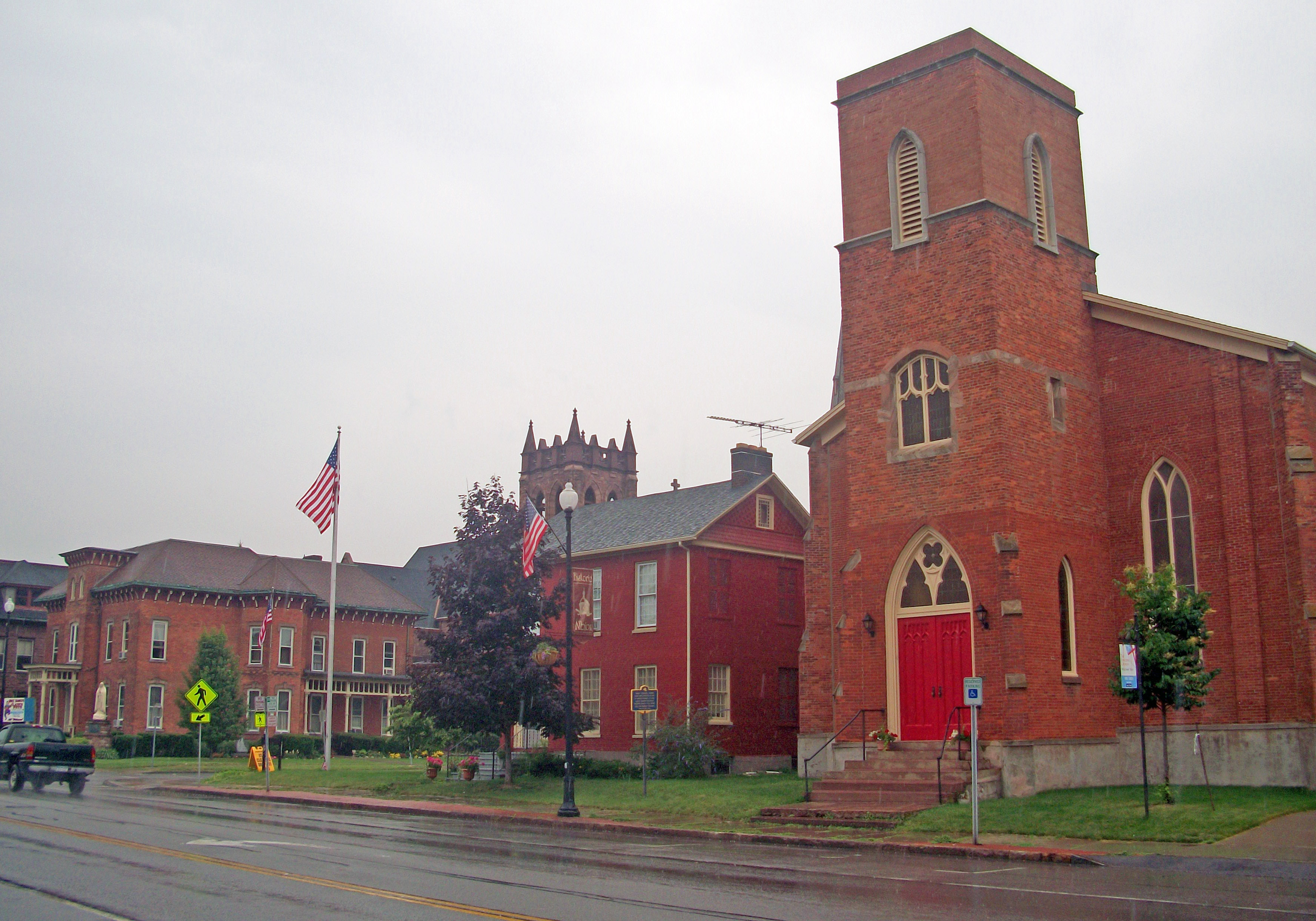
St. Joseph's Rectory (left), the Cooperative Extension building, and Christ Episcopal Church

In 1840 a large brick residence at the corner of Main and State streets was built in the Greek Revival style for Alexis Ward, the first president of the Village of Albion. The First Presbyterian Church's second building, now its chapel, demonstrates how it was applied locally. Other than the cast iron leaves of the front columns' Corinthian capitals, its brick exterior is devoid of ornament. Similarly the interior is decorated only with a plaster ceiling medallion. This austerity may reflect both the conservative tastes of the congregation at that time and their possibly limited construction budget.

The house of Sanford E. Church, later lieutenant governor and chief judge of the Court of Appeals, New York's highest court, also added Greek Revival elements to a Federal design. Located at East State and Ingersoll, it is the most prominent residence in the district. Its Doric colonnade acknowledges changing trends, but their slenderness along with the house's elliptical fanlight and clapboard siding suggests that its builder was not yet ready to fully embrace them.

A few years earlier, quarries near the village of Medina to the west had found a reddish-brown local variety of sandstone. Soon quarries near Albion began producing it as well, and it became a major local industry, producing much of what was called brownstone when used in New York City, as well as all the steps of Henry Hobson Richardson's "Million Dollar Staircase" in the state capitol.

It would take a while to be used for Albion's downtown other than curbs, steps or window trim. In the meantime, the Italianate style quietly debuted in Albion with the Porter House at 33 Platt Street in 1855. Five years earlier the Preston House at 118 East State Street had been built in a consciously Colonial style.

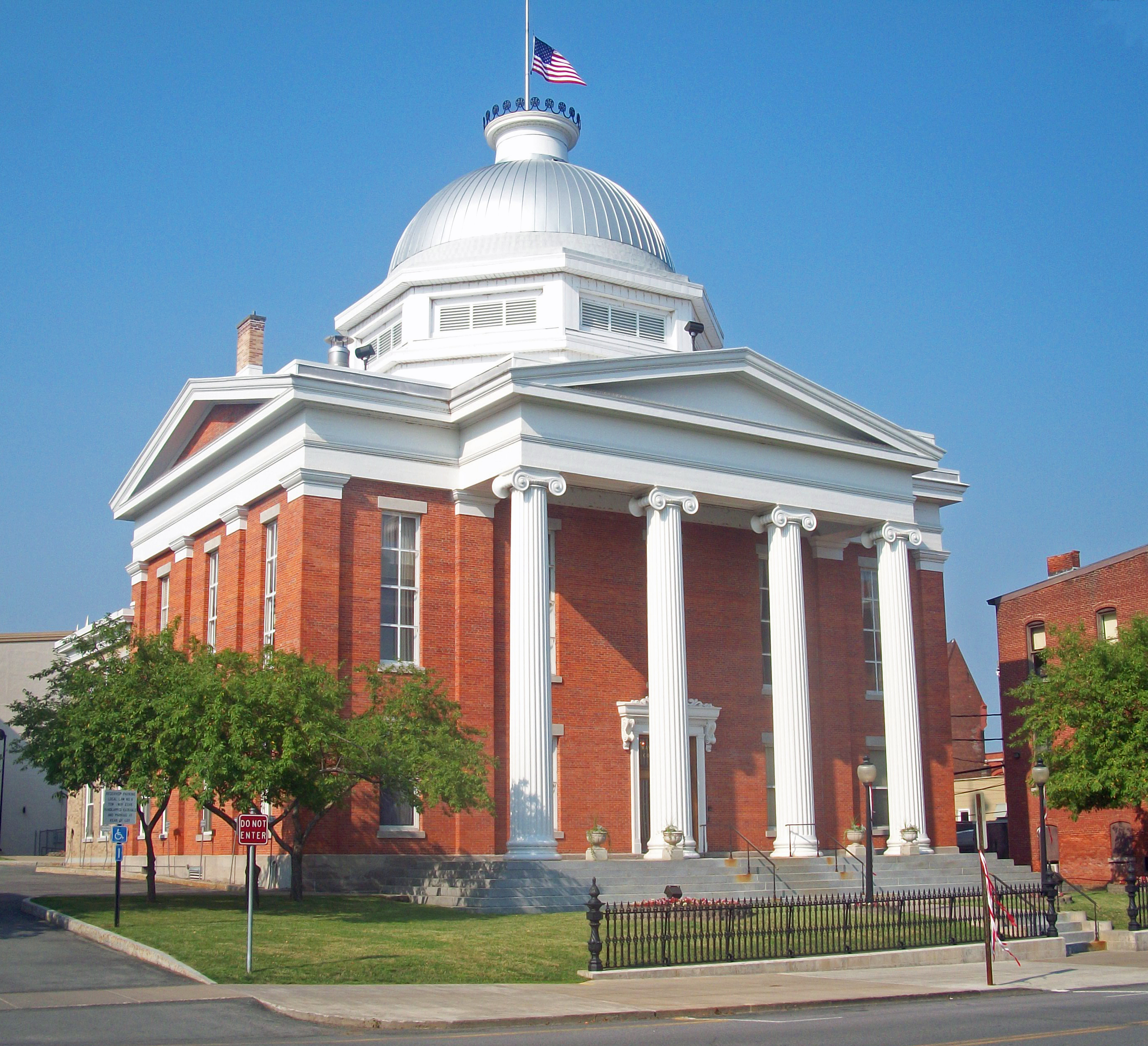
The Wayne County courthouse used as a model

=== 1858–89: The courthouse and after ===
In the late 1850s the county was beginning to outgrow its original courthouse. A committee of the county's board of supervisors that traveled to Lyons, the Wayne County seat, was impressed enough with the courthouse there that the board decided it should be the model for their new one. For the design, they chose William V.N. Barlow, a young local architect for whom the courthouse would be his signature building but also the first of many contributions to the district as either designer or builder.

His courthouse building, completed in 1858, was an ornate Greek Revival structure with a tall, gilded dome 36 feet (11 m) wide like its model. Its embrace of the style contrasted with the more restrained use of it on older buildings nearby like the Presbyterian chapel and Church House. The front columns were 50 feet (15 m) tall, and the dome top twice that height. The cupola was once open to visitors, allowing for views to Lake Ontario to the north in clear weather.

Two years later, the First Baptist Church on West Park Street matched the scale of the new courthouse with a structure combining Gothic (steep buttresses and a tall hexagonal tower rising from the center of the front facade) and Romanesque elements (round arched windows and corbel tables). Also built that year was the first house of worship in the Free Methodist Church, started by abolitionists, on East State Street. It too combined the styles, with Romanesque proportions and Carpenter Gothic design touches. The building's vertical battens are topped with unmolded block capitals, suggesting the building's unknown architect was considerably refined in the use of the style.

After the Civil War the village prospered. Since 1853, when the New York Central Railroad had absorbed the Rochester, Lockport and Niagara Falls Railroad, which ran through the village paralleling the canal to the south, its agricultural products and sandstone had been shipped to many distant markets. Growth in the district continued apace. The Methodists built an Italianate parsonage on Platt Street in 1865, and during the 1870s Barlow and others built new houses, introducing styles like the Second Empire and its mansard roof on the 1879 White-Martilotta House at 134 East State Street, the largest home built in the district since Church's. Barlow also built the Italian villa-style brick home for local merchant William Gere on the southwest corner of West Park and South Main, which now serves as the rectory for St. Joseph's Church.

When local banker and politician Elizur Hart died in 1870, he left $50,000 (approximately $950,000 in contemporary dollars) for the construction of a new First Presbyterian Church. He specifically stipulated that the new church's spire be taller than the one on the Baptist church.

Andrew Jackson Warner was commissioned to design the new church. He delivered the current building, made entirely of rusticated stone, which he had become familiar with while working on Henry Hobson Richardson's Buffalo State Hospital earlier in his career. The English Gothic style chosen was also well-adapted to the material, since the 13th-century churches used as models were usually made of local stone. Some aspects of the design, such as the placement of the tower, the rose window and the placement of the details, suggest the influence of Richard Upjohn, whose 1859 Third Presbyterian Church in Rochester Warner would also have been familiar with. The spire, when finished the following year, reached 175 feet (53 m), making it the tallest structure not only in the village but the county. A manse squarely in the Colonial Revival style was also built that year.

In 1885, Barlow introduced two new styles to Albion. The Warner House at 21 East Park is the village's first Queen Anne, and just down the street at 34 East Park he brought the Eastlake style, where the decoration is made of the same material as the surface it is on, to Albion. Three years later, it got a higher-profile placement with the Surrogate's Building just south of the courthouse. Rochester architect Harvey Ellis dotted the faces of the building, made entirely of fireproof materials, with inventive brickwork. "From that point on", wrote a critic decades later, "his genius as a practitioner of the true fine art of building begins to sing".

Yet another emerging style, Colonial Revival was brought to the district at the end of the decade by Barlow. In 1889 he oversaw the renovation of the 50-year-old residence at Main and State into the Swan Library. Most of the exterior was redecorated for the new style. Inside, its original Greek Revival woodwork remains intact except for a large reading room redone in Colonial Revival.

=== 1890s: Two churches ===
The 1890s saw two of the district's churches, among them one of its most distinctive, built through the generosity of local benefactors. All used Medina sandstone, reflecting the prosperity of the region at the time.

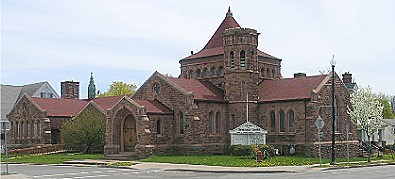
Pullman Memorial Universalist Church

The next year George Pullman, the railroad-car entrepreneur who had lived in Albion as a young cabinetmaker during the late 1840s and into the 1850s, agreed to build a Universalist church in the village (named Pullman Memorial Universalist Church). He commissioned Solon Spencer Beman, who had designed his company town outside Chicago. Beman saw that the Medina sandstone was particularly well-suited to the Richardsonian Romanesque style, and produced a compact church of rough-hewn blocks of that material, with unmolded window trim revealing the thickness of the face. While it uses pointed arches instead of the round ones Richardson preferred, the tower evokes the older architect's Trinity Church in Boston. The interior echoes Richardson as well in contrasting the exterior's heaviness and seriousness with space and bright color, including the Tiffany stained glass window and golden oak ceiling beams.

The last of the two churches of the 1890s was a spite building. William Stafford, a member of the Baptist Church and Orleans County District Attorney, ran for reelection and lost. He felt his loss was partly due to his fellow congregants failure to sufficiently support him. He sold the land he owned next to the Baptist Church to St. Joseph's Roman Catholic Church, which was outgrowing its current location on Main Street north of the Erie Canal. According to local legend, the property was sold under the condition that a new church on the property be built close enough to West Park Street to block the view of the Baptist church from Main Street. The Gothic Revival building, designed by an unknown architect, is smaller in scale and less decorated than the other churches, but does block the view to the Baptist Church from Main Street.

=== 1900–present: Decline and preservation ===
A few more buildings were added to the district in the early 20th century, and some others were renovated. A tower with the board-and-batten siding was added to the Free Methodist Church in 1900, and St. Joseph's built a school in 1913. Later that year the Pullman church built a parsonage of its own. Its Colonial Revival design, featuring a delicate half-ellipse, evoked the very same Federal and Greek Revival buildings that had been built in the nearby blocks when the area was first developed.

The industries that made Albion prosperous started to decline after that decade. The canal was enlarged and made part of the New York State Barge Canal system in 1918, which failed to stop the loss of traffic to railroads that were growing ever more efficient. By the 1920s Portland cement had become common and cheap enough that the sandstone quarries were losing customers. The courthouse was renovated in the late 1920s. Late in the Depression, in 1937, a new post office in the Colonial Revival style was built opposite the courthouse and library, with two Greek Revival homes that had been there demolished in the process.

Swan Library itself was redecorated in 1952, only to have the original color scheme restored in 1975. Shortly before that the modernist new county jail had been built, the most recent construction in the district. An interest in preserving the village's downtown culminated in the 1979 listing on the Register. The village created a Historic Preservation Commission to oversee its historic districts. It is charged with protecting and enhancing the landmarks within them and making the village more attractive to visitors in order to ensure growth and development.

== Significant contributing properties ==
None of the district's 33 contributing properties is currently independently listed on the National Register. The post office, within the district, was listed after the district, but is not considered to be contributing to the district because it was built after 1910, the end of the district's period of significance.

- Rufus Brown Bullock House, 36 Liberty Street. The future governor of Georgia lived in an 1830 house typical of Federal style homes in the region.
- Sanford E. Church House, 4 Ingersoll Street. A large Federal style home built around 1840 with some Greek Revival decoration, it was the largest early home in the district.
- First Presbyterian Church, 29 East State Street. Andrew Jackson Warner's 1875 building with its tall spire is the largest church in the district.
- Free Methodist Church, East State Street. The Mother Church of the Free Methodists is an 1850s Carpenter Gothic-style building.
- Orleans County Courthouse, Courthouse Square. William Barlow's 1858 Greek Revival centerpiece to the district is considered his most important building.
- Pullman Memorial Universalist Church, South Main and East Park streets. Solon Spencer Beman's 1894 stone church, endowed by his patron George M. Pullman, has been described as the finest in the village Pullman once called home.
- Surrogate's Building, Courthouse Square. Harvey Ellis's 1888 structure brought the Eastlake style to center stage in Albion.
- Swan Building (Roswell Smith Burrows Mansion), 4 North Main Street. Barlow oversaw this 1840 house's conversion into Albion's first public library.
- White-Marilotta House, 134 East State Street. Barlow's 1879 commission for Judge John Hull White marked the Second Empire's debut in the village.

== See also ==
- National Register of Historic Places listings in Orleans County, New York
