= Cobblestone Historic District =

Historic district in New York, United States

- U.S. National Register of Historic Places
- U.S. National Historic Landmark District
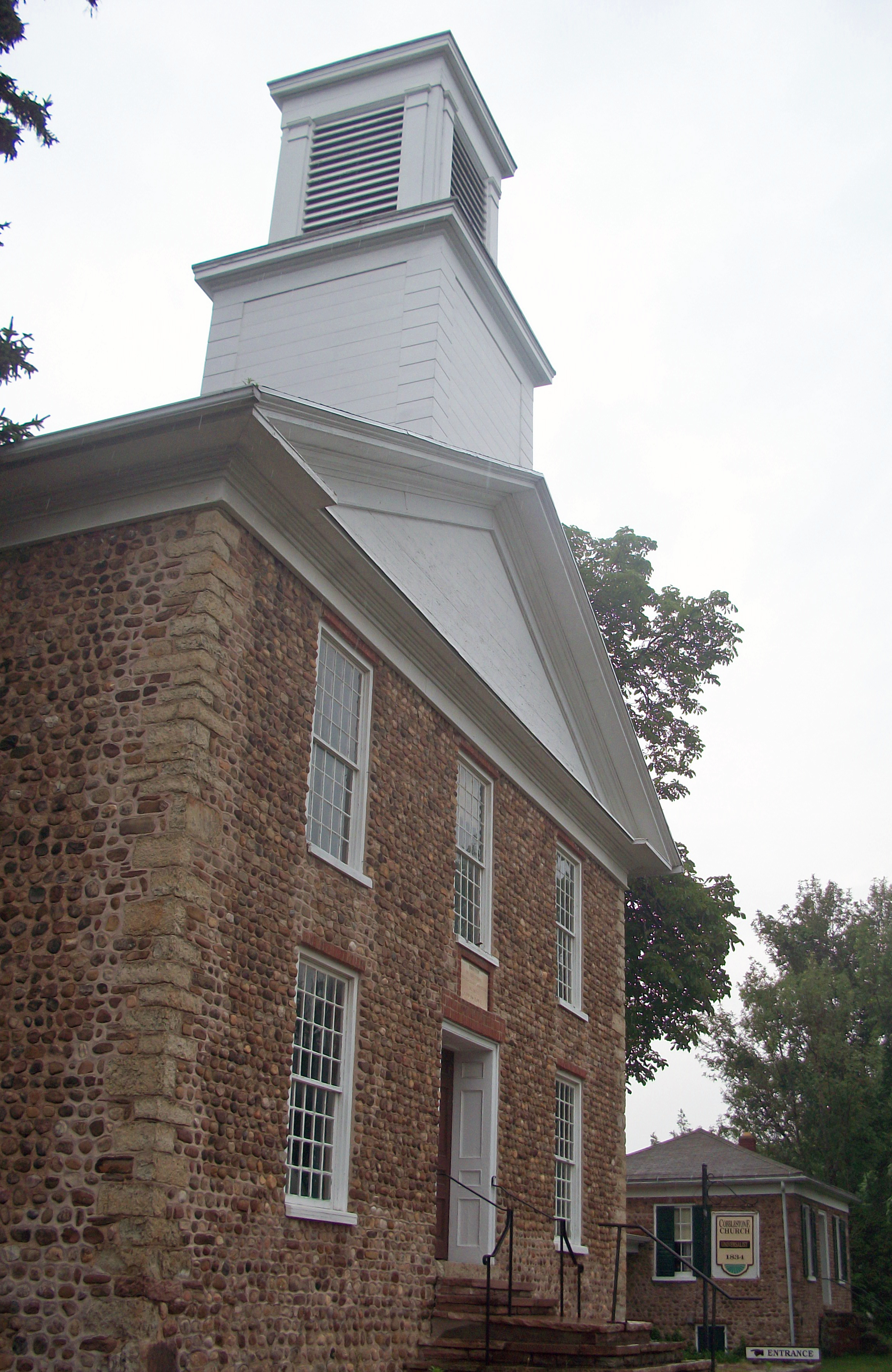
- Partial west profile and south elevation of 1834 Universalist Church, 2010. The Ward House is in the background.

- Location within New York Location within the United States
- Location: Childs, NY
- Nearest city: Batavia
- Coordinates: 43°17′13″N 78°11′27″W
- Area: 0.9 acres (3,600 m^{2})
- Built: 1834-1839
- Architectural style: Cobblestone Federal style and Greek Revival
- NRHP reference No.: 93001603

Significant dates
- Added to NRHP: April 19, 1993
- Designated NHLD: April 19, 1993

The Cobblestone Historic District is located along state highway NY 104 (Ridge Road) in Childs, New York, United States. It comprises three buildings that exemplify the cobblestone architecture developed to a high degree in the regions of upstate New York near Lake Ontario and exported to other areas with settlers. It is the location of the Albion-based Cobblestone Society's Cobblestone Museum.

The buildings are in the Federal and Greek Revival styles typical of their era. Later renovations gave them some touches of styles from later in the 19th century, such as Italianate and Gothic Revival; however they remain largely intact in their original designs. They are currently owned by the Cobblestone Society, which has restored and preserved them since the 1960s.

Currently the largest building, a former Universalist church that is the oldest cobblestone church in North America, is used as a museum. Another building, a school, is one of only two that use the cobblestones as an outer veneer. The district was added to the National Register of Historic Places as a National Historic Landmark in 1993. At less than an acre in total area it is the smallest National Historic Landmark District in the state.

== Geography ==
The district consists of three buildings — a church, its parsonage and a former school building — in two separate parcels totaling 0.9 acres (3,600 m^{2}). Both are located along the north side of the highway just east of its junction with NY 98, three miles (4.8 km) north of Albion, the Orleans County seat, in the Town of Gaines. The terrain is generally level along Route 104, the top of the long rise of the Niagara Escarpment the former Ridge Road followed, with the land gently rising to it from both north and south. The surrounding area of the hamlet of Childs has light development, mostly residential, along the two highways near the intersection. Some of the other buildings are also of cobblestone but are not included in the district. Beyond the hamlet the area is rural, with cultivated fields and woodlots.

Immediately adjacent to a modern gas station at the northeast is the first of the two parcels, containing the church and Ward House, its onetime parsonage. The school is located approximately a half-mile (1 km) down the road to the east, on the other parcel. Between the two are other buildings, mostly houses, some of cobblestone themselves. All three buildings are contributing properties to the district.

== History ==
The smooth round cobblestones from the lake began to be used as a building material around 1825, in Wayne and Monroe counties to the east. The English masons who worked on the Erie Canal are believed to have pioneered the technique, borrowing from Roman building traditions still followed in Britain. Local farmers of means in the counties along the Lake Ontario shore had houses built of cobblestone in the Federal and Greek Revival architectural styles.

John Proctor, a successful real estate speculator who had made money in Massachusetts and Vermont as well as elsewhere in New York, bought the Childs area in the 1820s and planned the village, subdividing it into lots. He was determined that a church should be the focal point of the village, so he bought back the current lot and had the church built there in 1834. He owned the land on which the neighboring parsonage and the District 5 School were both built, later selling them to the church and school district respectively.

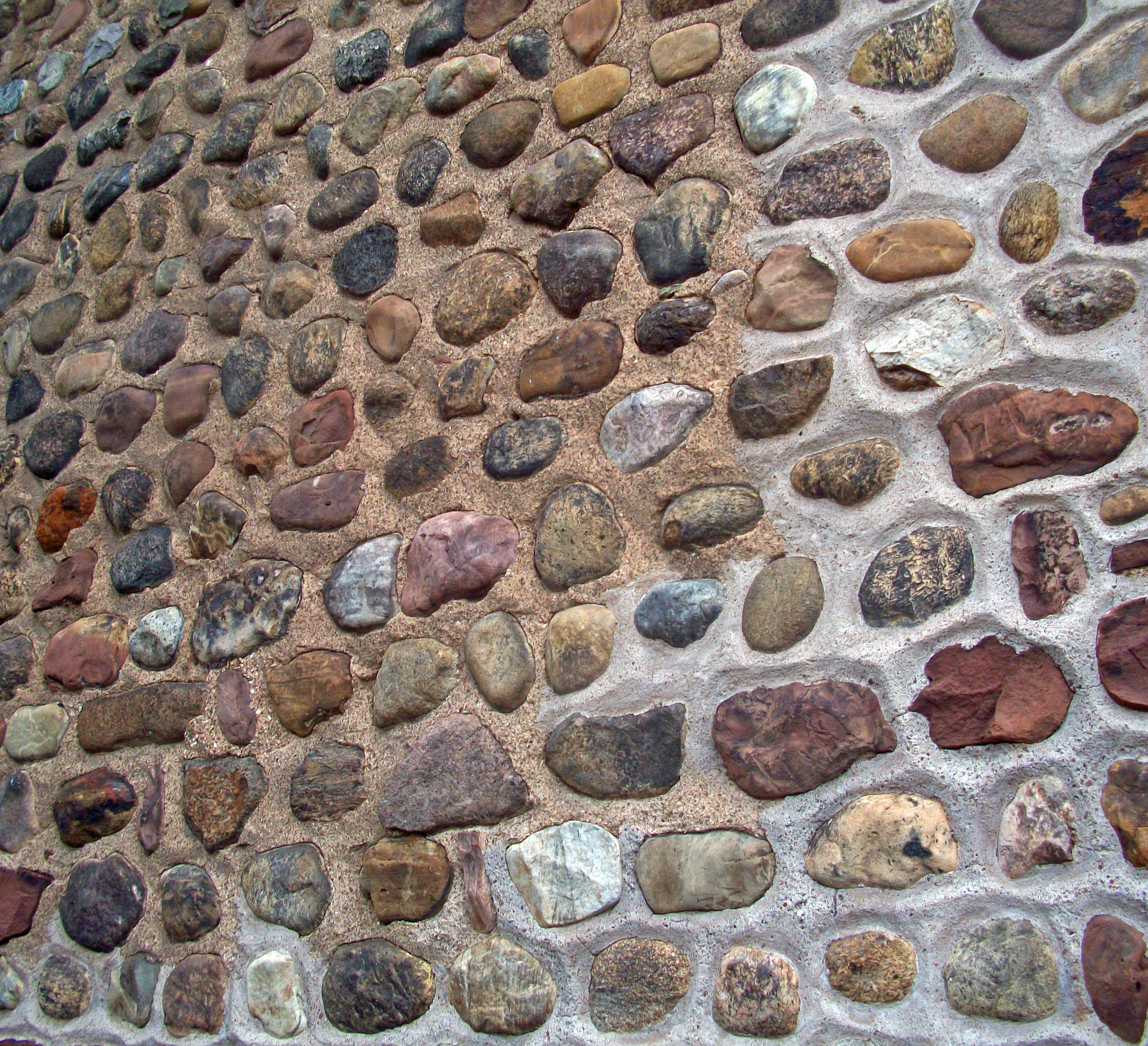
Cobblestone detail on church west wall

The three buildings show the evolution of cobblestone technique. The church, the oldest, uses regular field cobbles with minimal mortar decoration. The Ward House has the stones arranged in a pattern, the depressed hexagon known as the Gaines Pattern after another small community to the west along Route 104. The school, built last, uses small lake-washed stones as a veneer. It is one of only two cobblestone buildings in the state which are known to have a cobblestone veneer over wood frame.

In 1874 the church was renovated. The terrace was added outside and the inside redecorated and reconfigured so that the pews were turned around to face the new location of the pulpit in the rear, most of their doors removed, and the center gallery removed. The pews themselves, originally painted white, were grained at this time. The parsonage's original front door was replaced as well. Later the rear wing was built.

Some Americans who later became significant historical personages lived in or near the future district during the 19th century. George Pullman lived there as a teenager, learning cabinetry from his father. He worshipped at the church, which remained the main Universalist church in the area until he endowed a new one in the village of Albion near the county courthouse in 1894. Newspaper editor Horace Greeley's aunt and uncle, Benjamin and Mary Ann Woodburn Dwinnell, lived in the Ward House. For a while he even held the mortgage on it.

The church fell into disuse for much of the 20th century, but has hosted summer "country" services twice a year since 1971. Its tower was removed in 1919. After its northwest corner was patched with brick following some settling around 1910, the school was closed in 1952 as the local school districts modernized and consolidated.

In 1961 the Cobblestone Society, established the year before, bought it for $129, Two years later it acquired the church as well. In 1966 an architect working from photos of the original tower designed an exact copy as a replacement, and it was installed. The parsonage came into the society's possession in 1975, when Inez Martyn Ward, for whom it would be named, sold it to the society.

== Buildings ==
=== 1834 Universalist Church ===
The westernmost of the three buildings in the district, the church is a three-story Federal style building with a gabled roof, quoined at the corners and topped by a square wooden tower with corner pilasters, and wooden front pediment. The front cobblestones are more finely graded than those on the sides, with some tooling evident in the interstitial mortar. A stone terrace in front is floored in brick capped with sandstone coping. Brick also frames a marble tablet over the front door that reads: "Erected by the First Universalist Society A D 1834 GOD IS LOVE".

On the inside the lobby has stairs to the gallery, with delicate square newels topped by spherical finials, on each side. At the rear of the church is a 12-by-6-foot (3.7 by 1.8 m) platform with a walnut pulpit and three matching Gothic Revival pulpit chairs in front of a trompe-l'œil painting of an alcove. Italianate detailing is evident in the pillars and balustrade of the choir loft. The woodwork has been meticulously grained by the same local painter who did the rear wall painting.

=== Ward House ===
Believed to have been built around 1840 as a parsonage, it is a hipped-roofed Federal style one-story building with a raised basement giving the effect of a ground floor. The 18-by-24-foot (5.5 by 7.3 m) main block is sided in cobblestone applied more carefully than that on the church. On the east and west sides of the ground level the field cobbles are set in the Gaines Pattern, in which each is part of a small hexagonal box. Quoins of Medina sandstone mark the corners.

On the northwest the house has a small frame wing, sided in vertical tongue and groove, added later, with a porch on the west side. Its roof is supported with a Colonial Revival fluted column. The addition itself has a shed roof.

An Italianate door with two original stained glass windows leads into a first floor with Federal door and window casings on long, narrow Greek Revival doors. The walls are plastered directly onto the masonry. Furniture and decor reflect the 1880s.

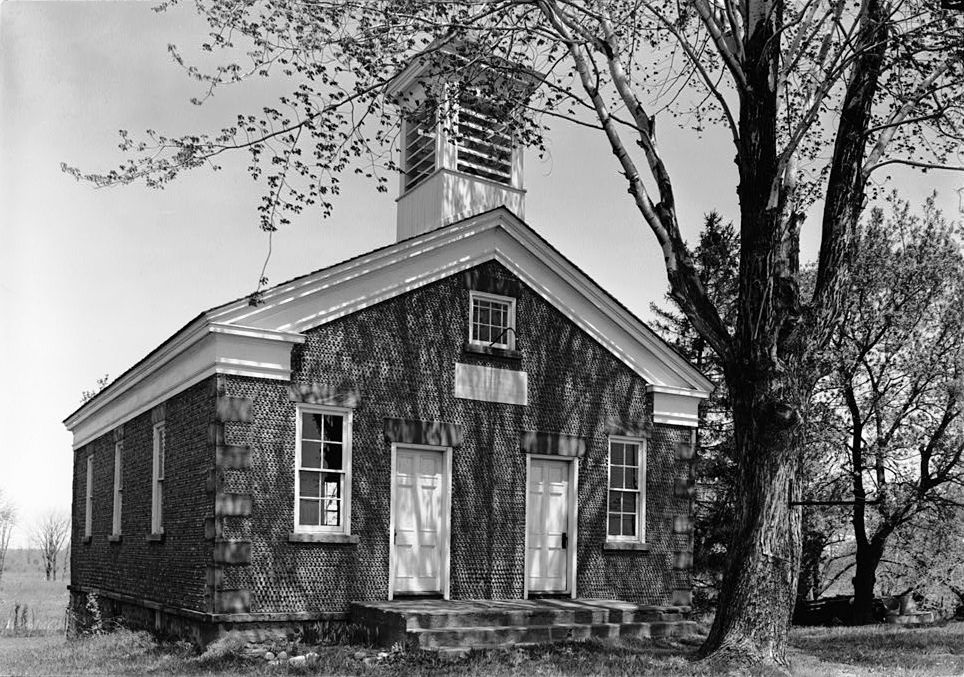
School ca. 1965

=== District 5 School ===
A half-mile (1 km) east of the other two buildings, the District 5 School is the youngest, built in 1849. It is a one-and-a-half-story Greek Revival gabled building topped by an open belfry with louvered vents and domed roof at the south (front) end. Its predominately lake-washed brown cobblestones are different from the other two buildings in that they are a decorative veneer on a wood-frame structure. Only one other cobblestone building in New York, another residence in Gaines, is known to use cobblestone this way. At the northwest corner some brick was used when repairs were necessary.

The cobblestones are arranged tightly, four rows per corner quoin on the front and sides and three in the rear. A sandstone water table runs around the building at floor level, above the fieldstone foundation. At the roofline is a wide wooden molded frieze with returns. The windows have plain stone trim. In the front center are two separate doors, for boys and girls, similarly treated, with small stone steps. Above them is a marble tablet reading "School District No 5 of Gaines A D 1849 Wm. J. Babbitt Esq. gratuitously superintended the erection of the building and made the district a present of the bell". It is topped with an unusual attic gable-field window.

Inside, the recessed-paneled wooden doors open into separate cloakrooms 10 feet (3.3 m) square. Both have horizontal tongue-and-groove wainscoting and plaster upper walls. The ceilings, like all in the school, are tongue-and-groove random-width plank. The boys' cloakroom has the cellar door, and a rope to ring the bell.

In the classroom, the maple flooring is inclined so students in the northern portion, the rear, were sitting higher than those in the front. Its walls have a similar treatment to the cloakrooms. Original blackboards are still in place, supplemented by slate boards added to the side walls later. Behind the teacher's desk is a cupboard and niche for a clock. The heating system of two trapdoors to the ceiling operated by a rope remains as well.

== Preservation ==
The town has no special zoning to protect the district. All three buildings are property of the Cobblestone Society, founded when 60 people met at the church in 1960 to discuss how to best preserve them. In addition to the three in the district, it also runs five other buildings in the vicinity, part of the museum complex, representing life in Childs at the time the cobblestone buildings were built. It also works to preserve cobblestone buildings elsewhere in the county.

The society also operates a gift shop in the basement of the church, and gives tours. It has also made the church available for weddings. Money earned from these endeavors has helped it restore the buildings and give demonstrations of cobblestone masonry techniques.

== See also ==
- List of National Historic Landmarks in New York
- National Register of Historic Places listings in Orleans County, New York
