= Gaines District No. 2 Cobblestone Schoolhouse =

- U.S. National Register of Historic Places

- Location within New York
- Location: 3286 Gaines Basin Rd. Gaines, New York
- Coordinates: 43°15′25.56″N 78°13′25.30″W
- Built: 1832
- Architectural style: Early cobblestone architecture
- Restored: 2014–2021
- MPS: Cobblestone Architecture of New York State MPS
- NRHP reference No.: 100001070
- Added to NRHP: June 12, 2017

The Gaines District No. 2 Cobblestone Schoolhouse is a historic schoolhouse located in the Town of Gaines in Orleans County, New York, near Albion. It has been listed on the National Register of Historic Places since June 12, 2017.

The first settlers arrived in what is now Gaines Basin well before the Erie Canal (or any namesake turning basin thereon) did. Brothers Lansing and Joel Bailey built a wooden cabin there in 1812. By 1823, as the Erie Canal was nearing completion, the family had moved on, and the building was being used as a school house.

Population growth brought on by the Canal and expanding settlement of Orleans County (which split from Genesee County in 1824) necessitated a larger structure for educating local children. The new school was built in 1832 of local cobblestone, as was common in the area, on land across the road from the old school building. The new building had 913 square feet of space and continued serving as a school until 1944, when centralization caused Gaines District No. 2 to be consolidated into the Albion Central School District.

The building sat unused for decades until efforts to preserve the deteriorating building began in 2014. In 2015, a historical marker was added, and by 2017 restoration efforts had progressed enough to have the property listed on the National Register of Historic Places. That same year, a donated outhouse was moved to the property. By 2021, the interior had been restored to its 1940s appearance, with the original teacher's desk and authentic decor.

The Orleans County Historical Association (which spearheaded the restoration work) received the property as a donation and intends to use the building for history programs and gatherings.
