= Millville Cemetery =

Historic cemetery in New York, United States

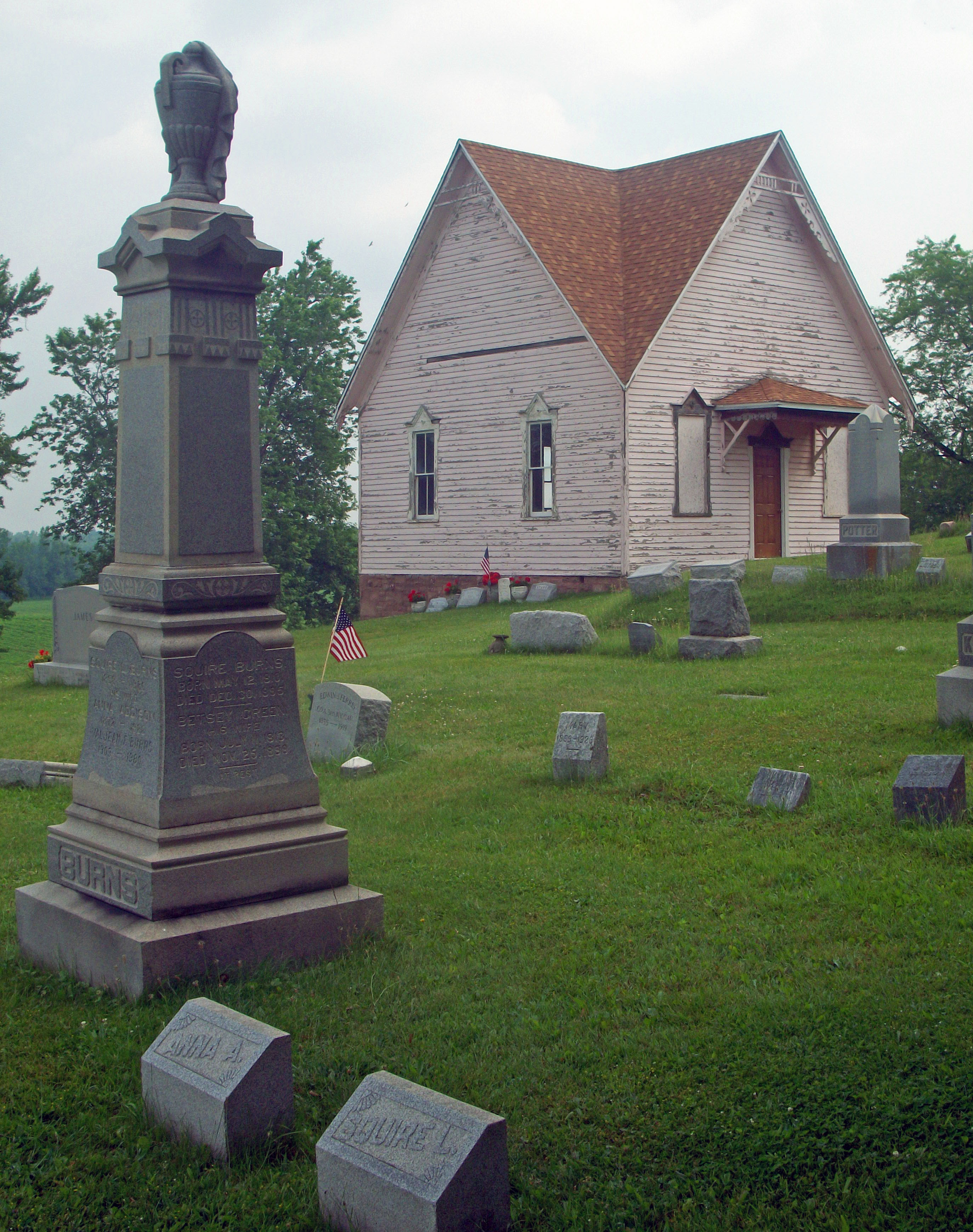
- Graves and chapel, 2010
- Interactive map of Millville Cemetery

Details
- Established: 1871
- Location: Millville, New York
- Country: United States
- Coordinates: 43°11′23″N 78°19′28″W
- Type: Private
- Owned by: Millville Cemetery Association
- Size: 7.5 acres (3.0 ha)
- No. of graves: 197
- Find a Grave: Millville Cemetery

Millville Cemetery is located on East Shelby Road (Orleans County Route 18) in Millville, New York, United States. It was established in 1871 as a rural cemetery, expanding on an early burial ground.

The cemetery is built on a small hill in an otherwise flat area. The landscape was manipulated to create a system of perimeter roads and plantings, characteristics that show an advanced understanding of the rural cemetery aesthetic by its unknown designer(s). Its focal point, near the top of the hill, is a small wooden chapel with a memorial vault in the basement.

Its monuments and funerary art, in a variety of styles, reflect the prosperity of Millville in the late 19th century. In 2007 it was listed on the National Register of Historic Places, the second cemetery in the county with that distinction after Mount Albion Cemetery outside Albion.

== Grounds ==
The cemetery is a 7.5-acre (3.0 ha) parcel on the east side of West Shelby Road in the Town of Shelby, approximately one mile (1.6 km) south of Maple Ridge Road (NY 31A) at the hamlet of Millville, and a thousand feet (300 m) north of East Shelby's intersection with Martin and Wheeler roads. Medina, several miles to the northwest, is the nearest large settlement. The area is rural, with open worked fields and houses clustered near the road. The cemetery is built on a small hill that rises 30 feet (9.1 m) above the surrounding level terrain.

On the road side, the cemetery is delineated by a retaining wall of locally quarried red Medina sandstone in an ashlar pattern. At the center an ornate iron arch on brick piers with "Millville Cemetery" spelled out on top allows access to the narrow gravel road going up the hill. It is one of four that cross the cemetery east-west to a parallel gravel road in the rear. The plantings, primarily large evergreen trees, proceed in regular rows across the property.

Near the hilltop, to the northwest of the center of the cemetery, is the chapel. It is a 26-foot-square (7.9 m) wood frame Gothic Revival building that serves as a chapel, office and receiving vault. It is a one-and-a-half-story structure on a Medina sandstone foundation, built into the hill and also used as a vault. Sided in clapboard, it is topped with a cross-gabled roof shingled in asphalt. Each side has, along the ground floor, a single double-hung sash window and jigsaw-cut tracery vergeboards. A door on the south side with simple bracketed hood is the main entrance. It opens into a single large room with varnished beaded walls and simple wood trim.

The oldest of the 197 graves, dating to the 1820s, are found in the original burying ground at the northwest corner. All others date from the cemetery's establishment to the present, with most predating 1950. They range from simple marble slabs to obelisks, sarcophagi and some custom designs. The most unusual is a tall hexagonal obelisk with Gothic Revival detailing in white marble. All decedents are local.

== History ==
Millville grew starting in the 1810s through its access to the water power of Fish Creek and two other streams nearby. In its early years, its name was evident from the three sawmills, gristmill and turning mill in the settlement. Later, the clearing of land for farms reduced the flow of the streams and it could not support as many mills.

By 1870, it had a school, post office, churches, shops and stores amid about 30 houses. Residents incorporated the Millville Cemetery Association to expand the old burying ground south of the hamlet into a cemetery. It was opened in 1871, and by 1873 the receiving vault had been built into the hillside.

Records from that time period do not say who designed the cemetery. It seems from what was built that the designer or cemetery trustees had a well-formed understanding of the rural cemetery concept to apply it effectively. Its use of one of the few significant rises in an otherwise flat area, the landscaping and roads and the plantings make it an exemplary vernacular rural cemetery.

The only significant change to the original design was the addition of the chapel building. The association's trustees decided to build it over the vault in 1893. They selected a design by Joseph Campbell the following year, and it was finished by December 1894 at a total cost of $459 ($17,000 in contemporary dollars). There have been no changes since then save the addition of more graves.

== See also ==
- List of cemeteries in New York
- National Register of Historic Places listings in Orleans County, New York
