= Bacon–Harding Farm =

- U.S. National Register of Historic Places
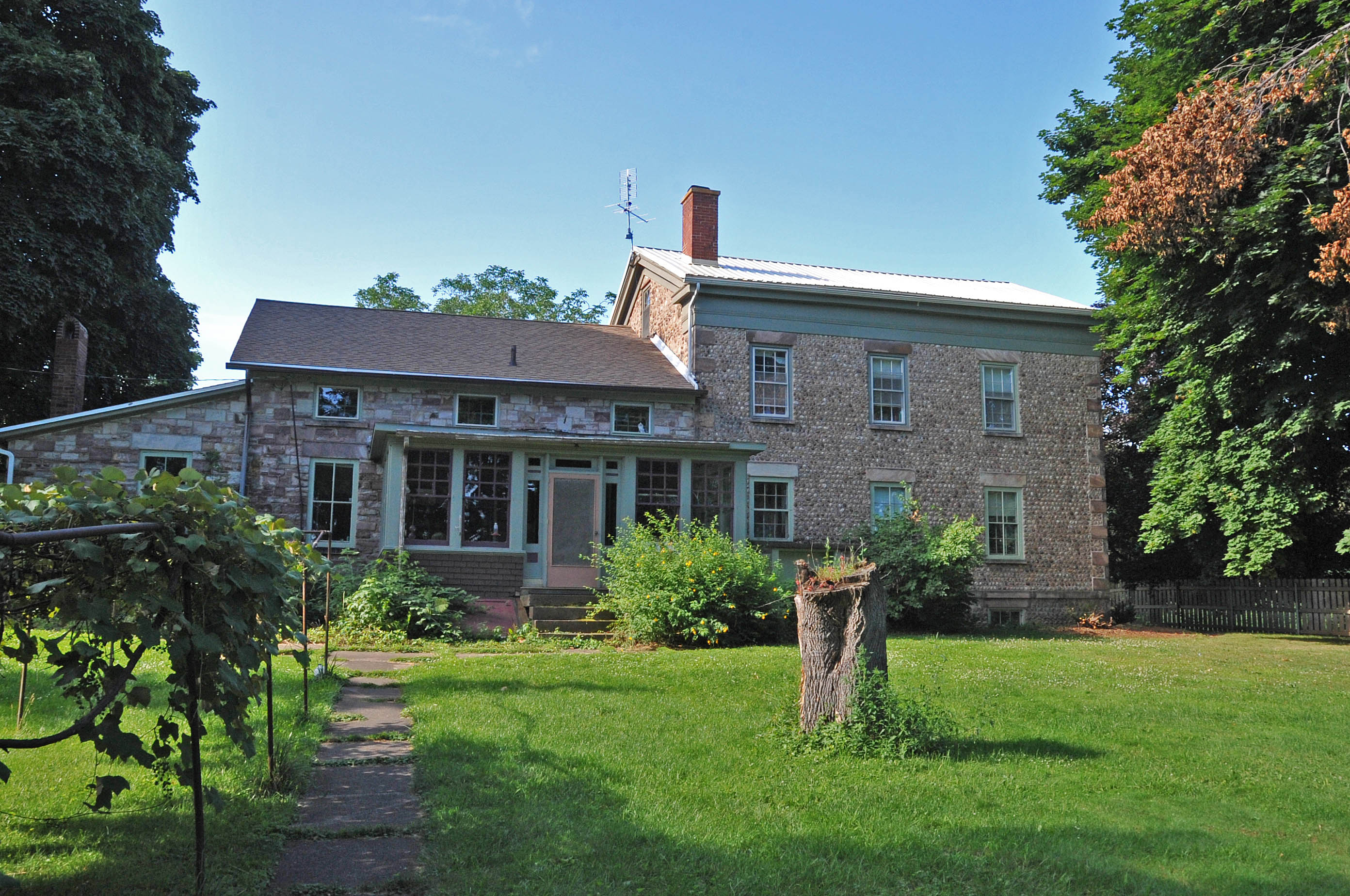
- Bacon–Harding Farm, January 2008

- Location within New York Location within the United States
- Location: 3077 Oak Orchard Road, Gaines, New York
- Coordinates: 43.26714°N 78.19245°W
- Built: 1844
- Architectural style: Greek Revival
- MPS: Cobblestone Architecture of New York State MPS
- NRHP reference No.: 13000041
- Added to NRHP: February 27, 2013

Bacon–Harding Farm is a historic home and farm located at Gaines in Orleans County, New York. It is a 200-year-old farm still owned by the same family. The farm is centered on a Greek Revival style cobblestone farmhouse built in 1844.

It was listed on the National Register of Historic Places in 2013.
