= St. Luke's Episcopal Church (Brockport, New York) =

Historic church in New York, United States

- U.S. National Register of Historic Places
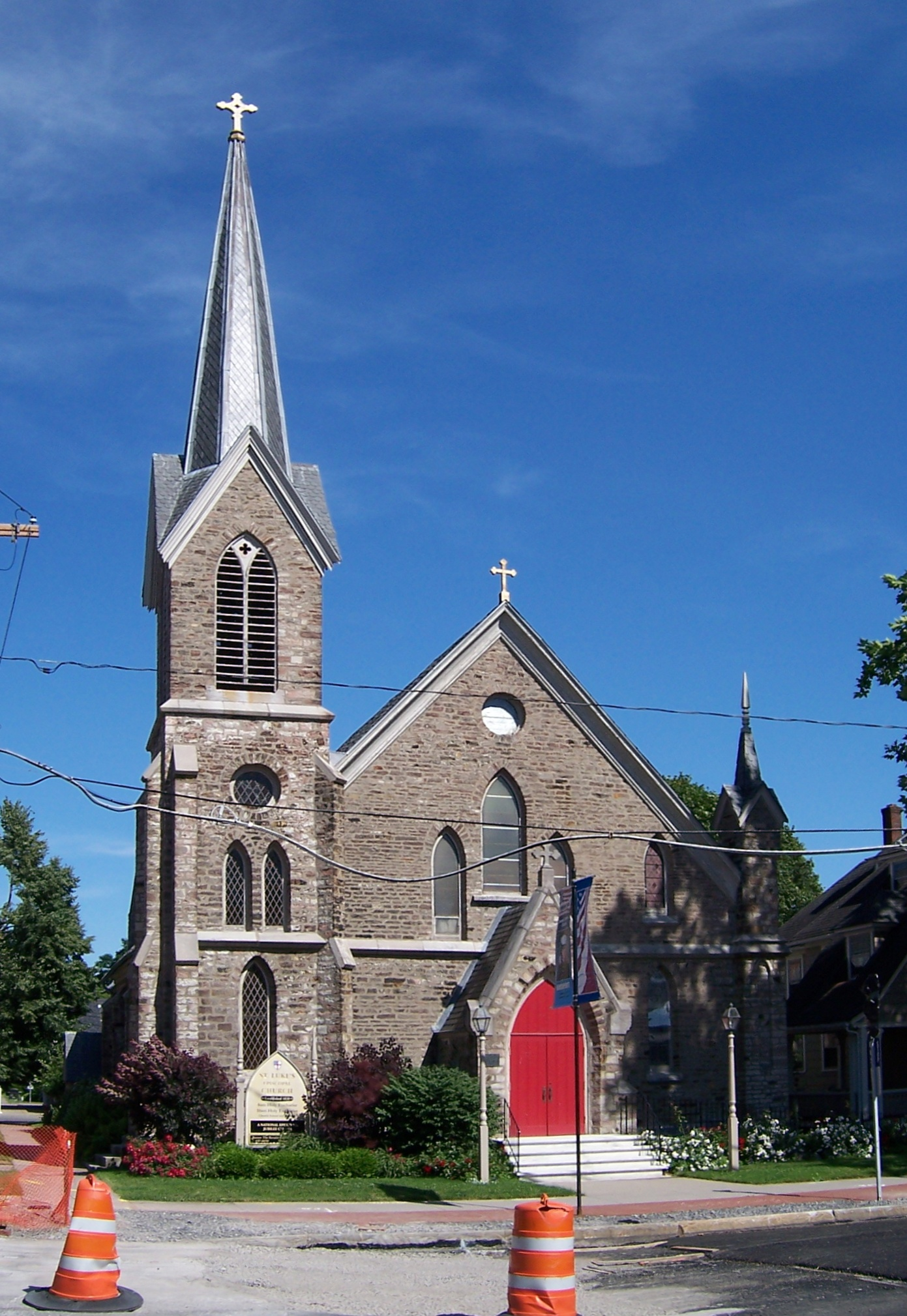
- St. Luke's Episcopal Church, July 2011

- Location within New York Location within the United States
- Location: 14 State St., Brockport, New York
- Coordinates: 43°12′51″N 77°56′18″W
- Area: less than one acre
- Architectural style: Late Gothic Revival, Romanesque, Gothic Revival
- NRHP reference No.: 90000686
- Added to NRHP: April 26, 1990

St. Luke's Episcopal Church is a historic Episcopal church complex located at Brockport in Monroe County, New York. The complex consists of an 1855 Gothic Revival-style church of Medina sandstone and 1903 Romanesque style parish hall. The eastern chancel window features a tripartite composition executed in favrile glass by the Tiffany studios of New York. A second grouping of three Tiffany favrile glass windows is located on the western wall of the nave above the narthex.

It was listed on the National Register of Historic Places in 1990.
