= Medina Armory =

- U.S. National Register of Historic Places
- New York State Register of Historic Places
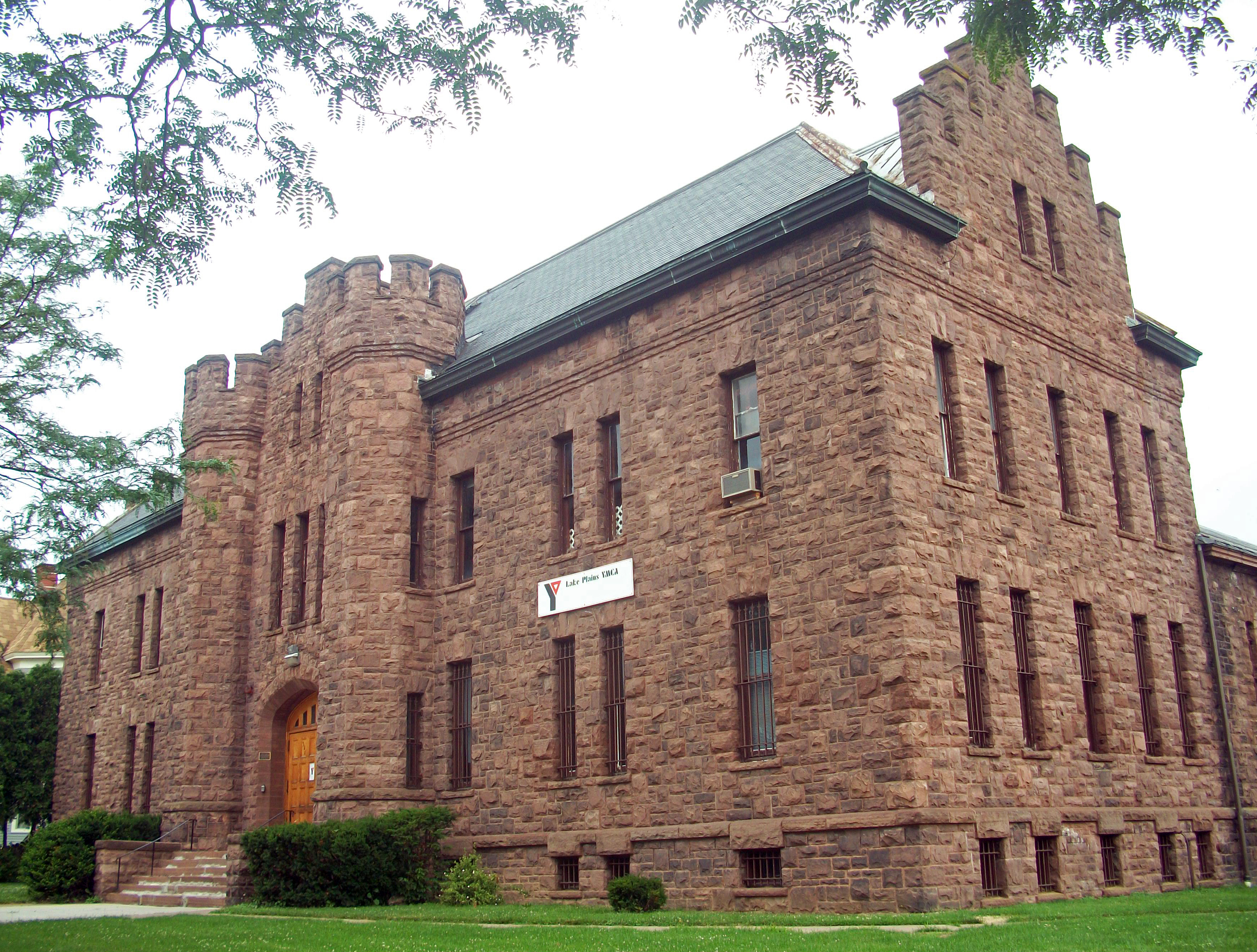
- South elevation and east profile, 2010

- Location within New York Location within the United States
- Location: Medina, NY
- Nearest city: Lockport
- Coordinates: 43°13′19″N 78°23′32″W
- Area: 1.1 acres (4,500 m^{2}).
- Built: 1901
- Architect: George L. Heins
- Architectural style: Late Victorian, Castellated Style
- MPS: Army National Guard Armories in New York State MPS
- NRHP reference No.: 95000399
- NYSRHP No.: 07341.000025

Significant dates
- Added to NRHP: April 13, 1995
- Designated NYSRHP: March 9, 1995

The Medina Armory is located on Pearl Street in Medina, New York, United States. It is a large stone building constructed at the beginning of the 20th century.

State architect George Heins designed it for what was at the time the 29th Separate Company of the New York Army National Guard. It was his first armory for the state. The 29th was later absorbed into other New York-based Guard and Reserve units. After closing in 1977, it is now the local YMCA. In 1995 it was listed on the National Register of Historic Places along with other New York armories.

== Building ==
The armory is located on a 1.1-acre (4,500 m^{2}) lot that takes up the eastern half of the block formed by Lee Place, Pearl Street, and Prospect Avenue (NY 63) a few blocks northeast of downtown Medina. The surrounding properties are all residential, with the exception of a large former school building to the west on Catherine Street. The terrain is level.

The building itself is a two-story structure of Medina sandstone laid in a random ashlar pattern with a raised foundation. It consists of two sections: the main administration building, facing south to Prospect Street, and an attached drill shed on the north. A modern flat-roofed garage is attached to the northeast of the drill shed, projecting eastward. The southeast portion of the lot is given over to a large lawn with some planted shrubs surrounding the flagpole.

In the center of the south (front) facade of the administration building is the projecting entrance pavilion. On either side two engaged octagonal towers rise to crenelated parapets. The entrance itself is a recessed segmental-arched sally port with a pair of paneled oak doors below a tripartite transom. Stepped gabled ends project from the hipped roof shingled in asphalt with standing seam metal. The tall, narrow windows have iron grilles on the first story, matched in the rectangular basement windows.

On the side elevations of the nine-bay drill shed is paired narrow flat-arched windows set off by buttresses. Secondary entrances on both sides have four-paneled doors with similar transoms to the front entrance. The north (rear) has three groups of tall, narrow windows with buttresses.

Inside, most of the original finishings remain. The entrance hall has a large oak staircase, the company meeting room a tin ceiling. The walls have their original oak baseboard and plaster; many of the oak doors are original. Many rooms had been partitioned at the time of the armory's listing on the Register. The drill shed has exposed steel trusses, wainscoted ceilings, a balcony, and wooden floors.

== History ==
Col. Hesikiah Bowen raised Bowen's Rifles, the precursor unit to the 29th, in 1838 in response to the escalating tensions of the Aroostook War in Maine, which threatened to start a third war between the United States and Britain. Hostilities were avoided, and the unit was never deployed, but it survived for several years afterward. Later another unit, Linus Beecher's Light Guards, replaced them although it was primarily a social organization. That unit eventually became the Pitts Light Guards.

In late 1891, the 29th was formally mustered under the command of Capt. A.S. Ross. Two other officers commanded 55 enlisted men. At first, they used the floors of a Main Street building, but soon the community began to agitate for the construction of an armory. Assemblyman Fred Downs lobbied the state government, and later in the decade, the project was approved. The 29th soon saw its first action during the Spanish–American War.

The present lot was acquired in 1899, and by September of that year the foundations were being dug. The state approved the completed building late in 1901, two years later. The land and construction together had cost $57,160 ($2.21 million in contemporary dollars).

It was the first of seven extant armories designed by George Heins, who had replaced Isaac Perry as New York's state architect. Like his predecessor, Heins used many features of medieval military architecture such as towers, crenelation, parapets, and sally ports, for an overall Gothic effect. His interpretations of those forms and details differ by being more modern and stylized than Perry's. A distinctive touch in Medina was the use of locally quarried Medina sandstone, at the time a highly popular material that was the county's major non-agricultural product.

Originally the armory had a flat roof. Renovations in 1912 gave it the current hip-gable combination. The following year the unit was called up to help suppress the streetcar strike in Buffalo. By then it would be known as Company F of the New York National Guard's Third Regiment.

In April 1917, the unit was deployed into World War I as part of the 27th Division, drawn entirely from the New York National Guard. A Buffalo unit was stationed in the armory in their absence as a home guard. In 1919, after the war, the unit became Company F of the 108th Infantry. During World War II, it was Company L of the 65th Regiment.

For the last three years of the Guard's use of the armory, the unit was Company C of the 174th Infantry. In 1977, the state announced it would be closed and its units moved to other locations. The Medina community formed the Armory Action Committee, not wanting to see the building become neglected. It worked to adapt the armory for local recreational use, partitioning the office space in the process. After 20 years, the Lake Plains YMCA bought the building from the state. was fully established in the building. It continues to operate, with over a thousand members and a wide range of programs.

== See also ==
- National Register of Historic Places listings in Orleans County, New York
