= Eagle Harbor, New York =

Coordinates: 43°15′12″N 78°15′11″W

Eagle Harbor is a hamlet in the town of Gaines, in Orleans County, New York, United States. It was said to have been named due to the discovery of a large bird's nest, presumably an eagle's nest, when the Erie Canal was surveyed. A clearing was made by Steven Abbott circa 1811-12, but the location did not experience significant growth until the construction of the Canal. In 1894, the village contained three general stores, a hotel, and livery stable, a barrel factory, two blacksmiths, a wagon shop, a church and washing machine factory, meat market, grist mill, warehouse, two churches, two schools, and approximately 350 inhabitants.

On August 3, 1927, a local farmer observed a three-foot square hole in the south embankment of the Otter Creek gully expand into a fifty-foot wide hole in the wall of the Erie Canal. Millions of gallons of water flooded into nearby fields, resulting in the formation of a massive lake that submerged homes and crops. Over 250 men were hired to work night and day to repair the damage, requiring over two weeks of manual labor and costing the State of New York over $250,000.
