= East Gaines, New York =

Coordinates: 43.290°N 78.135°W

East Gaines is a hamlet in the town of Gaines in Orleans County, New York, United States. In 1826, Peter Runion constructed the East Gaines Hotel, later known as the Perry House, which became an important location for settlers traveling by way of Ridge Road. The hamlet contained a post office, store, blacksmith shop, a Baptist church, and twelve to fifteen houses in 1894.
