= Childs, New York =

Hamlet in New York, United States

Coordinates: 43°17′12″N 78°11′30″W

Childs is a hamlet in the town of Gaines in Orleans County, New York, United States. It is named after Judge Henry Childs and was previously known as "Proctor's Corners" and "Fair Haven." Childs is the location of the Cobblestone Historic District that was listed on the National Register of Historic Places and designated a National Historic Landmark in 1993.
