= Millville, New York =

Hamlet in New York, United States

Coordinates: 43°12′27″N 78°19′29″W

Millville is a hamlet in the town of Shelby in Orleans County, New York, United States.

First settled in the mid-1810s, Millville grew as a result of the mills located there to tap the abundant water available in the three streams that run through the hamlet. T.O. Castle & son mercantile (built of limestone). Still exist today at the corner of E Shelby and Maple Ridge Rd. Built ca. 1849, the T.O. Castle and Son General Store (National Registry of Historic Places 1/25/22) is a two-story, three-bay commercial building constructed of locally quarried stone and sited at an important crossroads location. Under the operation of Thomas Oliver Castle, a prominent member of the community, the store served as the geographical and social center of the hamlet of Millville, providing for the needs of a growing farm community and the staff and students of the Millville Academy until the 1870s.The building is also significant as one of a small number of documented stone commercialbuildings in New York State and as an example of a modest Greek Revival-style store. In its early days, before the clearing of the land reduced the volume and regularity of the water volume in the streams, the hamlet could claim three saw mills, a grist mill and a turning mill. In the 1870s, the hamlet had an academy, three churches, a grocery, dry goods store, tannery, foundry, wagon shop, school, post office, and a cluster of about 30 houses.

In 2007, the Millville Cemetery was listed on the National Register of Historic Places. In December 2022 T.O. Castle & Son General Store was listed to National Register of Historic Places. It is the first building in Millville NY to bestow this designation.
