= Stevens–Sommerfeldt House =

Historic house in New York, United States

- U.S. National Register of Historic Places
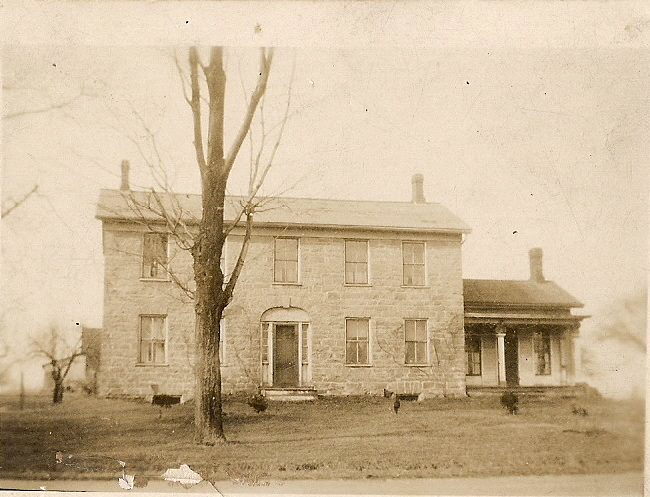
- The house in 1942
- Location: 5482 Holley-Byron Rd., Clarendon, New York
- Coordinates: 43°08′52″N 78°04′15″W
- Area: 56 acres (23 ha)
- Built: Late 1820s
- Built by: Stonemason "Murphy"
- Architectural style: Federal
- NRHP reference No.: 15000268
- Added to NRHP: May 26, 2015

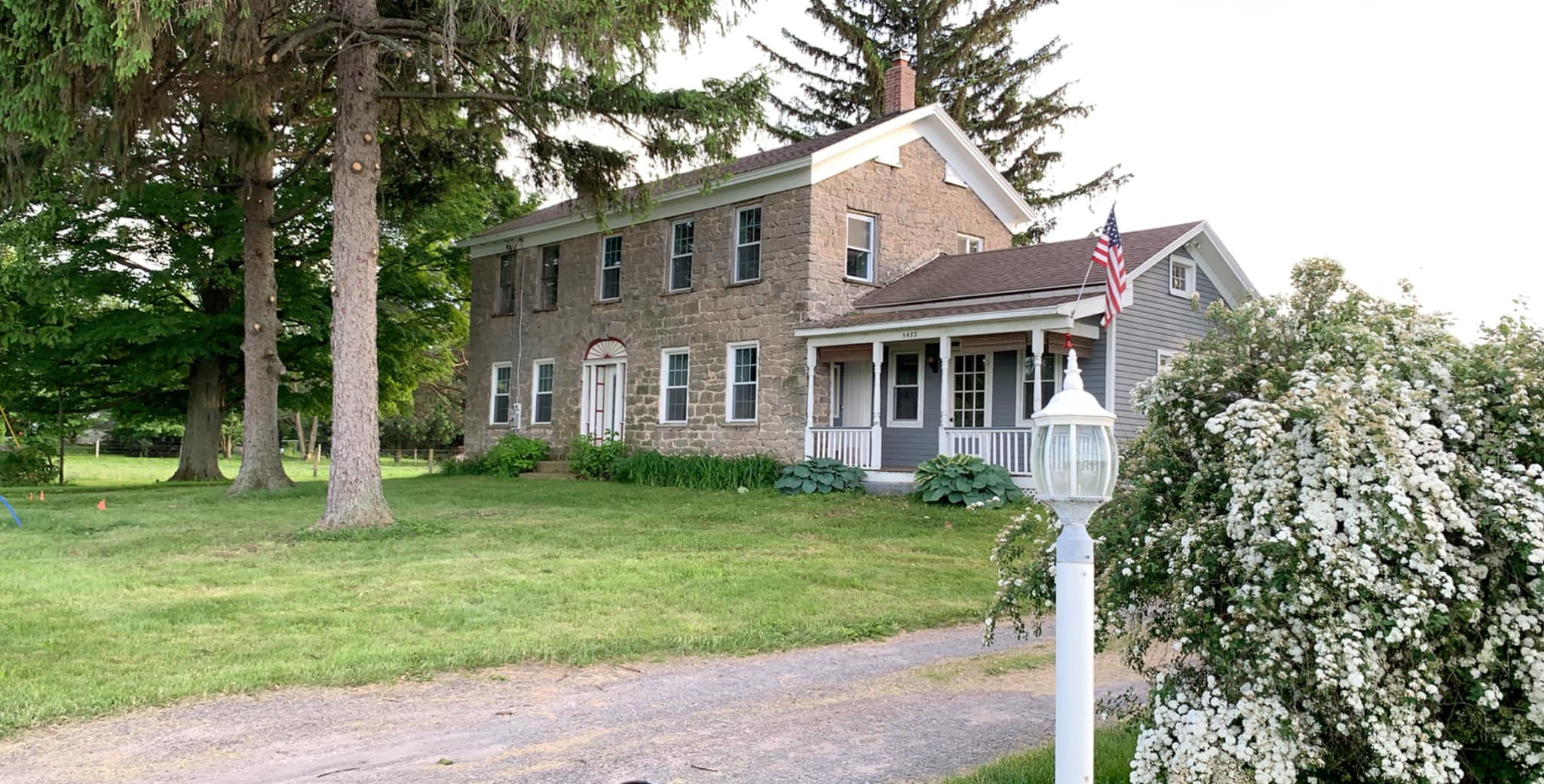
The house in 2017

Stevens–Sommerfeldt House is a historic home located near Clarendon in Orleans County, New York. It was built in 1820s, and is a two-story, five-bay, Federal style stone house. It has an original one-story stone lean-to and a small one-story wood-frame addition built around 1860. Also on the property are the contributing hen house (c. 1910), a wooden pig barn and a corn crib (c. 1910). The house is a rare remaining example of stone construction from the early 1800s.

It was listed on the National Register of Historic Places in 2015.

Built by an early settler of the area in the late 1820s, it is constructed of stone which was quarried on the property. The two-story, five-bay stone house has an original one-story stone lean-to on the rear (west) elevation. A small one-story wood-frame addition was added to the north end around 1860. The building reflects the translation of high-designed Federal style details to the available materials, skills and resources of Orleans County during the 1820s. While built of roughly cut, irregular shaped stones, the exterior exhibits an awareness of sophisticated design feature, such as the use of key stones in the window lintels, an elliptical arch with keystone above the main entrance and quarter-elliptical windows in each gable end. Interior details include modest wood trim and moldings and split-board lath with plaster. Still a working farm, its setting evokes the feel of the nineteenth-century agricultural enterprise it was and would be recognizable to the original owner. The development of the property is representative of the western migration of early nineteenth century America, the transformation of wilderness into productive farmland and the subsequent success of the farmers due to the convenience of shipping goods on the Erie Canal, which opened in 1825. For all but six years of its history, the Stevens–Sommerfeldt House has been owned by only two families.

The Stevens–Sommerfeldt House is locally significant as a rare surviving example of a late Federal period stone house located near Clarendon, Orleans County, New York. Constructed of limestone quarried on-site in the late 1820s for John Stevens, an early pioneer settler to the region, the house also represents the early era of settlement and development in rural Orleans County. For its associations with the early settlement and development of Clarendon, the property is significant. The period of significance begins with the initial construction of the house, ca. late 1820s, and concludes in ca. 1950. This era encompasses all significant architectural changes made to the property by the long-time owners the Stevens and Sommerfeldt families.

The stone Federal style residence was said to have been constructed for John Stevens and his family by a local stonemason known only as "Murphy". The Stevens family, which arrived in Orleans County in 1813, was one of the earliest settlers to the Clarendon area. John Stevens himself played a large role in helping develop and settle the “Honest Hill” area, as this small region became known. Stonemason Murphy is credited with two other nearby limestone residences Federal style residences were built in the area around this same era, although the Stevens–Sommerfeldt House remains the best and most intact example of this group. The architecture of the house reflects the use of pattern books and other design guides, as it is stylistically a typical example of a Federal style building, with its central elliptical arched entry and five-bay, side-gabled profile. However, elements of the building reflect adaptations to the technology, skills, and materials available in rural Orleans County during this era. The building also has an uncommon one-story projection along the entire width of its rear (west) elevation, which appears to have been part of the original construction of the building. Around 1861, when John's son, Merrick Stevens, took up residence in the house, a one-story kitchen wing was added to modernize and update the building. The house was passed down through three generations, and the Stevens family owned the property until 1917.

The house has also been owned for many decades by the Sommerfeldt family and is now home to the fourth generation. The family continues to maintain the agricultural use of the property, and the house itself is being rehabilitated in stages for use as a dwelling once again.
