= Gaines, New York =

- Town
- Location in Orleans County and the state of New York.

- Location of New York in the United States
- Coordinates: 43°15′45″N 78°11′28″W
- Country: United States
- State: New York
- County: Orleans

Area
  - Total: 34.46 sq mi (89.25 km^{2})
  - Land: 34.42 sq mi (89.15 km^{2})
  - Water: 0.039 sq mi (0.10 km^{2})
- Elevation: 430 ft (131 m)

Population (2010)
  - Total: 3,378
  - Estimate (2016): 3,227
  - Density: 94/sq mi (36.2/km^{2})
- Time zone: UTC-5 (Eastern (EST))
  - Summer (DST): UTC-4 (EDT)
- FIPS code: 36-27958
- GNIS feature ID: 0978981

Gaines is a town in Orleans County, New York, United States. The population was 3,226 at the 2020 census, and 3,378 at the 2010 census. The town is named after General Edmund P. Gaines, who defended the area during the War of 1812.

The Town of Gaines is in the north-central part of the county and contains part of the Village of Albion, the county seat.

== History ==
The Town of Gaines was established in 1816 from a partition of the Town of Ridgeway before Orleans County was established.

In 1890, the population of Gaines was 2,070.

== Geography ==
According to the United States Census Bureau, the town has a total area of 34.4 square miles (89 km^{2}), of which 34.4 square miles (89 km^{2}) is land and 0.04 square miles (0.10 km^{2}) (0.12%) is water.

The Erie Canal touches the southern boundary of the town at Gaines Basin, and the Oak Orchard River flows through the northwest part of the town entering the Town of Carlton. The northernmost point on the Erie Canal is located in Gaines.

New York State Route 104 (Ridge Road) is an east–west highway across the town. New York State Route 98 (Oak Orchard Road) is a north–south highway, intersecting NY-104 north of the village of Albion at Childs. New York State Route 279 (Gaines Waterport Road) is a north–south highway intersecting NY-104 at Gaines village.

== Demographics ==
Historical population
Census	Pop.	Note	%±
1820	1,134		—
1830	2,121		87.0%
1840	2,268		6.9%
1850	2,722		20.0%
1860	2,542		−6.6%
1870	2,196		−13.6%
1880	2,338		6.5%
1890	2,070		−11.5%
1900	1,889		−8.7%
1910	1,946		3.0%
1920	1,669		−14.2%
1930	1,702		2.0%
1940	1,667		−2.1%
1950	1,812		8.7%
1960	2,090		15.3%
1970	2,385		14.1%
1980	2,692		12.9%
1990	3,025		12.4%
2000	3,740		23.6%
2010	3,378		−9.7%
2016 (est.)	3,227		−4.5%
U.S. Decennial Census

As of the census of 2000, there were 3,740 people, 1,474 households, and 986 families residing in the town. The population density was 108.8 inhabitants per square mile (42.0/km^{2}). There were 1,609 housing units at an average density of 46.8 per square mile (18.1/km^{2}). The racial makeup of the town was 91.63% White, 4.41% African American, 0.32% Native American, 0.13% Asian, 2.19% from other races, and 1.31% from two or more races. Hispanic or Latino of any race were 4.14% of the population.

There were 1,474 households, out of which 32.0% had children under the age of 18 living with them, 50.0% were married couples living together, 11.5% had a female householder with no husband present, and 33.1% were non-families. 27.2% of all households were made up of individuals, and 16.8% had someone living alone who was 65 years of age or older. The average household size was 2.54 and the average family size was 3.06.

In the town, the population was spread out, with 26.4% under the age of 18, 7.9% from 18 to 24, 28.0% from 25 to 44, 21.9% from 45 to 64, and 15.8% who were 65 years of age or older. The median age was 38 years. For every 100 females, there were 92.6 males. For every 100 females age 18 and over, there were 86.8 males.

The median income for a household in the town was $32,604, and the median income for a family was $38,523. Males had a median income of $30,709 versus $21,917 for females. The per capita income for the town was $16,823. About 7.9% of families and 10.3% of the population were below the poverty line, including 20.4% of those under age 18 and 7.0% of those age 65 or over.

== Communities and locations in the Town of Gaines ==
- Albion – The Village of Albion is the county seat of Orleans County and a port of the Erie Canal.
- Childs – A hamlet east of Gaines village on Route 104 at the junction of NY-98. It is named after Judge Henry Childs and previously known as "Proctor's Corners" and "Fair Haven." It is the location of the Cobblestone Historic District.
- Eagle Harbor – A hamlet in the south part of the town. An eagle's nest was found here while the Erie Canal was being dug, giving the location its name.
- East Gaines – A hamlet east of Gaines village on NY-104.
- Five Corners – A hamlet south of Childs on NY-98.
- Gaines – The hamlet of Gaines was established in 1832. It is located at the junction of Routes NY-104 and NY-279.
- Gaines Basin – A hamlet named after a wide place in the Erie Canal for barges to turn around.
- Waterport Pond – A wide part of the Oak Orchard River is partly in the town.
- West Gaines – A hamlet west of Gaines village on NY-104 that is now a small cluster of houses.

== Notable people ==
- Charles Anderson Dana, (1819–1897), managing editor of the New-York Tribune, Assistant Secretary of War during Civil War, lived at Gaines Basin as a child.
- Horace Greeley, (1811–1872), founder and editor of New-York Tribune, owned property at Childs during 1860s.
- Almanzor Hutchinson, farmer and state legislator
