= Medina sandstone =

Orleans County NY sandstone quarry history

Medina sandstone is a geographic subset of the Medina Group stratigraphic formation in New York State and beyond. The name refers specifically to sandstone first quarried in Medina, New York, and later quarried in other locations in Orleans County and adjacent quarries in Monroe County to the east and Niagara County to the west. Medina sandstone was widely used to pave the streets of early U.S. cities because it was hard enough to stand long and severe service, and in wearing, it maintained a flat, even surface where other common materials, such as granite, would wear round and acquire a smooth, slippery polish. The Medina stone was also a highly desirable building stone that could be obtained in colors from light gray to pink, red, and brown. It was used in the construction of hundreds of homes, churches, public buildings, monuments, and other structures from the 1830s to the mid-1900s.

== Geology ==
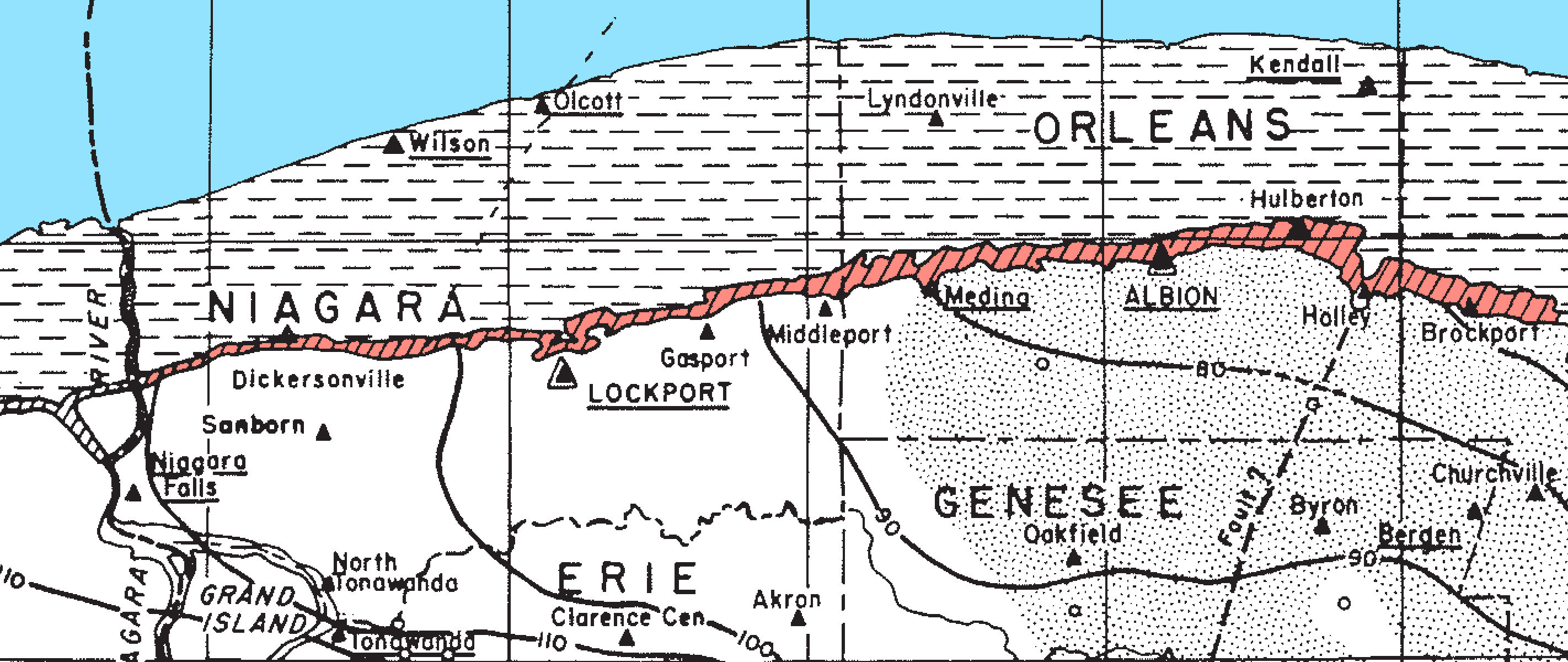
The area in red denotes the location of Medina sandstone near the surface where it was conveniently quarried.

Medina sandstone is an early Silurian (445-425 million years ago) stone deposited between the Ordovician Queenston Shale (below) and the mid Silurian Clinton Group (above). The stone is made up of quartzose sand in fine grains, cemented more or less strongly by siliceous and ferruginous matter. The prevailing color is a brown or brown-red, but gray-white and variegated red and white also are common shades. In texture,the mass is usually fine-grained. The strata lie dipping at a small angle southward, and the stone is remarkably even bedded. At nearly all localities there are two systems of joints, at right angles to one another, which divide the rock into blocks, making it relatively easy to mine. The stone is near the surface and easily quarried in a narrow band about 32 miles long that follows the path of the Erie Canal between Rochester and Lockport in Western New York.

== History ==
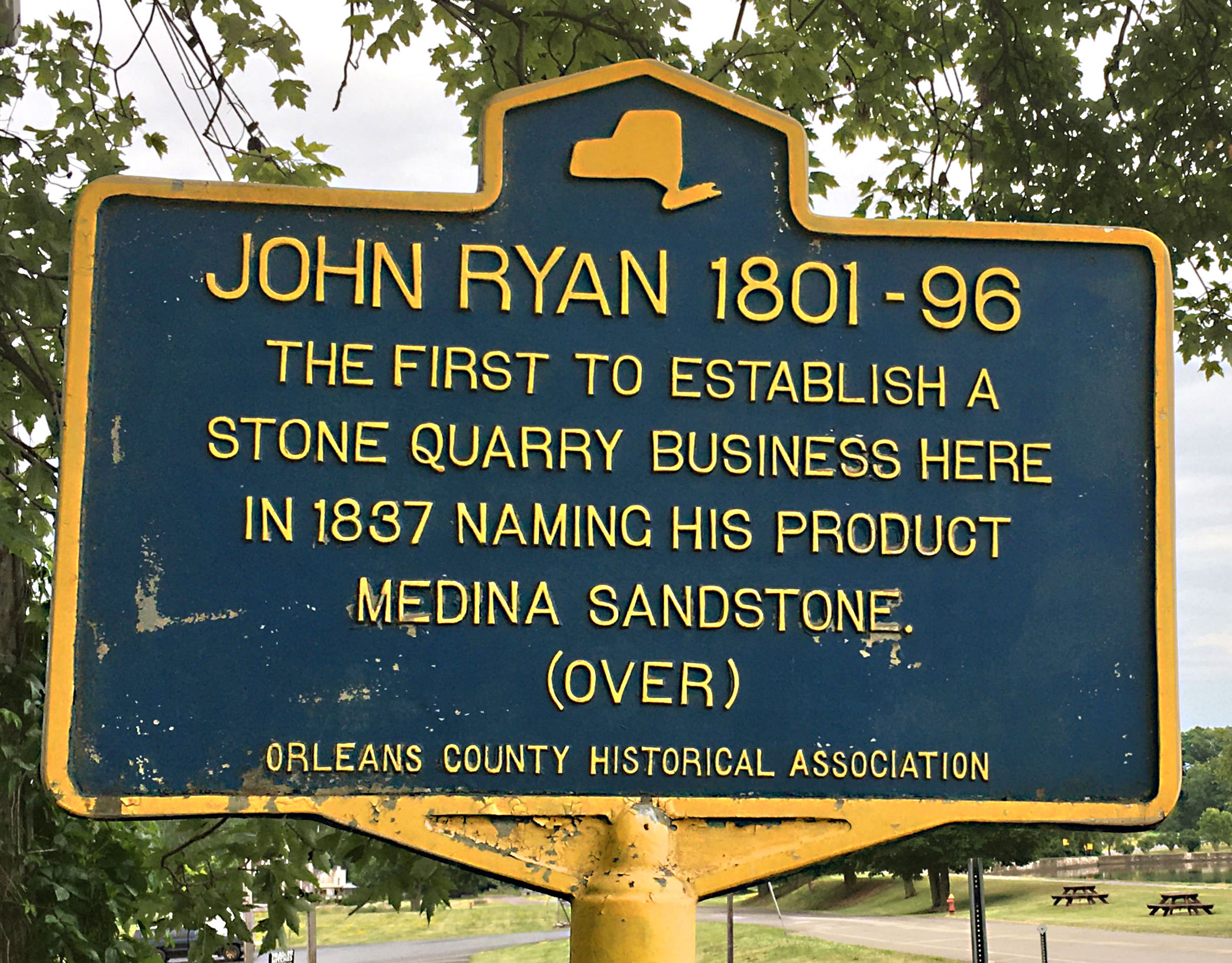
Historic marker noting John Ryan and the first commercial Medina Sandstone quarry

Early settlers in Western New York found good building stone in the gorges of the Genesee River in Rochester, Oak Orchard Creek in Medina, and Eighteen Mile Creek in Lockport. This stone was used to construct structures during the 1820s and early 1830s. Later, the Erie Canal was constructed along the band of Medina sandstone through Orleans County. The first commercial quarry was opened by John Ryan in Medina in 1837, and the quarries expanded eastward to Albion starting in 1858 and Holley in 1881. At the peak of the Medina sandstone quarry industry in the 1890s, there were as many as 48 quarries employing up to 2000 laborers. Immigrant labor played an important role in operating the quarries and workers came in large numbers from England, Ireland, France, Germany, Poland and Italy. This sandstone was employed widely for “street work” such as cobblestones and curbs and the higher quality stone was used for ashlar blocks for foundations, walls, and other structural components of homes, churches, and other buildings. In 1908, the total value of sandstone quarried in Orleans County was $408,287, of which “street work” stone accounted for about 85% of the total, with the remaining 15% from building stone.

In 1902, many of the individually operated quarries totaling nearly 2,000 acres were consolidated in the Medina Quarry Company. This company significantly increased the capital investment, and output was increased through purchases of steam powered quarry equipment and other updated technologies. Due to charges of monopolistic operation, this company ceased operation in 1905 and was reorganized as the Orleans County Quarry Company, but the demand for sandstone was severely curtailed by World War I, the 1918 pandemic, and growing application of concrete building blocks and asphalt paving of roads. A few quarries continued into the 1950s and some were temporarily reopened as late as the 1980s to provide stone for building renovations.

== Viewing today ==
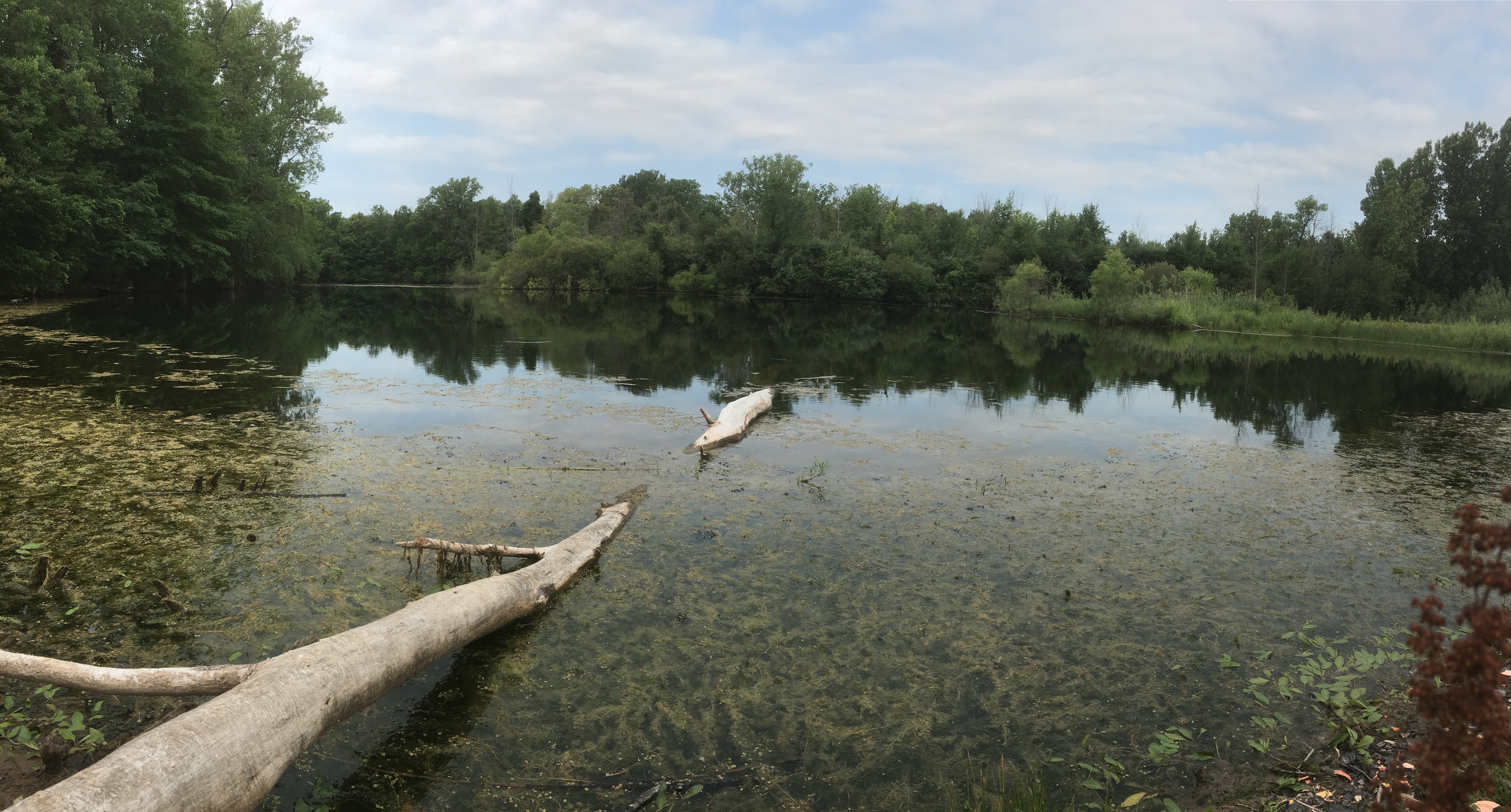
The old McCormick quarry in Medina, NY.

Many of the old Medina sandstone quarries can be seen along the route of the Erie Canal between Brockport and Lockport. Today nearly all these old quarries are flooded and a few are owned by camping resorts, rod and gun clubs or conservation clubs and used for recreational activities.

Buildings made from Medina sandstone still stand today. Several Orleans County sandstone buildings can be viewed online through the Empire State Immersive Experiences website. They include 360º images and tours.

== Structures incorporating Medina sandstone ==
Medina Sandstone Hall of Fame was established in 2013 by the Medina Sandstone Society. The Hall of Fame annually recognizes important structures constructed primarily of Medina sandstone. The buildings inducted include:

- 2013 St. Paul's Cathedral in Buffalo, Richardson-Olmsted Complex in Buffalo, Saint Bernard's Seminary in Rochester, Pullman Memorial Universalist Church in Albion, Medina Armory / YMCA in Medina, St. Mary's Catholic Church in Medina
- 2014 St. Louis RC Church and Delaware-Asbury Church / Babeville in Buffalo, Mt. Albion Civil War Tower in Albion, St. Peter Cathedral in Erie, Pa
- 2015 Connecticut Street Armory in Buffalo, St. John's Episcopal Church in Medina, St. Mary's R.C. in Holley, “Martin Manor” residence in Buffalo
- 2016 Hillside Cemetery in Holley, Sonnenberg Manor in Canandaigua, First Presbyterian Church of Buffalo, Emma Flower Taylor Mansion in Watertown
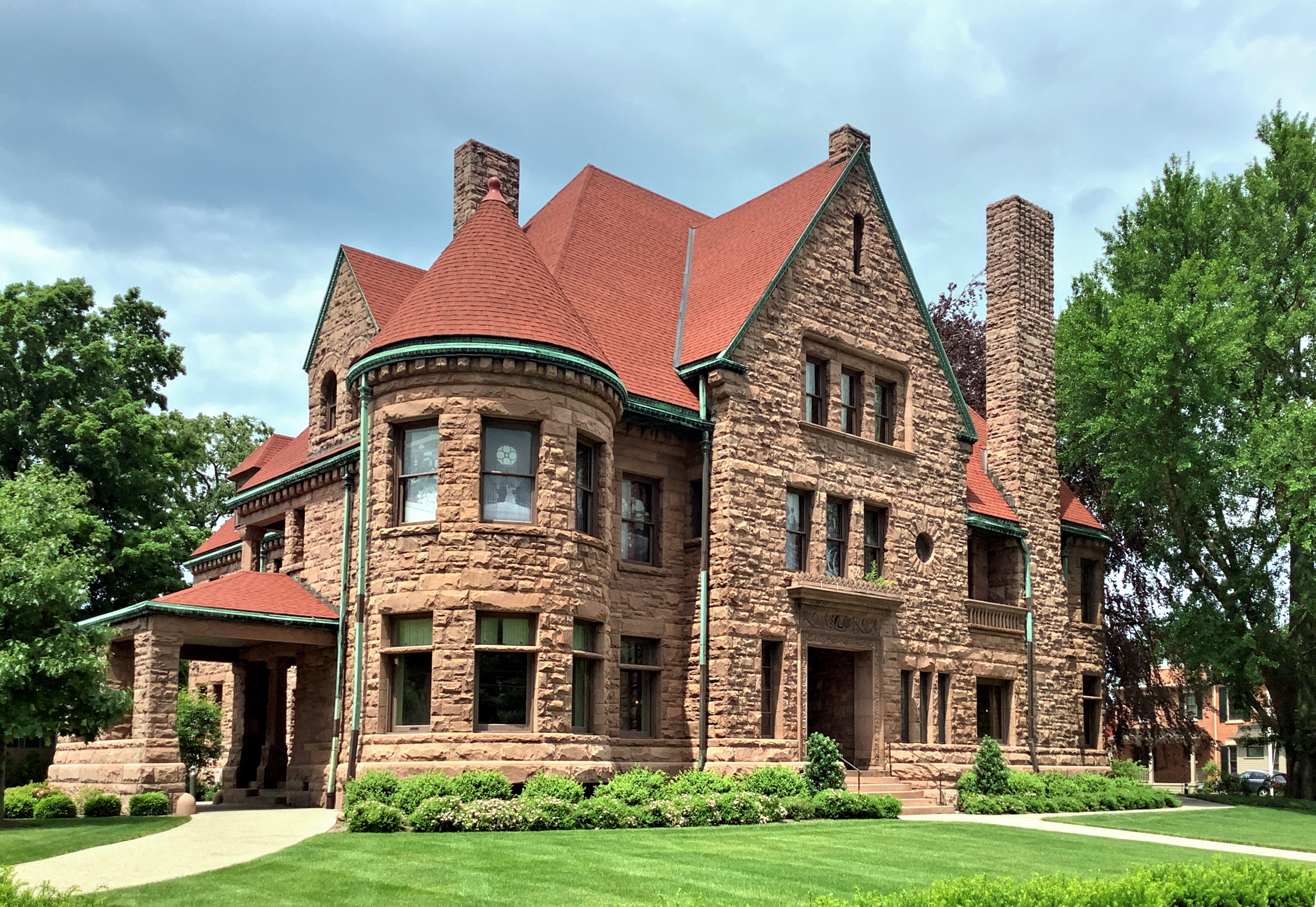
- Watson Curtze Mansion in Erie, PA built with Medina Sandstone
  2017 First Presbyterian Church in Albion, Holy Sepulchre Cemetery in Rochester, First Lutheran Church in Jamestown, Richmond Memorial Library in Batavia
- 2018 James Prendergast Library in Jamestown, First Presbyterian / Lafayette Lofts in Buffalo, St. John's Episcopal Church in Clifton Springs, NY
- 2019 Zion Episcopal Church in Palmyra, St. Peter's Episcopal in Geneva, St. Peter's RC Church in Rome, NY, Watson-Curtze Mansion in Erie, PA
- 2020 No HOF Inductions
- 2021 St. Mary's RC Church in Canandaigua, NY, St. Luke's Episcopal Church in Brockport, Bent's Opera House in Medina
- 2022 St. Joseph's RC Church, Lyceum and Chapel in Albion, NY, Ryan Quarry House in Town of Clarendon, Erie Canal Culvert in Town of Ridgeway
- 2023 First Baptist Church in Medina, NY, Hamlin Beach State Park in Hamlin, NY, Robin Hill Manor in Lyndonville, NY, Ephraim Masten Homestead in Medina, NY
- 2024 Charlotte-Genesee Lighthouse in Rochester, NY, First United Methodist Church in Penn Yan, NY, Mt. Albion Cemetery in Albion, NY, St. Luke's Episcopal Church in Jamestown, NY

== Bibliography ==
- Friday, Jim, 2021, "History of Sandstone in Orleans County NY", LCCN 2021-901672
- Rhoades, Mariana Louise, 2023, "Stone Industry in Orleans County, NY 1820-1930", ISBN 979-8218395650
