= List of county routes in Orleans County, New York =

County routes in Orleans County, New York, are not signed in any form, serving as little more than references for inventory purposes. A single road may—and often does—have multiple designations for different segments of the road. Parts of two New York state routes—New York State Route 237 and New York State Route 279—are maintained by Orleans County and are assigned county route designations for inventory purposes.

== Routes 1–50 ==
Route	Length (mi)	Length (km)	From	Via	To	Notes
CR 1	2.06	3.32	NY 237 / CR 57A	Kenmor Road in Kendall	NY 272 / NY 360	
CR 2	2.37	3.81	CR 21 / CR 30 on Albion–Gaines town line	Albion–Eagle Harbor Road	Albion village line in Albion	
CR 3	1.25	2.01	NY 387	Telegraph Road in Murray	CR 12 / CR 24 / CR 54	
CR 4	2.49	4.01	CR 10	Knowlesville Road in Ridgeway	NY 104 / CR 66	
CR 5	2.22	3.57	CR 25 / CR 99	Eagle Harbor Road in Barre	CR 45B	
CR 6	2.25	3.62	CR 11	Kent Road in Carlton	NY 18	
CR 8	1.52	2.45	CR 18	East Shelby Road in Shelby	NY 31A	
CR 10	0.92	1.48	NY 31	Knowlesville Road in Ridgeway	CR 4	
CR 11	4.49	7.23	NY 31 in Albion	Densmore and Kent Roads	CR 6 in Gaines	
CR 12	0.64	1.03	CR 24	Hulberton Road in Murray	CR 3 / CR 24 / CR 54	
CR 13	1.00	1.61	CR 23	Carr Road in Kendall	NY 237 / CR 57A / CR 70	Former routing of NY 18
CR 15	0.81	1.30	Genesee County line (becomes CR 9)	Oakfield Road in Barre	CR 25	
CR 18	1.10	1.77	CR 28	East Shelby Road in Shelby	CR 8	
CR 20	1.24	2.00	CR 36A / CR 106 on Shelby–Barre town line	Taylor Hill Road	NY 31 in Ridgeway	Former routing of NY 31A
CR 21	0.41	0.66	CR 2 / CR 30	Eagle Harbor–Waterport Road in Gaines	CR 44	
CR 22	1.21	1.95	CR 30A	Richs Corners Road in Albion	NY 31	
CR 23	1.46	2.35	CR 51	Carr Road in Kendall	CR 13	Former routing of NY 18
CR 24 (1)	0.62	1.00	NY 31	Hulberton Road in Murray	CR 12	
CR 24 (2)	1.62	2.61	CR 3 / CR 12 / CR 54	Hulberton Road in Murray	CR 33	
CR 25	0.95	1.53	CR 15	Oakfield Road in Barre	CR 5 / CR 99	
CR 25B	0.87	1.40	NY 98	East Barre Road in Barre	CR 36B	
CR 26	3.16	5.09	NY 279 / CR 104	Oak Orchard River Road in Carlton	NY 18 / CR 55	
CR 28	2.71	4.36	Genesee County line (becomes CR 23)	East Shelby Road in Shelby	CR 18	
CR 29	3.58	5.76	Lyndonville village line	Platten Road in Yates	CR 49 / CR 57	
CR 30	1.12	1.80	CR 45	Eagle Harbor–West Barre Road in Albion	CR 2 / CR 21	
CR 30A	0.43	0.69	NY 31A	Richs Corners Road in Albion	CR 22	
CR 31	2.79	4.49	NY 104 / CR 44 in Gaines	Eagle Harbor–Waterport Road	NY 279 / CR 102 / CR 103 in Carlton	
CR 32	3.27	5.26	NY 104 in Murray	Peter Smith Road	CR 51 / CR 95 in Kendall	
CR 33	0.74	1.19	CR 24	Hulberton Road in Murray	NY 104	
CR 34	1.01	1.63	Holley village line	Hurd Road in Murray	CR 42 / CR 54	
CR 35	2.06	3.32	NY 31	Culvert Road in Ridgeway	CR 72	
CR 36A	0.25	0.40	CR 20 / CR 106	County House Road in Barre	CR 45A	
CR 36B	0.26	0.42	CR 25B	East Barre Road in Barre	CR 69	
CR 37	0.48	0.77	NY 98 at Lake Ontario State Parkway	Point Breeze Road in Carlton	Waterloo Street	
CR 39A	1.03	1.66	CR 28 in Shelby	Podunk Road	Genesee County line on Barre–Oakfield town line	
CR 39B	3.64	5.86	CR 52 / CR 87	Salt Works Road in Shelby	NY 31 / CR 65	
CR 40	2.06	3.32	NY 31A in Clarendon	Fancher Road	NY 31 in Murray	
CR 41	3.22	5.18	Shelby town line	Fruit Avenue in Ridgeway	NY 104 / CR 86	
CR 42	0.97	1.56	CR 34 / CR 54	Hurd Road in Murray	NY 104	
CR 43	2.06	3.32	NY 237	Creek Road in Kendall	NY 272	
CR 44	1.30	2.09	CR 21	Eagle Harbor–Waterport Road in Gaines	NY 104 / CR 31	
CR 44A	2.15	3.46	Albion village line	Zig Zag Road in Gaines	CR 11	
CR 45	1.20	1.93	CR 45A / CR 45B / CR 74	Eagle Harbor–West Barre Road in Albion	CR 30	
CR 45A	2.90	4.67	CR 36A	West County House Road in Albion	CR 45 / CR 45B / CR 74	
CR 45B	2.31	3.72	CR 5 in Barre	Eagle Harbor–West Barre Road	CR 45 / CR 45A / CR 74 in Albion	
CR 45C			CR 45A	West County House Road in Albion	CR 45 / CR 45B / CR 74	Former number; now part of CR 45A
CR 46	1.68	2.70	NY 269	Millers Road in Yates	CR 61	
CR 47	1.59	2.56	NY 31A / CR 59 in Clarendon	South Holley Road	NY 237 in Holley	
CR 48	0.74	1.19	NY 18	Lakeside Road in Carlton	Lakeside Road Extension	Formerly CR 62 and CR 43
CR 49	3.51	5.65	CR 29 / CR 57	Platten and Oak Orchard River Roads in Carlton	NY 279 / CR 103 / CR 104	
CR 50	0.69	1.11	Niagara County line	Niagara–Orleans County Line Road	CR 82	

== Routes 51 and up ==
Route	Length (mi)	Length (km)	From	Via	To	Notes
CR 51	1.59	2.56	NY 18 in Carlton	Carr Road	CR 23 in Kendall	Former routing of NY 18
CR 52	2.32	3.73	Genesee County line (becomes CR 43)	Salt Works Road in Shelby	CR 39B / CR 87	
CR 53	2.43	3.91	NY 104	Oak Orchard River Road in Ridgeway	CR 57 / CR 80	
CR 54	2.61	4.20	CR 3 / CR 12 / CR 24	Telegraph Road in Murray	CR 34 / CR 42	
CR 55 (1)	0.19	0.31	NY 18 / CR 26	Marsh Creek Road in Carlton	Dead End at Oak Orchard River	
CR 55 (2)	0.04	0.06	Dead End at Oak Orchard River	Marsh Creek Road in Carlton	NY 98	
CR 56	1.11	1.79	CR 74	West County House Road in Albion	NY 98	
CR 57	3.32	5.34	CR 53 / CR 80 in Ridgeway	Knowlesville and Yates–Carlton Town Line Roads	NY 18 / CR 67 on Yates–Carlton line	
CR 57A	1.26	2.03	NY 18 / NY 237	Kendall Road in Kendall	NY 237 / CR 13 / CR 70	Entire length overlaps with NY 237; Part north of CR 1 was formerly part of NY 18
CR 59	2.08	3.35	CR 73	South Holley Road in Clarendon	NY 31A / CR 47	
CR 61	1.71	2.75	CR 46	Millers Road in Yates	Lyndonville village line	
CR 63	1.29	2.08	Monroe County line (becomes CR 238)	Orleans–Monroe County Line Road	NY 104 / NY 272	
CR 63-1	1.90	3.06	NY 18 / NY 63	Lyndonville Road in Yates	Lake Ontario shoreline	Formerly part of NY 63; highway transferred to Orleans County on April 1, 1989
CR 64	3.14	5.05	NY 31 / CR 76	Transit Road on Albion, Murray, and Gaines town lines	NY 104	
CR 65	1.09	1.75	NY 31 / CR 39B in Shelby	Salt Works Road	NY 31E in Ridgeway	
CR 66	1.54	2.48	NY 104 / CR 4	Knowlesville Road in Ridgeway	CR 53 / CR 57	
CR 67	1.16	1.87	NY 18 / CR 57	Yates–Carlton Town Line Road on Yates and Carlton town lines	CR 93	
CR 68	3.07	4.94	NY 279 / CR 103	Waterport–Carlton Road in Carlton	NY 98	
CR 69	2.95	4.75	CR 36B	East Barre Road in Barre	NY 31A	
CR 70	2.20	3.54	NY 237 / CR 13 / CR 57A	Kendall Road in Kendall	Lake Ontario shoreline	Part south of the Lake Ontario State Parkway overlaps with NY 237
CR 71	2.37	3.81	CR 44A	Crandall Road in Gaines	NY 104 / CR 78	
CR 72	1.25	2.01	CR 35	Culvert Road in Ridgeway	NY 104	
CR 73	2.23	3.59	Genesee County line (becomes CR 41)	South Holley Road in Clarendon	CR 59	
CR 74	1.92	3.09	CR 45 / CR 45A / CR 45B	West County House Road in Albion	CR 56	
CR 75	2.05	3.30	NY 237 / CR 70	Lake Shore Road in Kendall	NY 272	
CR 76 (1)	3.77	6.07	CR 22 in Albion	Holley, Transit and Hindsburg Roads	NY 31 in Murray	
CR 76 (2)	0.86	1.38	CR 76 (segment 1)	Transit Road on Albion–Murray town line	NY 31 / CR 64	
CR 77			NY 31	Holley and Fancher Roads in Murray	NY 31	Former number; now part of CR 40 and CR 76
CR 78	3.59	5.78	NY 104 / CR 71 in Gaines	Sawyer Road	NY 18 in Carlton	
CR 79	2.93	4.72	CR 4 in Ridgeway	Eagle Harbor–Knowlesville Road	CR 21 on Gaines–Albion town line	
CR 80			CR 66	Knowlesville Road in Ridgeway	CR 53 / CR 57	Former number; now part of CR 66; consisted solely of bridge over Oak Orchard River
CR 82	3.89	6.26	Niagara County line	Lake Shore Road in Yates	CR 63-1	
CR 83	2.50	4.02	Mansfield Road	Hindsburg Road in Clarendon	CR 91	
CR 84	2.00	3.22	CR 90	Lake Shore Road in Kendall	NY 237 / CR 70 at Lake Ontario State Parkway	
CR 85	1.00	1.61	CR 97 in Carlton	Lake Shore and Transit Roads	CR 90 on Carlton–Kendall town line	
CR 86	2.82	4.54	NY 104 / CR 41	Murdock Road in Ridgeway	Yates town line	
CR 87	4.04	6.50	Niagara County line	West Shelby Road in Shelby	NY 63	
CR 88	2.18	3.51	CR 2	Gaines Basin Road in Gaines	NY 104	
CR 89	0.30	0.48	NY 18 / NY 98	Oak Orchard Road in Carlton	NY 98 / CR 55	Former number; entire length overlapped with NY 98; highway transferred to state of New York on April 1, 1989
CR 90	2.00	3.22	CR 85	Lake Shore Road in Kendall	CR 84	
CR 91	0.64	1.03	CR 83	Hindsburg Road in Murray	CR 76	
CR 93	6.53	10.51	CR 63-1 in Yates	Lake Shore Road	CR 48 in Carlton	
CR 95	1.88	3.03	CR 32 / CR 51	Peter Smith Road in Kendall	CR 90	
CR 96	5.32	8.56	Genesee County line	Upper Holley Road in Clarendon	NY 31A	
CR 97	2.76	4.44	CR 37	Lake Shore Road in Carlton	CR 85	
CR 98	4.82	7.76	Genesee County line (becomes CR 24)	Oak Orchard Road in Barre	NY 98	Former routing of NY 98
CR 99	3.75	6.04	CR 5 / CR 25	West Barre Road in Barre	NY 98	Formerly part of NY 279
CR 101	1.56	2.51	NY 104 / NY 279	Gaines Road in Gaines	NY 279 / CR 102	Entire length overlaps with NY 279
CR 102	1.85	2.98	NY 279 / CR 31 / CR 103	Gaines Road in Carlton	NY 279 / CR 101	Entire length overlaps with NY 279
CR 103	0.40	0.64	NY 279 / CR 31 / CR 102	Waterport Road in Carlton	NY 279 / CR 49 / CR 104	Entire length overlaps with NY 279
CR 104	3.03	4.88	NY 279 / CR 49 / CR 103	Waterport Road in Carlton	NY 18	Entire length overlaps with NY 279
CR 106	0.70	1.13	NY 31A	West County House Road in Shelby	CR 20 / CR 36A	Formerly part of NY 31A

== See also ==
- County routes in New York
