= List of places in New York: K =

This list of current cities, towns, unincorporated communities, counties, and other recognized places in the U.S. state of New York also includes information on the number and names of counties in which the place lies, and its lower and upper zip code bounds, if applicable.

List of places in New York: A | B | C | D | E | F | G | H | I | J | K | L | M | N | O | P | Q | R | S | T | U | V | W | X | Y | Z

Name of place	Counties	Principal county	Lower zip code	Upper zip code
Kabob	1	Chautauqua County	14782	
Kaisertown	1	Orange County	12549	
Kallops Corners	1	Ulster County		
Kalurah	1	St. Lawrence County		
Kanona	1	Steuben County	14856	
Karlsfeld	1	Albany County		
Karner	1	Albany County		
Karrdale	1	Allegany County		
Karter	1	Jefferson County		
Kaser	1	Rockland County	10952	
Kasoag	1	Oswego County	13302	
Kast Bridge	1	Herkimer County		
Katonah	1	Westchester County	10536	
Katsbaan	1	Ulster County	12497	
Kattelville	1	Broome County	13901	
Kattskill Bay	1	Warren County	12844	
Kauneonga	1	Sullivan County		
Kauneonga Lake	1	Sullivan County	12749	
Kaydeross Park	1	Saratoga County	12866	
Kayuta	1	Oneida County		
Kayuta Lake	1	Oneida County	13338	
Keaches Corners	1	Chautauqua County		
Kecks Center	1	Fulton County	12095	
Keefers Corners	1	Albany County	12067	
Keene	1	Essex County	12942	
Keenes	1	St. Lawrence County		
Keene Valley	1	Essex County	12943	
Keeney	1	Cortland County		
Keepawa	1	Hamilton County		
Keese Mill	1	Franklin County		
Keeseville	2	Clinton County	12944	
Keeseville	2	Essex County	12944	
Keesler Corners	1	Montgomery County		
Kelleys	1	Schenectady County	12056	
Kellogg	1	Erie County		
Kellogg	1	St. Lawrence County		
Kelloggsville	1	Cayuga County	13118	
Kelly Corners	1	Delaware County	12455	
Kellys Corners	1	Delaware County		
Kellys Corners	1	Onondaga County		
Kelsey	1	Delaware County	13783	
Kendaia	1	Seneca County	14541	
Kendall	1	Orleans County	14476	
Kendall	1	Orleans County		
Kendall Mills	2	Monroe County	14470	
Kendall Mills	2	Orleans County	14470	
Kenilworth	1	Erie County	14223	
Kenilworth	1	Nassau County	11024	
Kenka Mills	1	Yates County		
Kenmore	1	Erie County	14217	
Kennedy	1	Chautauqua County	14747	
Kennedy Corner	1	Tompkins County	14850	
Kenoza Lake	1	Sullivan County	12750	
Kensico Cemetery	1	Westchester County		
Kensington	1	Erie County	14215	
Kensington	1	Kings County	11218	
Kensington	1	Nassau County	11021	
Kent	1	Orleans County	14477	
Kent	1	Putnam County		
Kent Cliffs	1	Putnam County	10512	
Kent Corners	1	Putnam County		
Kent Hills	1	Putnam County		
Kents Corners	1	St. Lawrence County	13630	
Kenwells	1	Hamilton County		
Kenwood	1	Albany County		
Kenwood	1	Madison County	13421	
Kenwood Estates	1	Putnam County	10512	
Kenyonville	1	Orleans County	14571	
Kerhonkson	1	Ulster County	12446	
Kerleys Corners	1	Dutchess County	12571	
Kernan	1	Oneida County	13503	
Kerry Siding	1	Delaware County		
Kerryville	1	Delaware County		
Ketchums Corner	1	Saratoga County	12170	
Ketchumville	1	Tioga County	13736	
Keuka	1	Steuben County	14837	
Keuka Park	1	Yates County	14478	
Kew Gardens	1	Queens County	11415	
Kiamesha Lake	1	Sullivan County	12751	
Kiantone	1	Chautauqua County	14701	
Kiantone	1	Chautauqua County		
Kidders	1	Seneca County	14847	
Kildare	1	Franklin County		
Killawog	1	Broome County	13794	
Kill Buck	1	Cattaraugus County	14748	
Kimball Corners	1	Saratoga County		
Kimball Mill	1	Lewis County		
Kimball Stand	1	Chautauqua County	14701	
Kinderhook	1	Columbia County	12106	
Kinderhook	1	Columbia County		
Kingdom	1	Herkimer County		
King Ferry	1	Cayuga County	13081	
King Ferry Station	1	Cayuga County		
Kings	1	Saratoga County		
Kingsboro	1	Fulton County	12078	
Kings Bridge	1	Bronx County	10463	
Kings Bridge Heights	1	Bronx County		
Kingsbury	1	Washington County	12839	
Kingsbury	1	Washington County		
Kings Ferry	1	Cayuga County	13081	
Kings Park	1	Suffolk County	11754	
Kings Point	1	Nassau County	11024	
Kings Settlement	1	Chenango County	13815	
Kings Station	1	Saratoga County	12831	
Kingston	1	Ulster County	12401	
Kingston	1	Ulster County		
Kingstown	1	Suffolk County		
Kingsway	1	Kings County	11229	
Kipps	1	Orange County	10924	
Kirk	1	Chenango County	13844	
Kirkland	1	Oneida County	13323	
Kirkland	1	Oneida County		
Kirkville	1	Onondaga County	13082	
Kirkwood	1	Broome County	13795	
Kirkwood	1	Broome County		
Kirkwood	1	Steuben County		
Kirkwood Center	1	Broome County		
Kirschnerville	1	Lewis County	13327	
Kiryas Joel	1	Orange County	10950	
Kisco Park	1	Westchester County	10549	
Kiskatom	1	Greene County	12414	
Kismet	1	Suffolk County	11706	
Kitchawan	1	Westchester County	10562	
Knapp Creek	1	Cattaraugus County	14749	
Knapps Corner	1	Dutchess County		
Knappville	1	Fulton County		
Knight Creek	1	Allegany County	14880	
Knights Eddy	1	Sullivan County	12780	
Knowelhurst	1	Warren County	12878	
Knowlesville	1	Orleans County		
Knowlesville	1	Orleans County	14479	
Knowsville	1	Jefferson County	13601	
Knox	1	Albany County	12107	
Knox	1	Albany County		
Knoxboro	1	Oneida County	13362	
Koenig's Point	1	Cayuga County	13021	
Kohlertown	1	Sullivan County	12743	
Komar Park	1	Saratoga County	12019	
Kortright	1	Delaware County	13739	
Kortright	1	Delaware County		
Kortright Center	1	Delaware County	13739	
Kortright Station	1	Delaware County		
Kossuth	1	Allegany County	14715	
Kosterville	1	Lewis County		
Kraus Landing	1	Oswego County		
Kringsbush	1	Fulton County	13452	
Kripplebush	1	Ulster County	12484	
Krum Corner	1	Tompkins County		
Krumville	1	Ulster County	12461	
Kuckville	1	Orleans County	14571	
Kuneytown	1	Seneca County		
Kyserike	1	Ulster County	12440	
Kysorville	1	Livingston County		
