= Oak Orchard =

Oak Orchard may refer to the following places in the United States:

In New York

- Oak Orchard Creek, a tributary of Lake Ontario
- Oak Orchard State Marine Park, located at the mouth of Oak Orchard Creek
- Oak Orchard Wildlife Management Area, located along Oak Orchard Creek
- Carlton, New York, a town in Orleans County, formerly called the Town of Oak Orchard
- Iroquois National Wildlife Refuge, formerly known as Oak Orchard National Wildlife Refuge

Elsewhere

- Oak Orchard, Delaware an unincorporated community
- Oak Orchard, Wisconsin, an unincorporated community
