= Albion Central School District =

School district in New York, United States

Location
- 324 East Avenue; Albion, New York 14411 Orleans County, New York United States of America

District information
- Type: Public
- Motto: Achievement, Character, and Success for Life
- Grades: K-12
- Superintendent: Mickey Edwards
- Budget: $38 million

Students and staff
- Students: abt. 1,900
- Teachers: abt. 200
- Athletic conference: New York State Public High School Athletic Association
- District mascot: Purple Eagle
- Colors: Purple and white

Other information
- Website: http://www.albionk12.org/

The Albion Central School District is a public school district in New York State that serves approximately 2,600 children in the village of Albion; most of the towns of Albion, Barre, Carlton, and Gaines; small parts of the towns of Kendall, Murray, and Ridgeway in Orleans County; and portions of the town of Elba in Genesee County, with an operating budget of $36 million.

The district motto is "Achievement, Character, and Success", is an alternate expansion of the district acronym "ACS."

The superintendent of schools is Mickey Edwards.

== Board of education ==
The Board of Education (BOE) consists of 9 members who serve overlapping 5-year terms. Elections are held each May for board members and to vote on the School District Budget.

Current board members (October 2023) are:

- Wayne Wadhams - President ('27)
- Linda Weller - Vice President ('29)
- Porsche Taylor ('28)
- John Kast ('25)
- Christopher Kinter ('25)
- Kurt Schmitt ('26)
- Kelly Kirby ('29)
- Ocie Bennett, Jr. ('27)
- Trellis Pore ('26)

== Schools ==
=== Ronald L. Sodoma Elementary School (PreK-5) ===
- Angela Conway — principal
- Kevin Beaumont — vice-principal

=== Carl I. Bergerson Middle School (6-8) ===
- Brad Pritchard — principal

=== Charles C. D'Amico High School (9-12) ===
- Jennifer Ashbery — principal (July 1, 2019)
- Tara DeVay — assistant principal

== Rules ==
The Albion District has a strict code system called the "Code of Conduct". Many consequences can take place if these rules are broken. WEBB (We Expect Better Behavior), Detention (which can last until 4:15 P.M) in the middle school, trip to principals, suspension (or possibly be expelled), CR (Correction Room) for the high school. The elementary school does not have detention. WEBB is a common form of punishment in the elementary school after being sent to the office. In the middle school, WEBB is used on its own, currently being run by Mike Jones.

== Time ==
Carl I. Bergerson Middle School & Charles C. D'Amico High School: Starts at 7:45 ET (6:45 CT) and ends at 2:22 ET (1:22 CT) Ronald L. Sodoma Elementary School: Starts at 9:00 ET (8:00 CT) and ends at 3:10 ET (2:10 CT)

== Bells ==
The middle and high schools have different bell schedules for changing classes. However, the elementary school does not have these bells. Instead they have teachers guide the students to their classes.

== Technology ==
Albion Central Schools have an advanced computer network. The three school buildings are interconnected on a district-wide fiber-optic network. They provide all middle and high school students with touchscreen Acer Chromebooks.
