= Fancher, New York =

Fancher is a hamlet in the town of Murray in Orleans County, New York, United States. The ZIP Code for Fancher is 14452. It is named after Edward Fernando Fancher, a native of Durham in Greene County, New York. Fancher was a minister and farmer who first settled in Carlton and then in Gaines before relocating to Murray. In 1887 he partnered with Charles F. Gwynne in the quarrying of Medina Sandstone. The following year he opened his own quarry on land purchased near Hulberton. After the establishment of a post office, the small settlement was named in Fancher's honor due to the massive quantity of sandstone shipped from the location by way of the Erie Canal and New York Central Railroad. Fancher served as the general manager of the Orleans County Quarry Company and was one of the more prominent quarry owners in Orleans County.
