= Kendall Central School District =

School district in New York, United States

Location
- Kendall, New York United States

District information
- Type: Public
- Motto: Respect, Responsibility, Caring
- Grades: K-12
- Superintendent: Nicolas Picardo
- School board: Lisa Levett (president); Rachel Fisken (vice president); Chaley Swift (trustee); David Warren (trustee); David Hardenbrook (trustee); Heather Pyke (BOCES representative)
- Schools: 2
- Budget: $19,822,921

Students and staff
- Students: 684
- Teachers: 86
- Staff: 58
- Athletic conference: Section V
- District mascot: Eagle
- Colors: Blue and white

Other information
- Website: www.kendallschools.org

The Kendall Central School District is a public school district in New York State that serves approximately 684 students in the town of Kendall and portions of the towns of Carlton, Holley and Murray in Orleans County; and portions of the towns of Clarkson and Hamlin in Monroe County, with over 150 employees and an operating budget of $14 million (~$0 per student).

The average class size is about 55 students and the student-teacher ratio is 16:1 (elementary), 23:1 (middle-high school). The smallest class size in school history was the Physics class during the 2022 school year, with one student.

Nicolas Picardo is the superintendent of schools. He was formerly the athletic director at the Kendall Central School District.

== Board of education ==
The Board of Education (BOE) consists of six members who serve rotating five-year terms. Elections are held each May for board members to vote on the school district budget.

- Nadine Hanlon – president
- Lisa Levett – vice president
- Jason ReQua – trustee
- Chaley Swift – trustee
- Charles Patt – trustee
- Connie Rockow – BOCES representative

=== Former superintendents ===
- Harold R. Osbourne
- David J. Doyle
- Harlow D. Fisher
- Dr. Michael C. O'Laughlin, 2000–2007 (principal – Kendall Junior/Senior High School, named superintendent of Monroe II – Orleans BOCES, died in 2010)
- Julie Christensen

== Kendall Junior/Senior High School ==
Kendall Junior/Senior High School

Location
- 16887 Roosevelt Hwy; Kendall, Orleans, New York 14476; United States; 43.3192°N 78.0252°W

Information
- Type: Public school
- Motto: One Family, One School, One Community
- Status: Operational
- School district: Kendall Central School District
- Superintendent: Nicolas Picardo
- Principal: Melissa Strelick
- Grades: 7-12
- Age range: 12-18
- Average class size: 55
- Language: English
- Hours in school day: 7
- Campus size: c. 130,444 sq ft (12,118.6 m^{2})
- Colors: Blue and white
- Sports: Basketball, tennis, baseball, softball, volleyball, soccer, golf, track, cross-country
- Mascot: Eagle
- Rival: Holley Hawks
- Publication: Jostens
- Newspaper: Kendall Chronicle
- Website: www.kendallschools.org/jrsrhigh.cfm?subpage=130

David J. Doyle Kendall Junior/Senior High School is located at 16887 Roosevelt Highway and serves grades 7–12. The current principal is Melissa Strelick, and the current assistant principal and athletic director is Mark Driesel. Approximately in 2020–2021 52 students at 16% enrolled as seventh graders, 48 students at 14% registered as eighth graders, 63 students at 19% enrolled as freshmen, 59 students at 18% enrolled as sophomores, 63 students at 19% enrolled as juniors, and 49 students at 15% enrolled as seniors.

=== Former principals ===
Previous assignment and reason for departure denoted in parentheses

- Harold R. Osbourne
- David Doyle (unknown, named superintendent of Kendall Central School)
- Frank W. Clow
- Michael C. O'Laughlin, 1986–2000 (administrative assistant – Kendall Central School, named superintendent of Kendall Central School District)
- Michael J. Richter, 2000–2002 (assistant principal – Twelve Corners Middle School, named principal of Waterloo High School)
- Scott Mac Donnell, 2002–2003 (interim)
- Ty E. Zinkiewich, 2003–2005 (assistant principal – Odyssey Academy, named Principal of Spencerport High School)
- Carol D'Agostino, 2005–2023

== Kendall Elementary School ==
Kendall Elementary School

Location
- 1932 Kendall Rd; Kendall, Orleans, New York 14476; United States; 43.3221°N 78.0369°W

Information
- Type: Public school
- Motto: One Family, One School, One Community
- Status: Operational
- School district: Kendall Central School District
- Superintendent: Nicolas Picardo
- Principal: Kevin Watson
- Grades: K-6
- Age range: 6-12
- Language: English
- Hours in school day: 6
- Campus size: c. 149,830 sq ft (13,920 m^{2})
- Campus type: Public
- Colors: Blue and white
- Mascot: Eagle
- Nickname: The Eagles
- Rival: Holley Hawks
- Newspaper: Kendall Chronicle
- Website: www.kendallschools.org/KendallElementary.cfm?subpage=132

Kendall Elementary School is located at 1932 Kendall Road and serves grades K through 6. The current principal is Kevin Watson.

=== Former principals ===
Previous assignment and reason for departure denoted in parentheses

- Glenn Stofka (unknown, retired)
- Richard L. Suhr (unknown, retired)
- Scott A. Wright, 2001–2012 (unknown, retired)
- Sharon Smith, 2012–2019 (unknown, retired)
- Heather Eysaman, 2019–2021 (unknown, retired)
