= Waterport Reservoir =

- Location within New York Location within the United States
- Location: Orleans County, New York
- Coordinates: 43°19′27″N 78°14′29″W
- Type: Reservoir
- Primary inflows: Oak Orchard River
- Primary outflows: Oak Orchard River
- Basin countries: United States
- Surface area: 338 acres (1.37 km^{2})
- Average depth: 12 ft (3.7 m)
- Max. depth: 65 ft (20 m)
- Shore length^{1}: 11.9 mi (19.2 km)
- Surface elevation: 331 ft (101 m)
- Islands: 2
- Settlements: Waterport, New York
- ^{1} Shore length is not a well-defined measure.

Waterport Reservoir is a reservoir located by Waterport, New York. Fish species present in the lake are brown trout, lake trout, atlantic salmon, coho salmon, chinook salmon, steelhead trout, and walleye. There is a beach launch off Waterport Road on the northeast shore.
