= John G. Sawyer =

American politician (1825-1898)

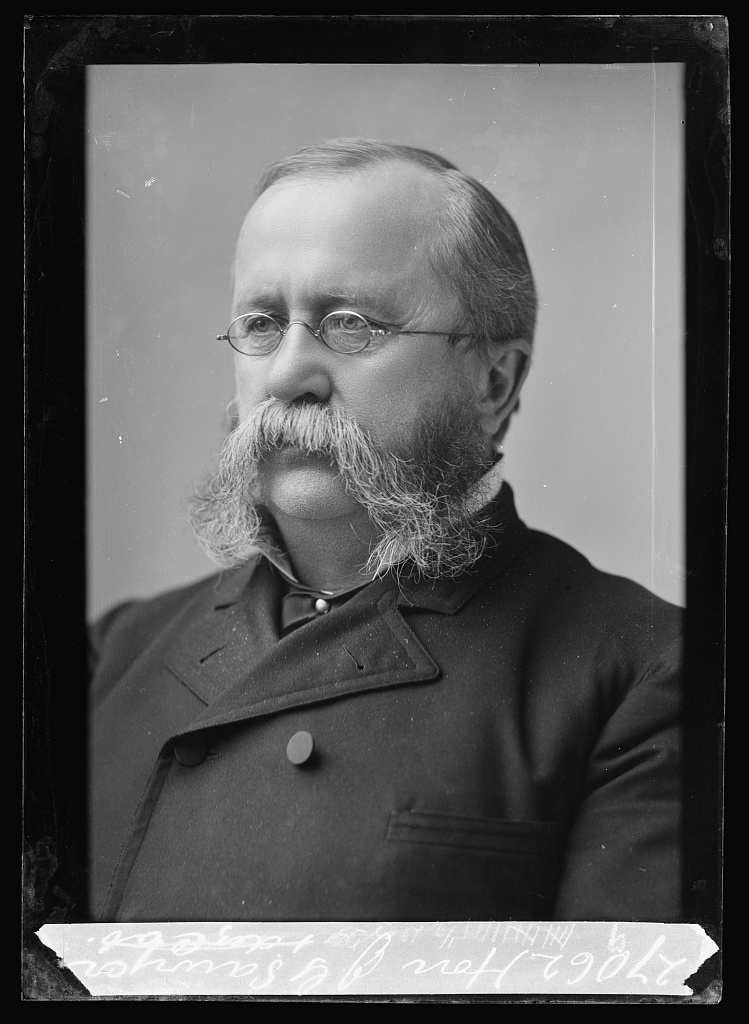
- John Gilbert Sawyer, Congressman from New York

Member of the U.S. House of Representatives from New York's 30th district
- In office March 4, 1885 - March 3, 1891
- Preceded by: Robert S. Stevens
- Succeeded by: James Wolcott Wadsworth

Personal details
- Born: June 5, 1825 Brandon, Vermont, U.S.
- Died: September 5, 1898 (aged 73) Albion, New York
- Party: Whig; Republican
- Spouse: Eliza A. Shaw

John Gilbert Sawyer (June 5, 1825 – September 5, 1898) was a U.S. representative from New York.

== Background ==
Born in Brandon, Vermont on June 5, 1825, Sawyer was the eldest of seven children born to John F. and Mary J. Sawyer. His father relocated the family to Knowlesville, New York in 1831 where Sawyer attended the common schools at Shelby, New York and at Millville Academy (New York). In order to pursue a collegiate education, he relocated to Kentucky and later to Arkansas, where he taught in local one-room schoolhouses to earn enough money for his studies. In 1846, Sawyer returned to Knowlesville and relocated to Albion, New York the following year. There he studied law with Curtis & Stone before finishing with Benjamin L. Bessac. Before completing his law studies, Sawyer was elected to the position of superintendent of public schools for Orleans County, New York in 1848.

== Political career ==
In 1851 Sawyer was elected as a justice of the peace and served in that position for nearly 5 years. In 1855, he formed a partnership with Sanford E. Church. In 1862 he was elected as Orleans County District Attorney and in 1863 as county judge. As a strong supporter of education, Sawyer was appointed in 1876 to the original Board of Education for the Albion Union Free School.

Sawyer was elected to the U.S. House of Representatives as a Republican in 1884, serving three consecutive terms to the Forty-ninth, Fiftieth, and Fifty-first Congresses (March 4, 1885 – March 3, 1891). A staunch Republican, he originally aligned with the Whigs and assisted in organizing the Republican party in Orleans County.

== Death and legacy ==
Upon his return to Albion in 1891, he resumed the practice of his profession and died there September 5, 1898. He was interred in Mount Albion Cemetery.

The hamlet of Sawyer in Orleans County was named in honor of John G. Sawyer.

== Sources ==
U.S. House of Representatives
Preceded by Robert S. Stevens	Member of the U.S. House of Representatives from New York's 31st congressional district 1885–1891	Succeeded by James Wolcott Wadsworth
