= Brockville (disambiguation) =

Brockville is a Canadian city.

Brockville may also refer to:

- Brockville (federal electoral district), a defunct Canadian federal electoral district
- Brockville (provincial electoral district), a defunct Ontario provincial electoral district
- Brockville, New Zealand, a suburb of Dunedin
- Brockville, New York, a hamlet in the United States
- HMCS Brockville (J270), a Royal Canadian Navy minesweeper

== See also ==
- Brockville Park, the former stadium of Falkirk F.C., in Scotland
