= Kent, Orleans County, New York =

Kent, New York
- Hamlet
- Location within New York Location within the United States
- Coordinates: 43°19′40″N 78°08′07″W
- Country: United States
- State: New York
- County: Orleans
- Elevation: 341 ft (104 m)
- Time zone: UTC-5 (Eastern (EST))
  - Summer (DST): UTC-4 (EDT)
- ZIP code: 14477
- Area code: 585
- GNIS feature ID: 954530

Kent is a hamlet in the town of Carlton within Orleans County, New York, United States. The community is 6.4 miles (10.3 km) north-northeast of Albion. Kent has a post office with ZIP code 14477, which opened on March 30, 1835.
