= Waterport, New York =

- Hamlet
- Location within New York Location within the United States
- Coordinates: 43°19′01″N 78°15′05″W
- Country: United States
- State: New York
- County: Orleans
- Elevation: 351 ft (107 m)
- Time zone: UTC-5 (Eastern (EST))
  - Summer (DST): UTC-4 (EDT)
- ZIP code: 14571
- Area code: 585
- GNIS feature ID: 968906

Waterport is a hamlet in Orleans County, New York, United States. The community is located along Oak Orchard Creek and New York State Route 279, 5.7 miles (9.2 km) north-northwest of Albion. Waterport has a post office with ZIP code 14571.
