= New York State Route 279 =

State highway in Orleans County, New York, US

New York State Route 279
- Map of northern Orleans County with NY 279 highlighted in red

Route information
- Maintained by NYSDOT and Orleans County
- Length: 8.76 mi (14.10 km)
- History: Designated NY 209 in 1930; renumbered to NY 279 in April 1935

Major junctions
- South end: NY 98 in Gaines
- North end: NY 18 in Carlton

Location
- Country: United States
- State: New York
- Counties: Orleans

Highway system
- New York Highways; Interstate; US; State; Reference; Parkways
← NY 278	→ NY 280

New York State Route 279 (NY 279) is a north–south state highway in Orleans County, New York, in the United States. The southern terminus of the route is at an intersection with NY 98 north of the village of Albion in the town of Gaines. Its northern terminus is at a junction with NY 18 in Carlton near where NY 18 meets the western end of the Lake Ontario State Parkway. The entirety of NY 279 north of NY 104 is maintained by Orleans County; south of NY 104, the route is maintained by the New York State Department of Transportation. NY 279 is a rural connector highway that serves only one community, the hamlet of Waterport on the banks of Oak Orchard Creek in Carlton.

The origins of NY 279 date back to the 1930 renumbering of state highways in New York when all of modern NY 279 was designated as part of New York State Route 209, which continued south through Albion and west through West Barre to Shelby. NY 209 was cut back to West Barre c. 1931 and renumbered to NY 279 in April 1935 to eliminate numerical duplication with U.S. Route 209, which was extended into New York at that time. NY 279 was truncated to its current southern terminus north of Albion in the early 1950s. NY 98, which originally followed Oak Orchard Road through Barre, was realigned to follow the easternmost segment of NY 279's former routing on Quaker Hill Road.

== Route description ==
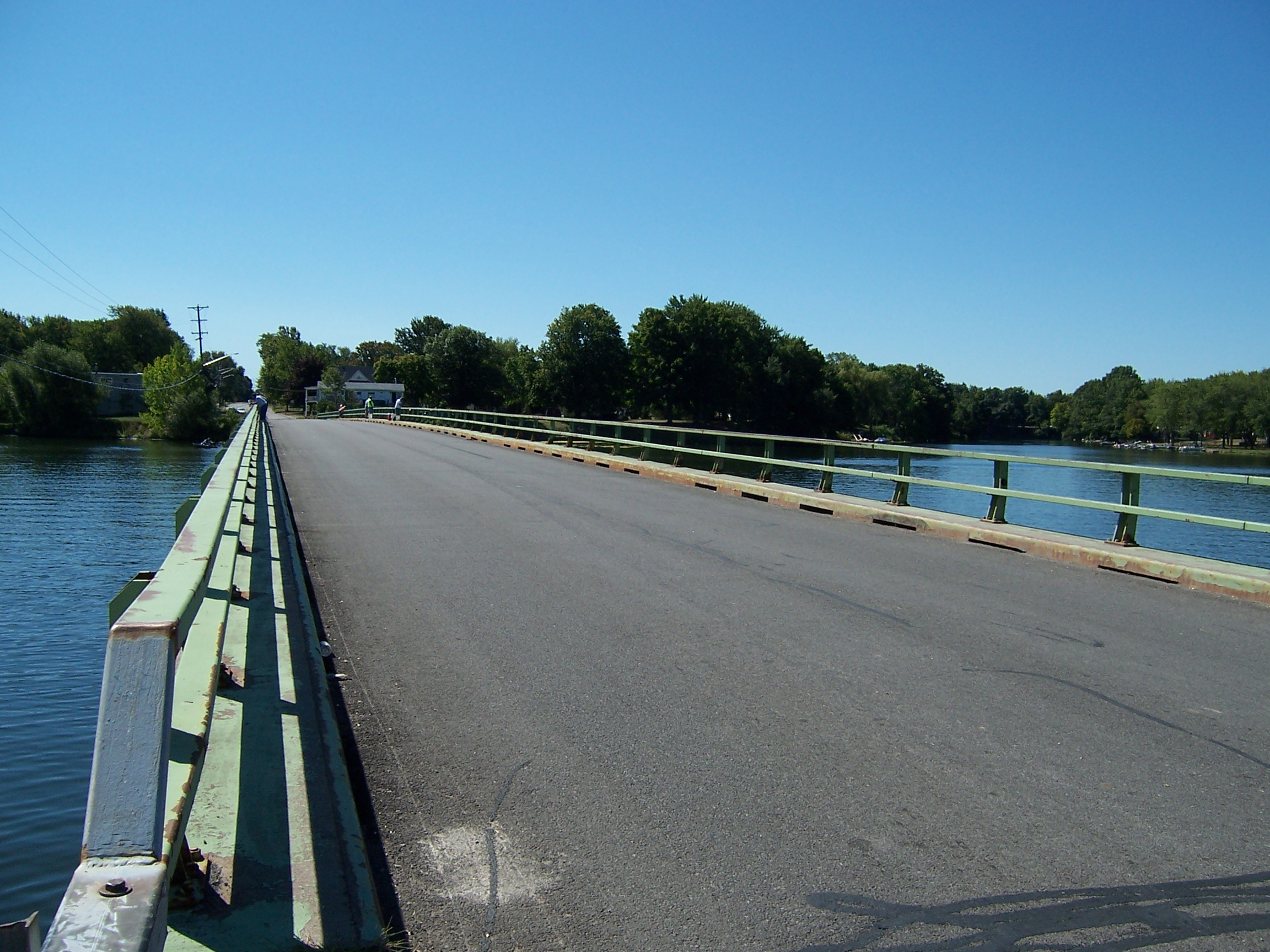
NY 279 crossing the Oak Orchard River, with Waterport in the background

NY 279 begins at NY 98 just north of the village of Albion at the hamlet of Five Corners. The route heads northwest as Gaines Road through the town of Gaines to the hamlet of the same name, where it intersects NY 104 (Ridge Road). Here, maintenance of the route shifts from the New York State Department of Transportation to Orleans County. NY 279 continues on, now concurrent with the unsigned County Route 101, into the town of Carlton, where NY 279's county route designation becomes CR 102 upon crossing the Gaines–Carlton town line.

In Carlton, NY 279 deviates from its northwesterly routing and heads due west to serve the hamlet of Waterport situated on the Oak Orchard River. It intersects Eagle Harbor–Waterport Road (CR 31) south of the community, then turns north toward the creek, becoming overlapped with CR 103 at CR 31. NY 279 heads through Waterport and crosses the river at Waterport Pond (also known as Lake Alice), a widewaters formed by a dam along Oak Orchard River northeast of Waterport. On the northern bank of the pond, NY 279 meets Oak Orchard River Road (CR 49). The CR 103 designation ends here and is replaced with CR 104 as NY 279 turns eastward onto Waterport Road.

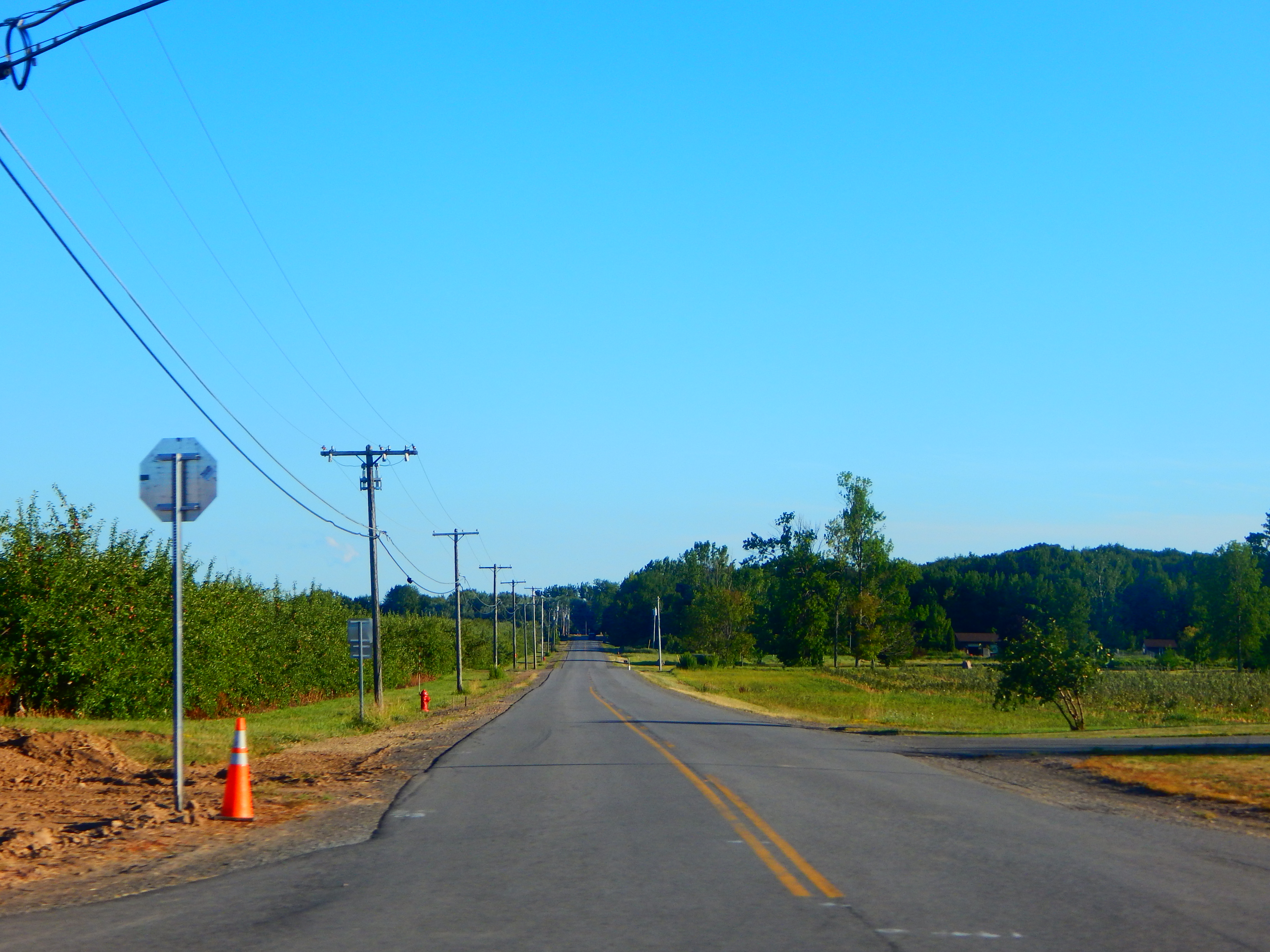
NY 279 south from NY 18 in Carlton

The route briefly follows the northern bank of the river, then veers north to serve Waterport Station, a small community centered around the former grade crossing between NY 279 and the Hojack Line. Past Waterport Station, NY 279 continues north through forested areas and cultivated fields to its northern terminus at a junction with NY 18 near the Lake Ontario shoreline and south of Lakeside Beach State Park. Just east of the junction, NY 18 intersects the western end of the Lake Ontario State Parkway.

== History ==
All of modern NY 279 was originally designated as part of NY 209, a route assigned as part of the 1930 renumbering of state highways in New York. NY 209 began at NY 19 (now NY 63) in Shelby and followed Fletcher Chapel, Hemlock Ridge, and West Barre Roads to Quaker Hill Road, where it turned north to meet NY 98 at Oak Orchard Road. The two routes then embarked on an overlap through Albion to Gaines Road, at which point NY 209 split off to the northwest toward the hamlet of Waterport. NY 209 was truncated eastward to West Barre c. 1931. When U.S. Route 209 was extended into New York c. 1935, NY 209 was renumbered to NY 279 to eliminate numerical duplication with the new U.S. Highway.

In the early 1950s, NY 279 was cut back to its junction with NY 98 north of Albion. At the same time, NY 98 was realigned in Barre to use NY 279's former routing along Quaker Hill Road. The shift was part of a larger realignment of NY 98 through the towns of Barre and Elba. The remainder of NY 279's former routing to West Barre is now maintained by Orleans County as County Route 99.

== Major intersections ==
The entire route is in Orleans County.

Location	mi	km	Destinations	Notes
Gaines	0.00	0.00	NY 98 (Oak Orchard Road)	Southern terminus; hamlet of Five Corners
Gaines	1.91	3.07	NY 104 (Ridge Road West)	Hamlet of Gaines
Carlton	8.76	14.10	NY 18 (Roosevelt Highway)	Northern terminus
1.000 mi = 1.609 km; 1.000 km = 0.621 mi

== See also ==
- List of county routes in Orleans County, New York
