= Kenyonville, New York =

- Hamlet
- Location within New York Location within the United States
- Coordinates: 43°18′40″N 78°16′50″W
- Country: United States
- State: New York
- County: Orleans
- Elevation: 351 ft (107 m)

Kenyonville is a hamlet in Orleans County, New York, United States. It is named after Barber Kenyon, a native of East Greenwich in Washington County, who first settled in that location, erecting a grist mill and saw mill. The community is located along the Oak Orchard Creek, 2.3 miles (3.7 km) north of the historic Ridge Road. In 1894, the community consisted of a post office, store, blacksmith shop, wagon shop, grist mill, saw mill, and a Methodist church.
