= Hulberton, New York =

Hamlet in Murray, New York, U.S.

Coordinates: 43°15′11″N 78°03′57″W

Hulberton is a hamlet in the town of Murray in Orleans County, New York, United States. It is named after Isaac Henry Scott Hulbert, a native of Pittsfield in Berkshire County, Massachusetts. Arriving first at Sandy Creek in 1824, Hulbert soon relocated the following year to the nearby hamlet of Scio. The location prospered along the Erie Canal where Hulbert engaged in the produce business. On March 6, 1830 he was selected at chairman of the building committee for the Methodist Episcopal Church and was a long-time Justice of the Peace.

When the community determined the need for a local post office, the nearest being located at the hamlet of Sandy Creek, Hulbert was appointed to the position of post master. This post office was established in 1835. The name of the hamlet was changed to Hulberton in honor of Isaac Hulbert in part because of Hulbert's role as post master, but also because the town of Scio in Allegany County, New York predated the location.
