= Brockville, New York =

- Hamlet
- Location within New York Location within the United States
- Coordinates: 43°15′40″N 78°05′26″W
- Country: United States
- State: New York
- County: Orleans
- Elevation: 453 ft (138 m)

Brockville is a hamlet in the town of Murray in Orleans County, New York, United States. It is named after Heil Brockway, a native of Clinton in Middlesex County, Connecticut, United States. The small settlement is located approximately 0.75 miles east of Hindsburg and was largely settled due to the opening of Medina Sandstone quarries in that vicinity.
