= Kuckville, New York =

Coordinates: 43°21′38″N 78°15′56″W

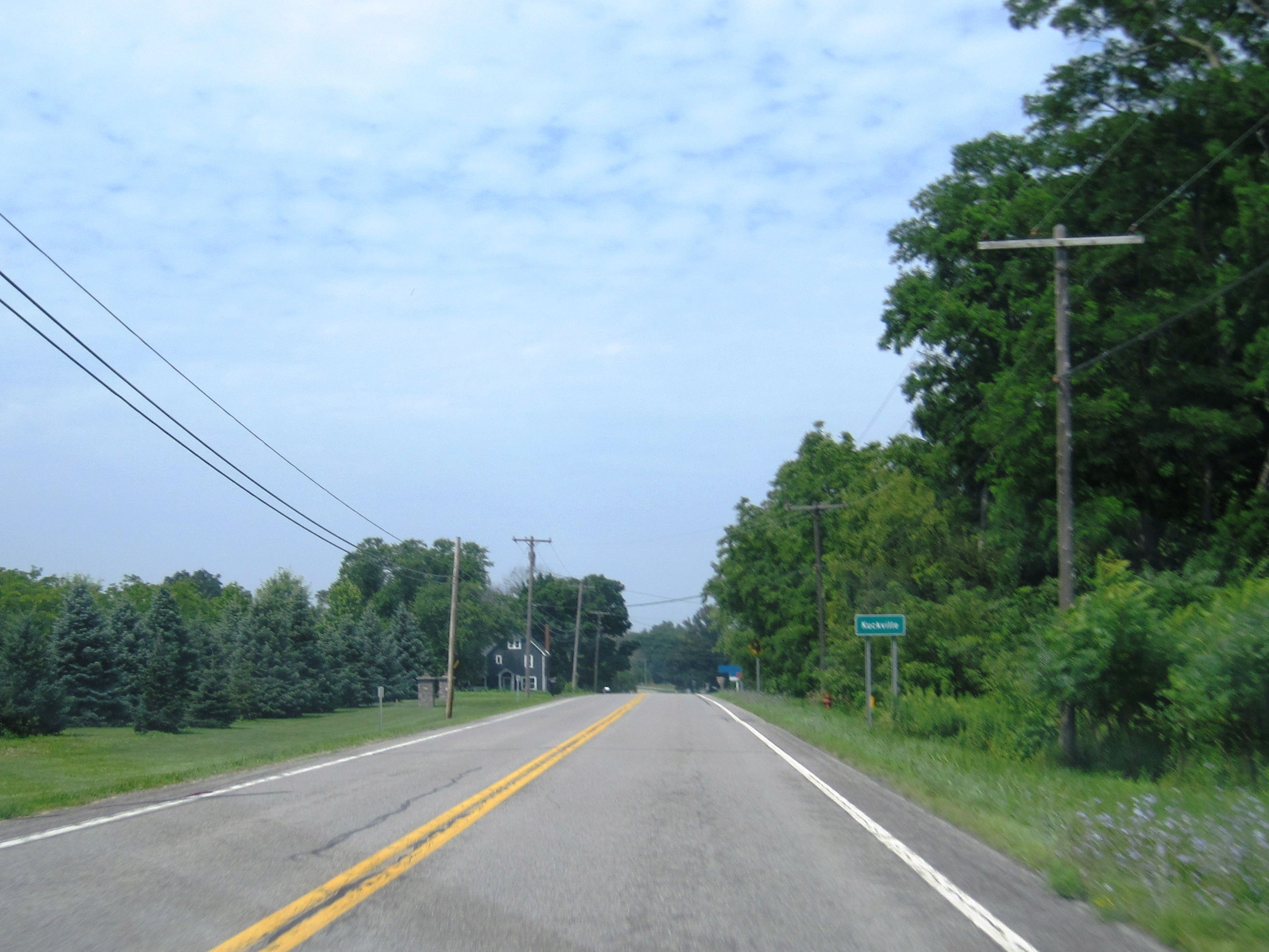
Entering Kuckville on westbound NY 18

Kuckville is a hamlet in the town of Carlton in Orleans County, New York, United States. It is named after Rev. George Kuck, an immigrant from Toronto, Ontario, Canada who settled in near the shore of Lake Ontario in 1815. Kuck established the first grocery store, north of the Ridge Road in Orleans County in 1816 and was a minister in the Methodist Episcopal Church.
