= Sawyer, Orleans County, New York =

Hamlet in New York, United States

Coordinates: 43°20′22″N 78°9′37″W

Sawyer is a hamlet in the town of Carlton, Orleans County, New York, United States. It is named after John G. Sawyer, a congressman from New York. The settlement was previously named "Curtis's Corners" after John Curtis, a native of New Hampshire, who settled on lot 1, section 5 at Carlton in Orleans County. In 1894 the hamlet contained a store, post office, and blacksmith shop.
