= Oak Orchard State Marine Park =

State park in Orleans County, New York, United States

- Location within New York
- Type: State park
- Location: NY Route 18; Carlton, New York
- Nearest city: Albion, New York
- Coordinates: 43°22′05″N 78°12′14″W
- Area: 81 acres (0.33 km^{2})
- Operator: New York State Office of Parks, Recreation and Historic Preservation
- Visitors: 9,259 (in 2014)
- Open: All year
- Website: Oak Orchard State Marine Park

Oak Orchard State Marine Park is an 81-acre (0.33 km^{2}) state park located at the mouth of Oak Orchard Creek at Lake Ontario in the Town of Carlton in Orleans County, New York, United States. The park can be accessed from NY Route 18 and the Lake Ontario State Parkway. The park is a few miles east of Lakeside Beach State Park.

The park offers picnic tables, a boat launch, and fishing.

== See also ==
- List of New York state parks
