= Oak Orchard, Wisconsin =

- Unincorporated community
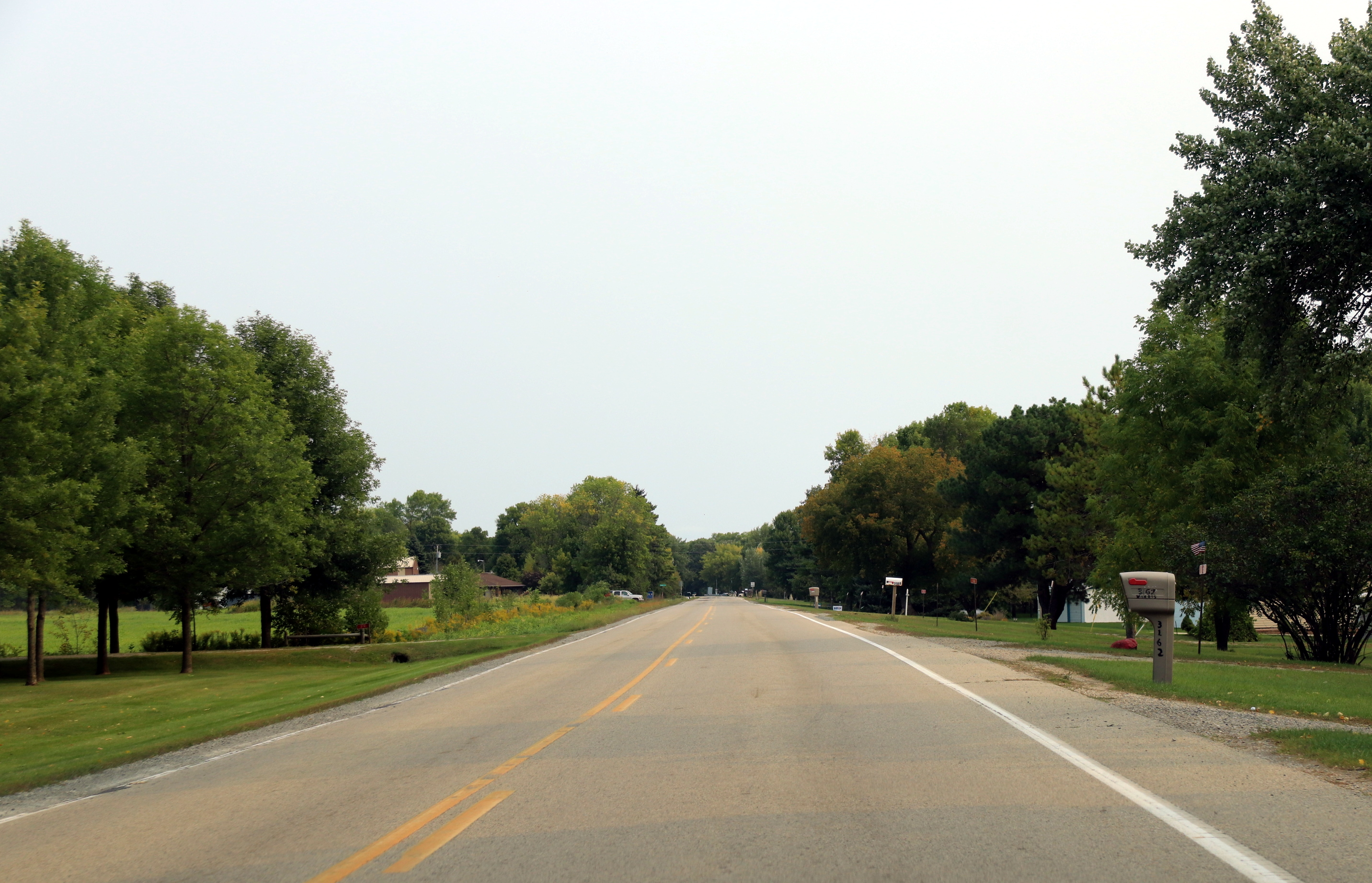
- Housing in Oak Orchard

- Location within Wisconsin Location within the United States
- Coordinates: 44°46′53″N 87°55′33″W
- Country: United States
- State: Wisconsin
- County: Oconto
- Elevation: 584 ft (178 m)
- Time zone: UTC-6 (Central (CST))
  - Summer (DST): UTC-5 (CDT)
- Area code: 920
- GNIS feature ID: 1570668

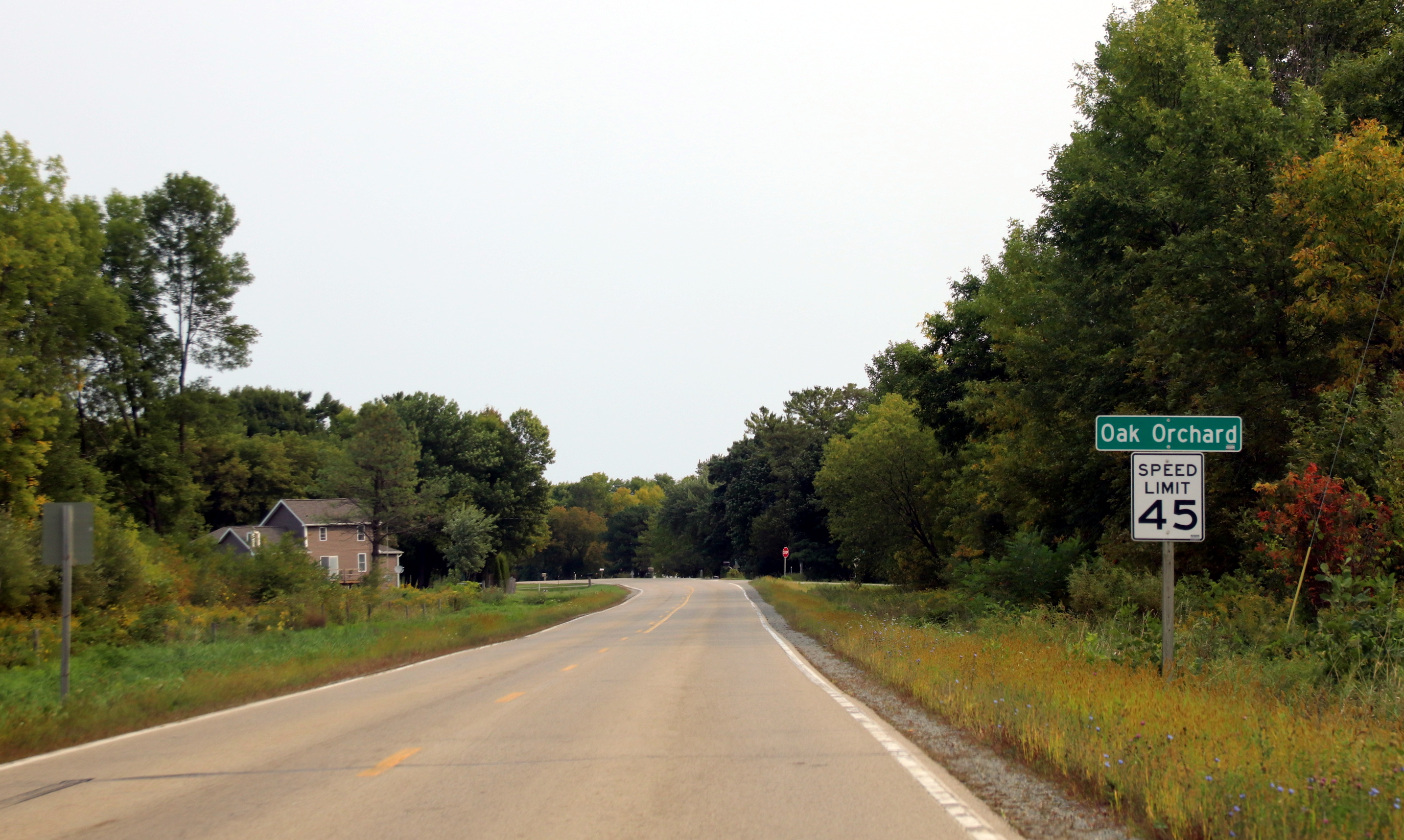
Sign for Oak Orchard

Oak Orchard is an unincorporated community located in the town of Pensaukee, Oconto County, Wisconsin, United States. The first settlers of the community established a small general store that was often used as a "stopping off place" for travelers. The community also had a school. After the closing of the school and store, the community has become a rural sleepy roadside community.
