= New York State Route 387 =

State highway in Orleans County, New York, US

New York State Route 387
- Fancher Road
- Map of Orleans County in western New York with NY 387 highlighted in red

Route information
- Maintained by NYSDOT
- Length: 2.95 mi (4.75 km)
- Existed: 1930–present

Major junctions
- South end: NY 31 in Murray
- North end: NY 104 in Murray

Location
- Country: United States
- State: New York
- Counties: Orleans

Highway system
- New York Highways; Interstate; US; State; Reference; Parkways
← NY 386	→ I-390

New York State Route 387 (NY 387) is a 2.95-mile (4.75 km) state highway located within the town of Murray in Orleans County, New York, in the United States. It serves as a north–south connector between NY 31 in the hamlet of Fancher and NY 104 (Ridge Road) midway between the hamlets of East Gaines and Murray. In between, NY 387 crosses the Erie Canal and passes through the community of Brockville. The route was assigned to its current alignment as part of the 1930 renumbering of state highways in New York.

== Route description ==
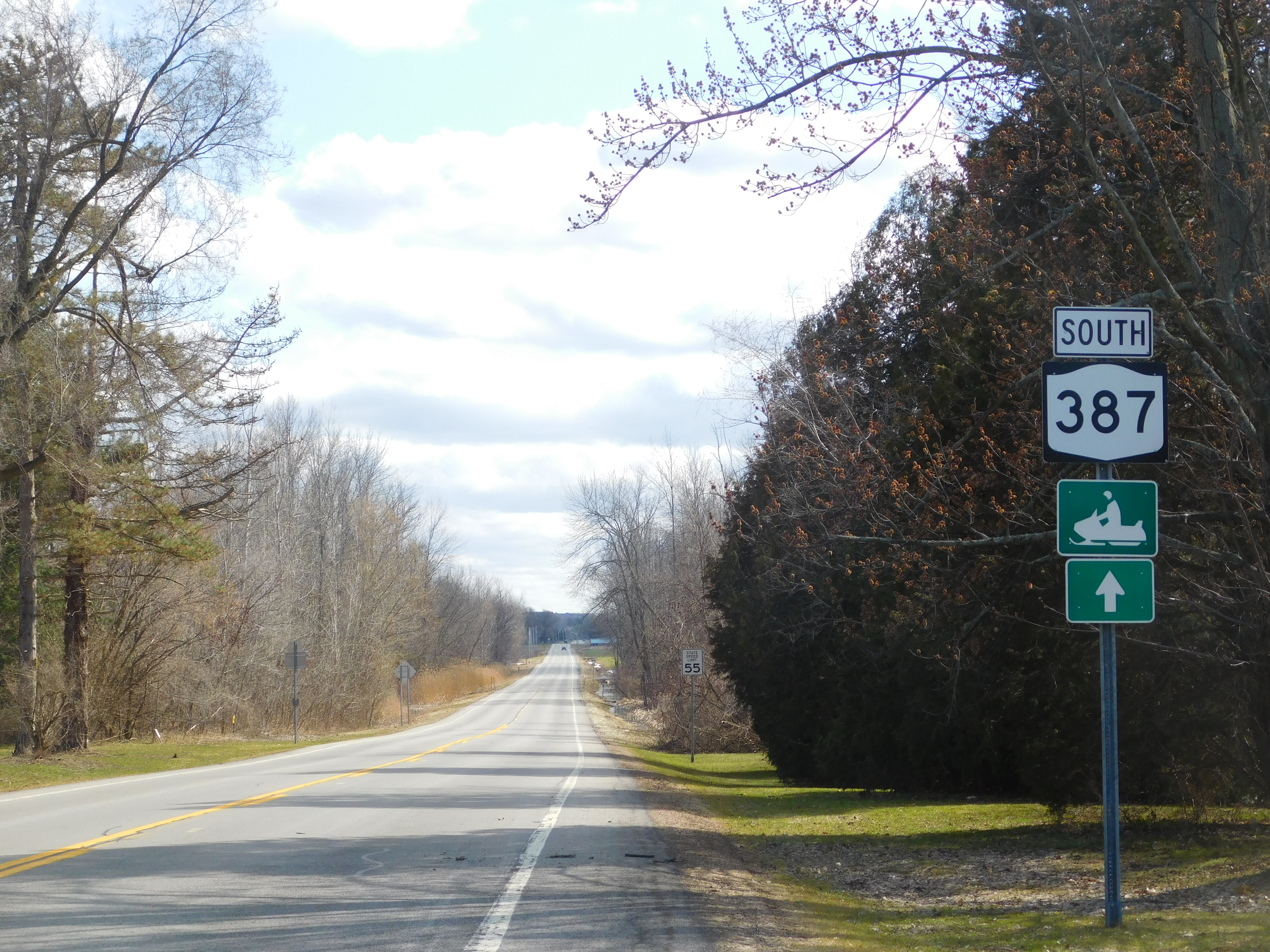
NY 387 southbound in Murray

NY 387 begins at a T-intersection with NY 31 in Fancher, a small hamlet located on the Falls Road Railroad in the town of Murray. While NY 31 heads south and west from the junction, NY 387 heads to the north on Fancher Road, crossing the Falls Road Railroad and passing by a small pocket of homes before exiting the hamlet and entering an open, rural area. About 0.5 miles (0.8 km) from Fancher, the route crosses over the Erie Canal just south of another hamlet known as Brockville. NY 387 runs north–south through the community and across the west branch of Sandy Creek into another undeveloped area, where NY 387 quietly ends 1.5 miles (2.4 km) later at an isolated junction with NY 104 (Ridge Road).

== History ==
The highway that is now NY 387 became a state highway on May 1, 1917, when the state of New York assumed ownership of the road following the completion of a $44,848.35 project (equivalent to $1,127,033 in 2025) to bring the highway up to state highway standards. It was subsequently designated, but not signed, as State Highway 580 (SH 580). The road served as a north–south connector between two major east–west highways: the Theodore Roosevelt International Highway (now NY 31) to the south and Ridge Road (NY 104) to the north. While both of those roads had posted route numbers as early as 1926, SH 580 was not assigned a posted number until the 1930 renumbering of state highways in New York when it was designated as NY 387.

== Major intersections ==
The entire route is in Murray, Orleans County.

mi	km	Destinations	Notes
0.00	0.00	NY 31	Southern terminus; hamlet of Fancher
2.95	4.75	NY 104	Northern terminus
1.000 mi = 1.609 km; 1.000 km = 0.621 mi
