= Barre, New York =

- Town
- Location in Orleans County and the state of New York.

- Location of New York in the United States
- Coordinates: 43°10′48″N 78°12′32″W
- Country: United States
- State: New York
- County: Orleans

Area
  - Total: 55.05 sq mi (142.58 km^{2})
  - Land: 55.04 sq mi (142.55 km^{2})
  - Water: 0.012 sq mi (0.03 km^{2})
- Elevation: 660 ft (200 m)

Population (2010)
  - Total: 2,025
  - Estimate (2016): 1,921
  - Density: 34.9/sq mi (13.48/km^{2})
- Time zone: UTC-5 (Eastern (EST))
  - Summer (DST): UTC-4 (EDT)
- FIPS code: 36-04572
- GNIS feature ID: 0978710

Barre is a town in Orleans County, New York, United States. The population was 2,025 at the 2010 census. The town is named after Barre, Massachusetts.

The Town of Barre is on the southern boundary of the county.

== History ==
The Town of Barre /ˈbæri/ was founded in 1818 from part of the Town of Gaines. The town was named after the birthplace of an early settler.

The Benjamin Franklin Gates House was listed on the National Register of Historic Places in 2009.

== Geography ==
According to the United States Census Bureau, the town has a total area of 55.1 square miles (143 km^{2}), of which 55.1 square miles (143 km^{2}) is land and 0.02% is water.

The southern boundary is shared with the Towns of Elba and Oakfield in Genesee County.

New York State Route 98 is a major roadway that runs north-south through the town and intersects New York State Route 31A near the northern boundary.

== Government ==
The incumbent Town Supervisor is Sean Pogue (R).

== Demographics ==
Historical population
| Census | Pop. | Note | %± |
|---|---|---|---|
| 1820 | 1,767 | | — |
| 1830 | 4,801 | | 171.7% |
| 1840 | 5,539 | | 15.4% |
| 1850 | 6,437 | | 16.2% |
| 1860 | 7,228 | | 12.3% |
| 1870 | 6,756 | | −6.5% |
| 1880 | 2,325 | | −65.6% |
| 1890 | 2,154 | | −7.4% |
| 1900 | 1,937 | | −10.1% |
| 1910 | 1,812 | | −6.5% |
| 1920 | 1,622 | | −10.5% |
| 1930 | 1,686 | | 3.9% |
| 1940 | 1,545 | | −8.4% |
| 1950 | 1,623 | | 5.0% |
| 1960 | 1,922 | | 18.4% |
| 1970 | 2,135 | | 11.1% |
| 1980 | 2,164 | | 1.4% |
| 1990 | 2,093 | | −3.3% |
| 2000 | 2,124 | | 1.5% |
| 2010 | 2,025 | | −4.7% |
| 2016 (est.) | 1,921 | | −5.1% |
U.S. Decennial Census

As of the census of 2000, there were 2,124 people, 739 households, and 582 families residing in the town. The population density was 38.6 inhabitants per square mile (14.9/km^{2}). There were 772 housing units at an average density of 14.0 per square mile (5.4/km^{2}). The racial makeup of the town was 97.74% White, 0.52% African American, 0.28% Native American, 0.09% Asian, 0.09% Pacific Islander, 0.66% from other races, and 0.61% from two or more races. Hispanic or Latino of any race were 1.37% of the population.

There were 739 households, out of which 38.6% had children under the age of 18 living with them, 66.6% were married couples living together, 7.2% had a female householder with no husband present, and 21.2% were non-families. 16.8% of all households were made up of individuals, and 7.6% had someone living alone who was 65 years of age or older. The average household size was 2.87 and the average family size was 3.22.

In the town, the population was spread out, with 28.8% under the age of 18, 6.5% from 18 to 24, 29.6% from 25 to 44, 25.3% from 45 to 64, and 9.8% who were 65 years of age or older. The median age was 36 years. For every 100 females, there were 106.8 males. For every 100 females age 18 and over, there were 102.4 males.

The median income for a household in the town was $44,545, and the median income for a family was $47,411. Males had a median income of $32,284 versus $21,193 for females. The per capita income for the town was $17,129. About 4.5% of families and 6.3% of the population were below the poverty line, including 6.7% of those under age 18 and 8.2% of those age 65 or over.

== Notable people ==
- Lorenzo Burrows, former US Congressman
- Frank Hamilton Cushing, (1857-1900), American anthropologist and ethnologist, lived in Barre as a young boy.
- John G. Sawyer, former US Congressman
- Chester Harding, noted American portrait painter
- Charles H. Nesbitt, former Assembly minority leader

== Communities and locations in Barre ==
- Barre Center – A hamlet on NY-98, south of the Village of Albion and near the center of the town.
- Braggs Corners – A location southwest of Barre Center.
- Burma Woods – A hamlet in the western part of the town and north of West Barre.
- Pine Hill Airport (9G6) – A small general aviation airport near the west town line and west of Burma Woods.
- South Barre – A hamlet in the southeast part of the town.
- West Barre – A hamlet actually located in the south-central part of the town.

== Farms ==
Barre is a "right-to-farm" community.
