= Knowlesville, New York =

- Hamlet
- Location within New York Location within the United States
- Coordinates: 43°14′31″N 78°18′38″W
- Country: United States
- State: New York
- County: Orleans
- Elevation: 512 ft (156 m)
- Time zone: UTC-5 (Eastern (EST))
  - Summer (DST): UTC-4 (EDT)
- ZIP code: 14479
- Area code: 585
- GNIS feature ID: 954790

Knowlesville is a hamlet in Orleans County, New York, United States. The community is located along the Erie Canal, 4.1 miles (6.6 km) east-northeast of Medina. Knowlesville had a post office from March 11, 1826, until July 4, 2009; it still has its own ZIP code, 14479.
