= Orleans County, New York =

County in New York, United States

- County
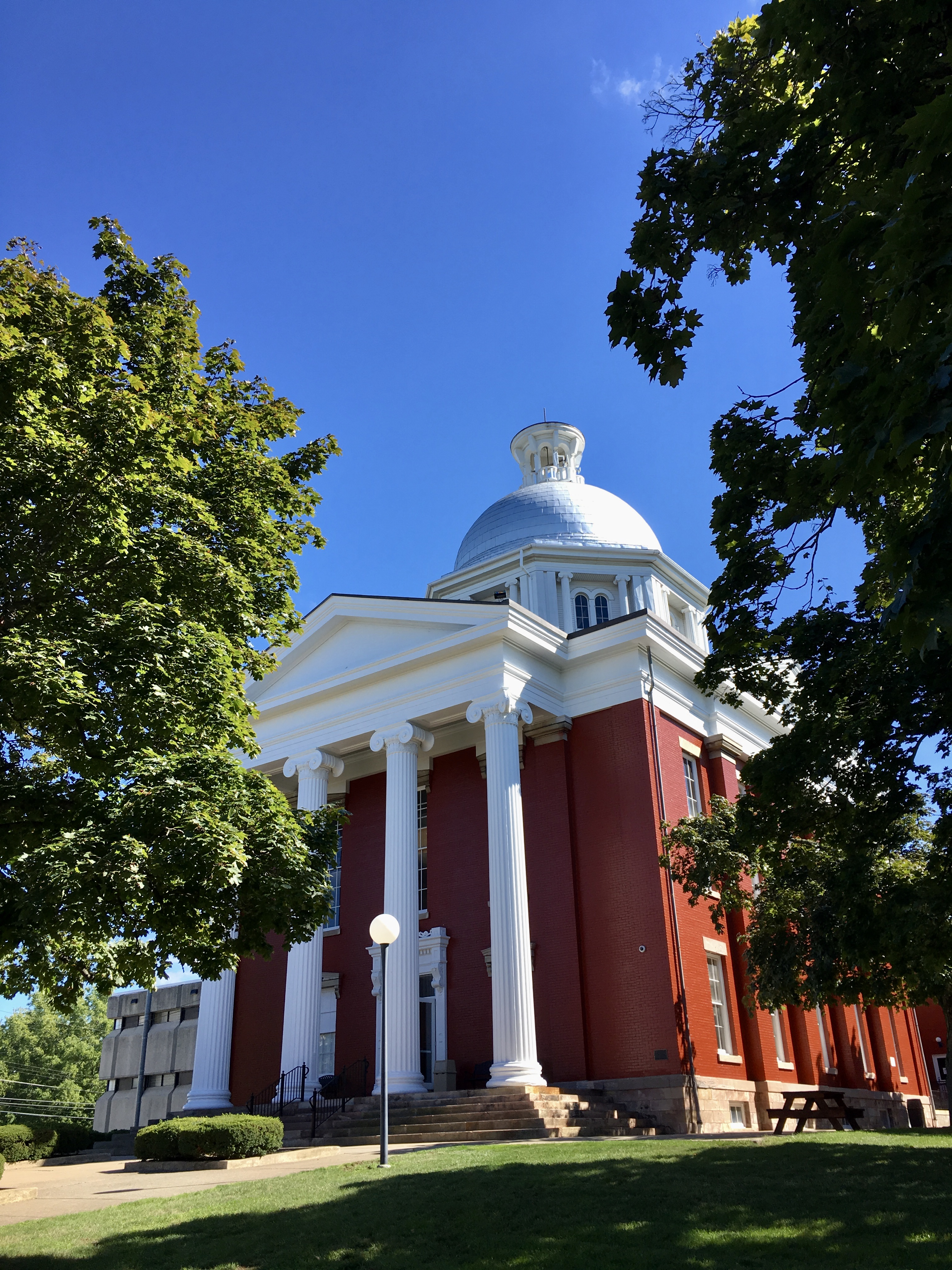
- County Courthouse in Albion

- Seal

- Location within the U.S. state of New York
- Coordinates: 43°22′N 78°14′W
- Country: United States
- State: New York
- Founded: 1824
- Named for: House of Orléans
- Seat: Albion
- Largest village: Medina

Area
  - Total: 817 sq mi (2,120 km^{2})
  - Land: 391 sq mi (1,010 km^{2})
  - Water: 426 sq mi (1,100 km^{2}) 52%

Population (2020)
  - Total: 40,343
  - Estimate (2025): 39,825 ▼
  - Density: 103/sq mi (40/km^{2})
- Time zone: UTC−5 (Eastern)
  - Summer (DST): UTC−4 (EDT)
- Congressional district: 24th
- Website: www.orleanscountyny.gov

Orleans County is a county in the western part of the U.S. state of New York. As of the 2020 census, the population was 40,343. The county seat is Albion. The county received its name at the insistence of Nehemiah Ingersoll though historians are unsure how the name was selected. The two competing theories are that it was named to honor the French Royal House of Orleans or that it was to honor Andrew Jackson's victory in New Orleans. The county is part of the Finger Lakes region of the state.

Located on the south shore of Lake Ontario, Orleans County since the late 20th century has been considered part of the Rochester, New York metropolitan area.

== History ==
When counties were established by the British authorities in the province of New York in 1683, the present Orleans County was part of the territory of Albany County. This was an enormous county, including the northern part of present-day New York State as well as all of the present State of Vermont and, in theory, extending westward to the Pacific Ocean. This county was reduced in size on July 3, 1766, by the creation of Cumberland County, and further on March 16, 1770, by the creation of Gloucester County, both containing territory now in Vermont.

On March 12, 1772, the remaining Albany County was split into three parts, one remaining under the name Albany County. Tryon County contained the large western portion (and thus, since no western boundary was specified, theoretically still extended west to the Pacific). The eastern boundary of Tryon County was approximately five miles west of the present city of Schenectady, and the county included the Mohawk River valley, the western part of the Adirondack Mountains and the area west of the West Branch of the Delaware River. The area then designated as Tryon County now includes 37 counties of New York State. The county was named for William Tryon, colonial governor of New York. This western area was occupied largely by the Onondaga, Oneida and other western nations of the Iroquois Confederacy. The westernmost European settlements were in the area of Little Falls and present-day Herkimer.

During the unrest prior to the outbreak of the American Revolutionary War, feelings ran high in the Mohawk Valley, and there were local attacks by rebels against known Loyalists. Most of Tryon County's Loyalists fled to Canada before 1776, where they were later granted land by the Crown to develop what is now Ontario.

In 1784, following the peace treaty that ended the American Revolutionary War, Tryon County's name was changed to Montgomery County to honor the general, Richard Montgomery. He had captured several places in Canada and died attempting to capture the city of Quebec. It replaced the name of the now hated colonial British governor. In 1789, Ontario County split off from Montgomery. During this period, thousands of migrants settled in the western part of the state from New England and eastern New York resulting in the creation of more counties.

In 1802, Genesee County was created by splitting Ontario County. Genesee County was then divided into Allegany County in 1806, Cattaraugus, Chautauqua, and Niagara Counties in 1808, Ontario, Livingston, and Monroe Counties in 1821, and finally Orleans County in 1824.

When Orleans County was formed in 1824, a dispute arose about naming it after President Andrew Jackson or President John Adams. During and following the Napoleonic era in France, numerous French refugees came to New York, some settling in the upstate areas.

== Geography ==
According to the U.S. Census Bureau, the county has a total area of 817 square miles (2,120 km^{2}), of which 391 square miles (1,010 km^{2}) is land and 426 square miles (1,100 km^{2}) (52%) is water.

The high proportion of water is due to the extension of Orleans County north into Lake Ontario to the Canada–US border (a line of latitude running through the middle of the lake). The distance from the Orleans shore north to the international border is greater than the distance from the shore south to the Genesee County line, meaning the area of Orleans under water is greater than that above water.

Orleans County is in western New York State, northeast of Buffalo and west of Rochester, on the southern shore of Lake Ontario.

The Erie Canal passes (east–west) through the middle of the county. When its construction was completed in 1824, it attracted new settlers to the largely rural county. Trade and passenger traffic stimulated the development of local businesses.

=== Adjacent counties ===
- Monroe County - east
- Genesee County - south
- Niagara County - west

=== National protected area ===
- Iroquois National Wildlife Refuge (part)

=== State protected areas ===
- Lakeside Beach State Park
- Oak Orchard State Marine Park
- Oak Orchard Wildlife Management Area
- Tonawanda Wildlife Management Area

== Government and politics ==
United States presidential election results for Orleans County, New York
Year	Republican		Democratic		Third party(ies)	
Year	No.	%	No.	%	No.	%
1884	3,997	52.31%	2,907	38.04%	737	9.65%
1888	4,277	51.98%	3,214	39.06%	737	8.96%
1892	4,013	52.29%	3,065	39.94%	596	7.77%
1896	4,664	58.97%	2,993	37.84%	252	3.19%
1900	4,667	59.14%	2,851	36.13%	373	4.73%
1904	5,027	63.49%	2,502	31.60%	389	4.91%
1908	4,885	62.31%	2,590	33.04%	365	4.66%
1912	2,983	41.36%	2,448	33.94%	1,781	24.69%
1916	4,903	64.41%	2,529	33.22%	180	2.36%
1920	8,305	72.79%	2,266	19.86%	839	7.35%
1924	8,543	71.91%	2,320	19.53%	1,017	8.56%
1928	9,828	68.77%	3,792	26.53%	672	4.70%
1932	9,735	67.98%	4,303	30.05%	283	1.98%
1936	10,569	70.49%	4,016	26.78%	409	2.73%
1940	10,958	70.61%	4,525	29.16%	36	0.23%
1944	9,998	71.28%	4,006	28.56%	22	0.16%
1948	9,566	69.15%	4,009	28.98%	259	1.87%
1952	11,686	74.97%	3,893	24.98%	8	0.05%
1956	11,895	77.45%	3,464	22.55%	0	0.00%
1960	10,344	65.20%	5,515	34.76%	5	0.03%
1964	5,567	37.37%	9,304	62.46%	25	0.17%
1968	8,509	60.67%	4,786	34.13%	729	5.20%
1972	10,938	71.35%	4,371	28.51%	20	0.13%
1976	8,994	59.87%	5,927	39.45%	102	0.68%
1980	7,536	51.58%	5,767	39.47%	1,308	8.95%
1984	10,543	70.17%	4,429	29.48%	52	0.35%
1988	9,028	59.97%	5,913	39.28%	114	0.76%
1992	7,468	44.57%	4,927	29.41%	4,359	26.02%
1996	6,865	44.96%	6,233	40.82%	2,170	14.21%
2000	9,202	58.08%	5,991	37.81%	651	4.11%
2004	10,317	62.24%	5,959	35.95%	301	1.82%
2008	9,708	58.54%	6,614	39.88%	262	1.58%
2012	8,594	58.44%	5,787	39.35%	325	2.21%
2016	10,936	66.76%	4,470	27.29%	974	5.95%
2020	12,126	66.80%	5,587	30.78%	441	2.43%
2024	12,659	70.05%	5,366	29.69%	46	0.25%

Starting in 1824, the county government was run by a board of supervisors, consisting of elected supervisors from each township in Orleans County. This geographic representation meant that the residents of more urbanized areas were underrepresented on the board.

In 1980, the state and county established a seven-member elected legislature to replace the board of supervisors. Representatives are elected from single-member districts roughly equal in population. It is headed by a chairman.

Orleans County is heavily Republican. It has voted Republican in every presidential election since the party's founding in 1856, except for one, 1964. It also voted Whig in every presidential election from 1828 until 1852.

=== County government ===
==== Orleans County legislature ====
Office	District	Area of the county	Officeholder	Party	Residence
County Legislator - Vice Chairman	District 1	Barre, Clarendon, Shelby	William H. Eick	Republican	Medina
County Legislator - Chairwoman	District 2	Ridgeway, Yates, Shelby	Lynne M. Johnson	Republican	Lyndonville
County Legislator - Minority Leader	District 3	Albion, Gaines	Fred Miller	Democratic	Albion
County Legislator	District 4	Carlton, Kendall, Murray	John M. Fitzak	Republican	Kendall
County Legislator	At Large	West	Merle L. "Skip" Draper	Republican	Ridgeway
County Legislator	At Large	Central	Don Allport	Republican	Albion
County Legislator	At Large	East	Edward F. Morgan	Republican	Holley

==== Orleans County elected officials ====
Office	Officeholder	Party
County Judge	Sanford A. Church	Republican
District Attorney	Susan Howard	Republican
County Clerk	Nadine P. Hanlon	Republican
County Treasurer	Kimberly C. L. DeFrank	Republican
Coroner	Scott M. Schmidt	Republican
Coroner	Rocco L. Sidari	Republican
Coroner	Julie Woodworth	Republican

==== State and federal government ====
Office	District	Officeholder	Party	First took office	Residence
Congressman	New York's 24th congressional district	Claudia Tenney	Republican	2021	Canandaigua, Ontario County
State Senator	62nd State Senate District	Rob Ortt	Republican	2015	North Tonawanda, Niagara County
State Assemblyman	139th State Assembly District	Stephen M. Hawley	Republican	2006	Batavia, Genesee County

Orleans County is part of:

- The 8th Judicial District of the New York Supreme Court
- The 4th Division of the New York Supreme Court, Appellate Division

== Demographics ==
Historical population
Census	Pop.	Note	%±
1830	17,732		—
1840	25,127		41.7%
1850	28,501		13.4%
1860	28,717		0.8%
1870	27,689		−3.6%
1880	30,128		8.8%
1890	30,803		2.2%
1900	30,164		−2.1%
1910	32,000		6.1%
1920	28,619		−10.6%
1930	28,795		0.6%
1940	27,760		−3.6%
1950	29,832		7.5%
1960	34,159		14.5%
1970	37,305		9.2%
1980	38,496		3.2%
1990	41,846		8.7%
2000	44,171		5.6%
2010	42,883		−2.9%
2020	40,343		−5.9%
2025 (est.)	39,825	▼	−1.3%
U.S. Decennial Census; 1790-1960 1900-1990; 1990-2000 2010-2013

=== 2020 census ===
Orleans County, New York – Racial and ethnic composition Note: the US Census treats Hispanic/Latino as an ethnic category. This table excludes Latinos from the racial categories and assigns them to a separate category. Hispanics/Latinos may be of any race.
Race / Ethnicity (NH = Non-Hispanic)	Pop 1980	Pop 1990	Pop 2000	Pop 2010	Pop 2020	% 1980	% 1990	% 2000	% 2010	% 2020
White alone (NH)	35,836	37,890	38,552	37,658	34,037	93.09%	90.55%	87.28%	87.82%	84.37%
Black or African American alone (NH)	1,962	2,574	3,047	2,368	1,840	5.10%	6.15%	6.90%	5.52%	4.56%
Native American or Alaska Native alone (NH)	159	187	180	199	177	0.41%	0.45%	0.41%	0.46%	0.44%
Asian alone (NH)	79	135	137	173	154	0.21%	0.32%	0.31%	0.40%	0.38%
Native Hawaiian or Pacific Islander alone (NH)	x	x	10	7	12	x	x	0.02%	0.02%	0.03%
Other race alone (NH)	55	31	57	32	141	0.14%	0.07%	0.13%	0.07%	0.35%
Mixed race or Multiracial (NH)	x	x	469	689	1,895	x	x	1.06%	1.61%	4.70%
Hispanic or Latino (any race)	405	1,029	1,719	1,757	2,087	1.05%	2.46%	3.89%	4.10%	5.17%
Total	38,496	41,846	44,171	42,883	40,343	100.00%	100.00%	100.00%	100.00%	100.00%

=== 2000 census ===
As of the census of 2010, there were 42,883 people, 16,119 households, and 10,872 families residing in the county. The population density was 113 inhabitants per square mile (44/km^{2}). There were 17,347 housing units at an average density of 44 units per square mile (17/km^{2}). The racial makeup of the county was 89.8% White, 5.9% Black or African American, 0.6% Native American, 0.4% Asian, 0.0% Pacific Islander, 1.3% from other races, and 1.9% from two or more races. 4.1% of the population were Hispanic or Latino of any race. According to Census 2000, 20.3% were of German, 18.3% English, 10.8% Italian, 10.3% Irish, 9.4% American and 7.3% Polish ancestry and 96.0% spoke English and 3.0% Spanish as their first language.

Census 2010 showed there were 16,119 households, out of which 31.2% had children under the age of 18 living with them, 49% were married couples living together, 12.4% had a female householder with no husband present, and 32.6% were non-families. 26.2% of all households were made up of individuals, and 11% had someone living alone who was 65 years of age or older. The average household size was 2.5 and the average family size was 2.99.

In the county, the population was spread out, with 19.8% under the age of 18, 8.8% from 18 to 24, 24.2% from 25 to 44, 29.8% from 45 to 64, and 17.40% who were 65 years of age or older. The median age was 41 years.

The median income for a household in the county was $48,731. Males had a median income of $32,450 versus $22,605 for females. The per capita income for the county was $16,457. About 15.2% of the population were below the poverty line.

== Education ==
Public schools

The county has five school districts, although the actual district boundaries can extend into neighboring counties, and the same is true for neighboring counties' districts. The five districts, from west to east, are:

- Lyndonville Central School District (northern half of western third, roughly covering Lyndonville village and the towns of Yates and Ridgeway)
- Medina Central School District (southern half of western third, roughly covering Medina village and the towns of Ridgeway and Shelby)
- Albion Central School District (middle third, roughly covering Albion village and the towns of Carlton, Gaines, Albion, and Barre)
- Kendall Central School District (northern half of eastern third, roughly covering the towns of Kendall and Murray)
- Holley Central School District (southern half of eastern third, roughly covering Holley village and the towns of Murray and Clarendon)

Each of these school districts participates in Orleans/Niagara BOCES or Monroe #2-Orleans BOCES.

Private school

There is currently one non-denominational K-12 school in the county.

- Orleans County Christian School

College

One college maintains satellite campuses in Orleans County.

- Genesee Community College - Albion (This campus has been declared defunct, with all staff & operations moved to Medina campus)
- Genesee Community College - Medina

== Recreation ==
The County of Orleans has created an interactive map of notable places for visitors to see while visiting the county.

https://orleanscountytourism.com/history/

=== Lakes ===
There are two major dams on Oak Orchard Creek that have created public boating areas.

- Waterport Pond in the town of Carlton also called lake Alice by locals.
- Glenwood Lake in the town of Ridgeway and the village of Medina

=== Libraries ===
Orleans County has 4 public libraries serving its population.

- Community Free Library, located in Holley
- Hoag Library, located in Albion
- Lee-Whedon Memorial Library, located in Medina
- Yates Community Library, located in Lyndonville

=== Museums ===
Orleans County has 6 museums that are open to the public.

- Clarendon Historical Society Museum & Farwell's Settlement
- The Cobblestone Museum
- Holley Depot Museum
- Medina Railroad Museum
- Murray-Holley Historical Society
- Oak Orchard Lighthouse Museum

=== Parks ===
There are two State Parks and many municipal parks spread throughout the county.

- Lakeside Beach State Park
- Oak Orchard Marine State Park

== Transportation ==
Orleans County has eight private airstrips and one public-use airport:

- Pine Hill Airport (New York) (9G6)

RTS Orleans provides bus service to Orleans County. The county's Department of Public Works is headquartered in Albion and is charged with maintaining roads, including:

- Overseeing construction and repair of county roads, bridges, and ditches
- Removing snow and ice

Each town and village within Orleans County maintains its own highway department.

=== Major roadways ===
- New York State Route 18
- New York State Route 31
- New York State Route 31A
- New York State Route 31E
- New York State Route 63
- New York State Route 98
- New York State Route 104
- New York State Route 237
- New York State Route 269
- New York State Route 272
- New York State Route 279
- New York State Route 387
- Lake Ontario State Parkway
- List of county routes in Orleans County, New York

The former New York State Route 941M was located in Orleans County.

== Communities ==
=== Larger Settlements ===
All larger settlements are Villages

#	Location	Population
1	Medina	6,065
2	†Albion	6,056
3	Holley	1,811
4	Lyndonville	838

The town and village borders

=== Towns ===
- Albion
- Barre
- Carlton
- Clarendon
- Gaines
- Kendall
- Murray
- Ridgeway
- Shelby
- Yates

=== Villages ===
- Albion (county seat)
- Holley
- Lyndonville
- Medina

=== Hamlets ===
- Ashwood
- Barre Center
- Baldwin Corner
- Brockville
- Carlton Station
- Childs
- County Line
- Eagle Harbor
- East Shelby
- Fancher
- Gaines
- Hindsburg
- Hulberton
- Jeddo
- Jones Beach
- Kendall Mills
- Kent
- Kenyonville
- Knowlesville
- Kuckville
- Lomond Shore
- Millers
- Millville
- Oak Orchard
- Point Breeze
- Sawyer
- Shadigee
- Shelby Center
- Sunset Beach
- Yates Center
- Waterport
- West Barre
- West Gaines
- West Shelby

== See also ==
- Orleans County Sheriff's Office
- List of fire departments in Orleans County, New York
- List of counties in New York
- National Register of Historic Places listings in Orleans County, New York
- The Orleans County Libertarian Party
