= Oak Orchard Creek =

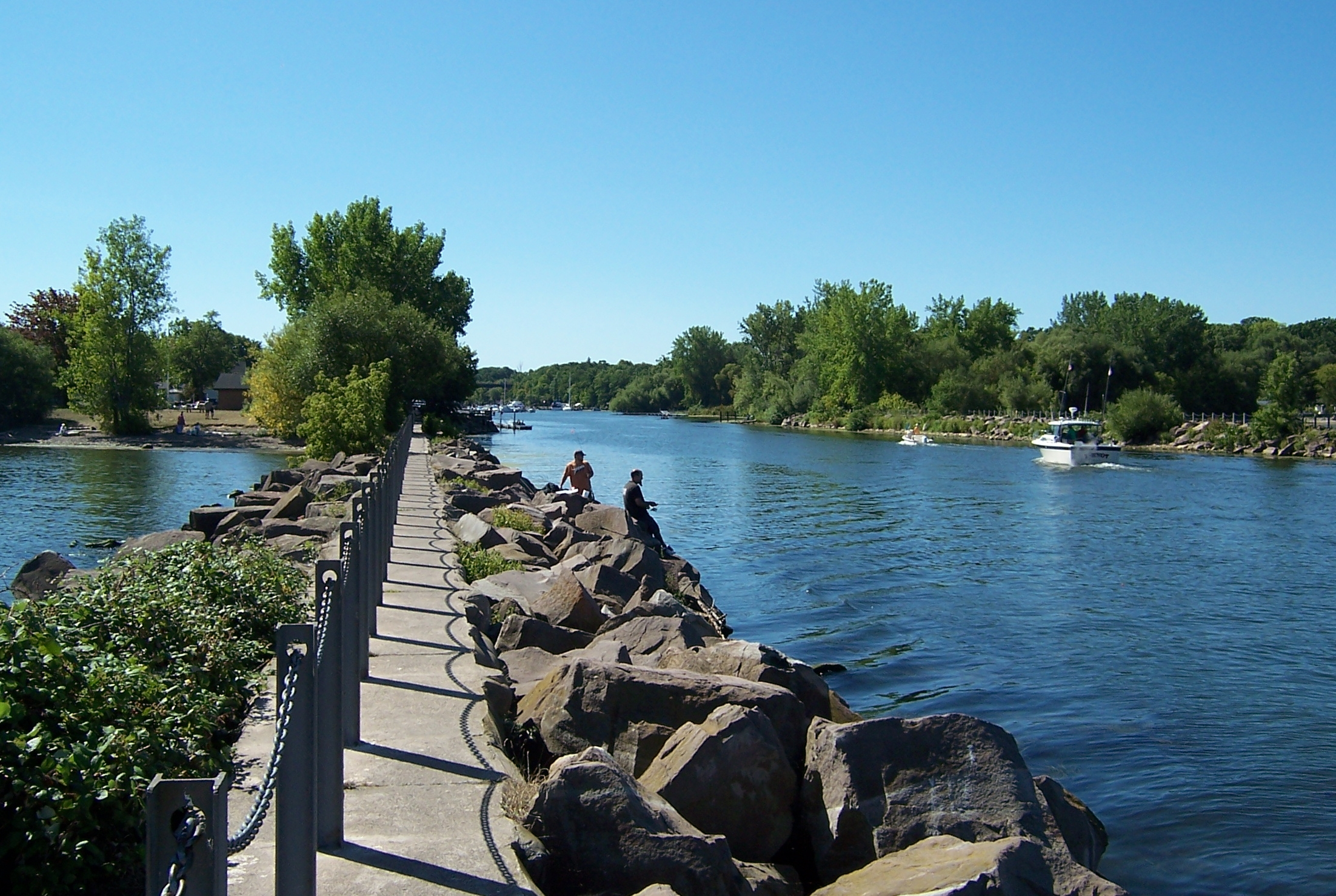
- The mouth of the creek, at Point Breeze

- Location of the mouth of the Oak Orchard Creek in New York State. Oak Orchard Creek (the United States)

Location
- Country: United States
- State: New York
- Counties: Orleans, Genesee

Physical characteristics
- Source
  - location: Elba, Genesee County
  - coordinates: 43°02′40″N 78°12′44″W
- Mouth: Lake Ontario
  - location: Carlton, Orleans County
  - coordinates: 43°22′18″N 78°11′32″W
- Discharge
  - location: Kenyonville
  - average: 346 cu ft/s (9.8 m^{3}/s)

Oak Orchard Creek (sometimes called Oak Orchard River) is a tributary of Lake Ontario in Orleans County, New York in the United States.

The creek flows through Oak Orchard Creek Marsh, 600 acres (2.4 km^{2}) of which were declared a National Natural Landmark in May 1973. The marshlands through which Oak Orchard Creek flows are a major stopover points for migratory birds, and are protected by state- and federally-designated conservation areas.

== Course ==
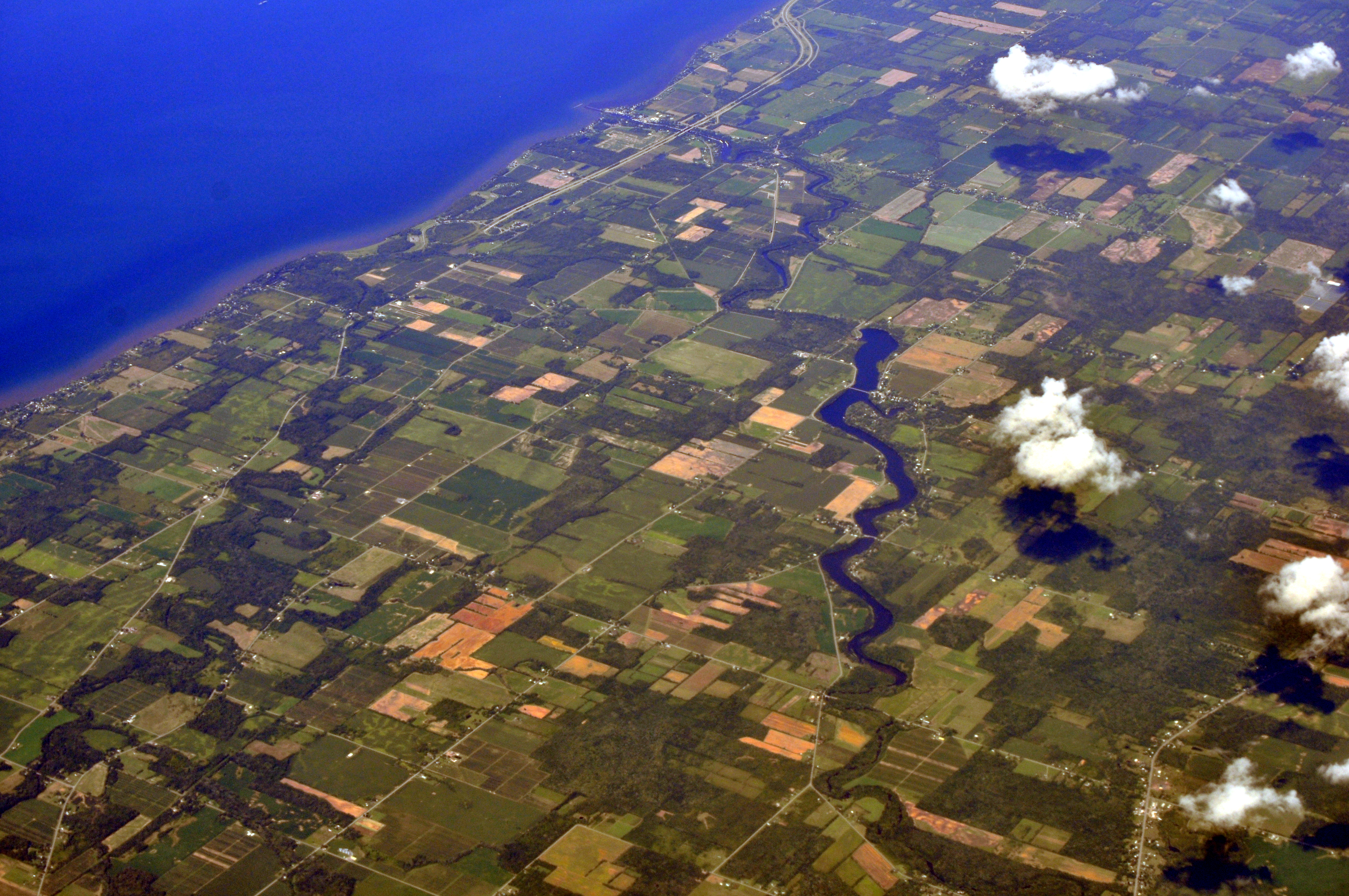
Aerial view of Oak Orchard Creek, 2013. The creek is slightly right of center in the photo, running roughly vertically from the bottom of the image to the lake at top.

Oak Orchard Creek rises south of Oak Orchard Creek Marsh (also called the "Alabama Swamp") at the border of Orleans and Genesee counties. The swamp contains a state reserve, Oak Orchard Wildlife Management Area, and a national reserve, the Iroquois National Wildlife Refuge, both of which are known as major stopover points for migratory birds. Oak Orchard Creek Marsh was designated a National Natural Landmark in May 1973. The swamp is a result of a partial blockage of the river by glacial drift and an outcrop of limestone and dolomite known as the Lockport Formation which forms the Niagara Escarpment.

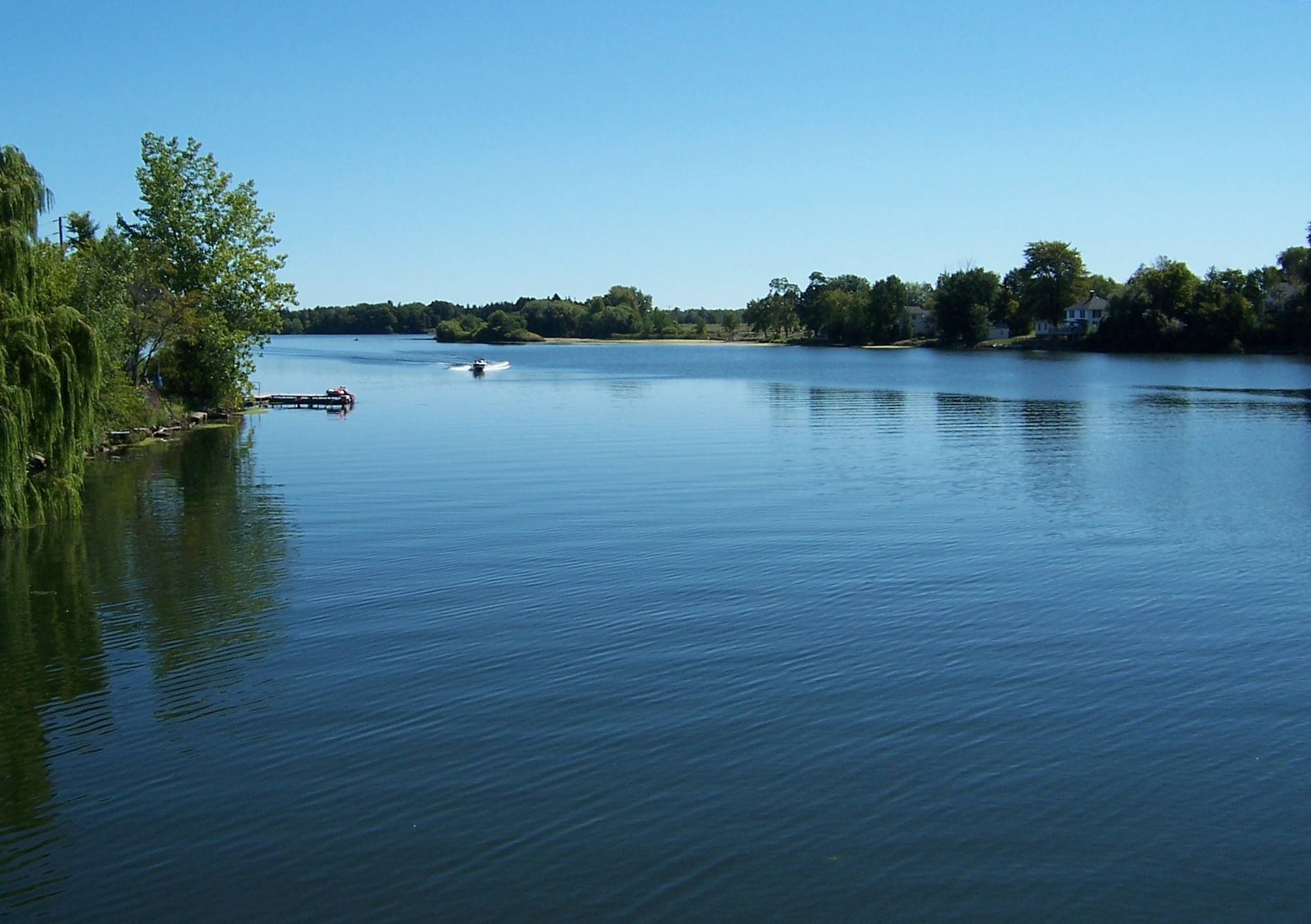
Waterport Pond, also known as Lake Alice, is the widest point of Oak Orchard Creek

After flowing through the swamp, it flows northward, across the escarpment in a series of waterfalls and rapids at Shelby Center, thence passing through the Village of Medina to the small Glenwood Lake north of the village. The creek departs the town of Ridgeway at its northeast corner, cuts through the northwest corner of the town of Gaines, and widens before entering the town of Carlton. The widest part is now known as Waterport Pond (Lake Alice), and the hamlet of Waterport is on the south bank. A dam at the northeast end of the pond controls water flow.

Oak Orchard Creek narrows again and passes underneath Route 18 and the Lake Ontario State Parkway before entering Lake Ontario at Point Breeze where Oak Orchard State Marine Park is located. The lower part of the creek remains relatively ice-free during winters presumably due to steady flow of water and hydro-plant at Waterport.

== Sporting activities ==
=== Boating ===
Several boat launch locations exist in the lower Oak Orchard Creek. Two are near Point Breeze at the state park. Three more are near the Route 18 overpass. Boating is limited to a short distance upstream from a point called Toms Landing due to the shallow depth. Most boaters enter the creek in order to fish.

There is some concern about pollutants from anti-fouling paint on boat hulls.

=== Fishing ===
The state fish hatcheries release brown trout, salmon and steelhead each year into the river. Fishing may be done from boats in the lower part, by wading in the upper parts, and from the shore along its length.

=== Other activities ===
The entire area of public lands is open for birdwatching and hiking. Within the Oak Orchard Swamp other activities, such as hunting and trapping, can be done by permit. Boating is restricted to non-powered boats, and picnicking and camping are restricted to specific areas.

== See also ==
- List of rivers of New York
- List of National Natural Landmarks in New York
