= Carlton, New York =

Carlton, New York Oak Orchard
- Town
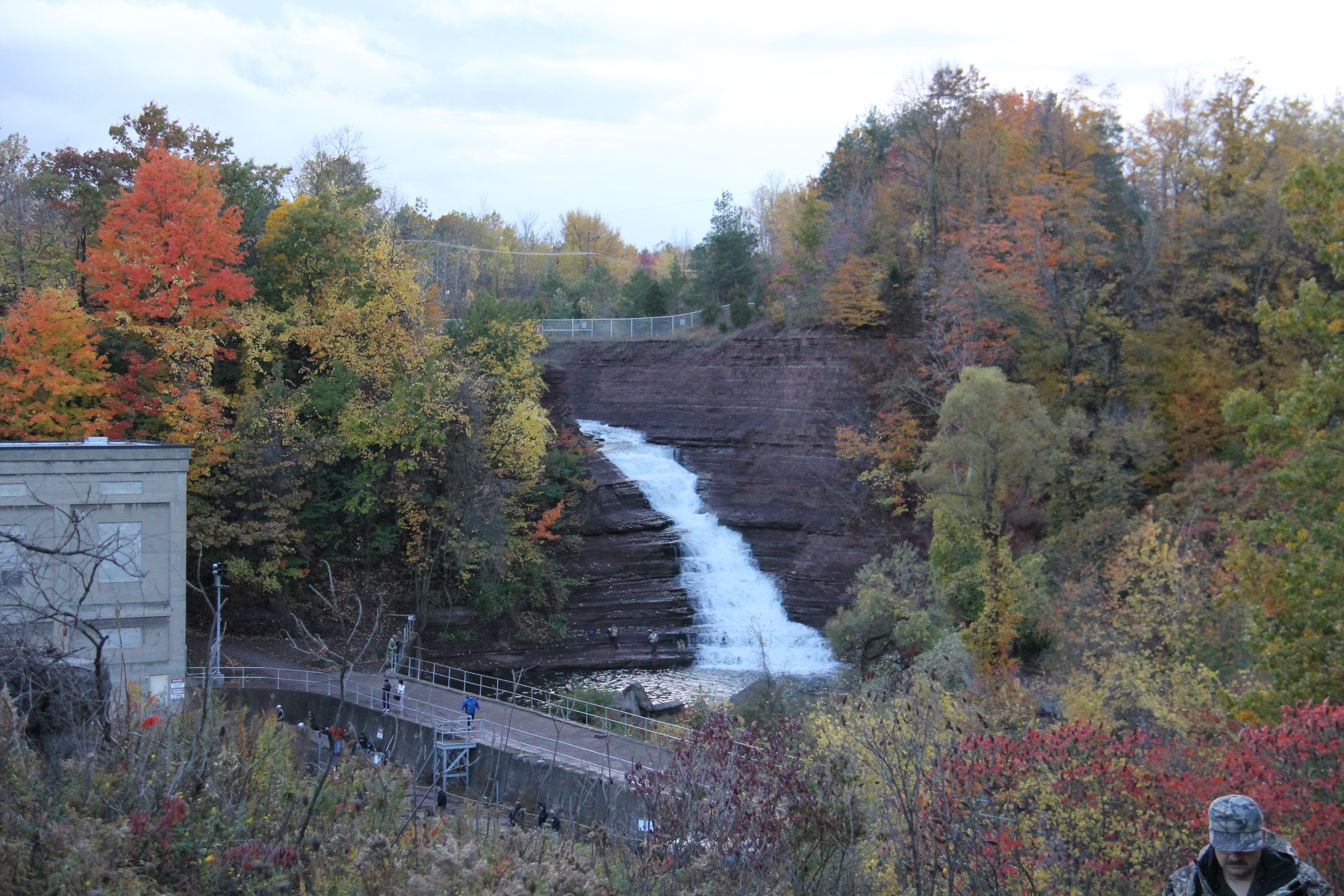

- Location in Orleans County and the state of New York.

- Location of New York in the United States
- Coordinates: 43°20′21″N 78°12′51″W
- Country: United States
- State: New York
- County: Orleans

Area
  - Total: 44.41 sq mi (115.02 km^{2})
  - Land: 43.61 sq mi (112.94 km^{2})
  - Water: 0.80 sq mi (2.07 km^{2})
- Elevation: 246 ft (75 m)

Population (2010)
  - Total: 2,994
  - Estimate (2016): 2,905
  - Density: 66.6/sq mi (25.72/km^{2})
- Time zone: UTC-5 (Eastern (EST))
  - Summer (DST): UTC-4 (EDT)
- FIPS code: 36-12496
- GNIS feature ID: 0978792

Carlton is a town in Orleans County, New York, United States. The population was 2,994 at the 2010 census. The name is derived from Carleton, a shipbuilding district near Ottawa, Ontario, Canada.

The Town of Carlton lies in the north part of the county, on the shore of Lake Ontario.

== History ==
The Town of Carlton was formed from the towns of Gaines and Ridgeway in 1822 and was then known as the "Town of Oak Orchard". It was renamed as "Carlton" in 1825.

The population was 2,297 in 1892.

=== Notable events ===
On July 27, 1883, Illinois politician Thomas Hoyne died in a railroad accident which took place outside of the hamlet of Carlton Station. He was subsequently buried at Rosehill Cemetery in Chicago.

On September 1, 2010, five teenagers were charged with disrupting religious services at the World Sufi Foundation mosque located in Carlton. The teenagers were accused of discharging a firearm, yelling obscenities, and hitting a mosque attendee with a car.

Point Breeze, a hamlet in Carlton located at the meeting point of Lake Ontario and the Oak Orchard River, was selected in 2013 by the World Fishing Network as the United States' "Ultimate Fishing Town" following an online competition that highlighted the town's sport fishing assets.

== Geography ==
According to the United States Census Bureau, the town has a total area of 44.5 square miles (115 km^{2}), of which 43.7 square miles (113 km^{2}) is land and 0.8 square miles (2.1 km^{2}) (1.86%) is water.

The Oak Orchard River enters Lake Ontario in the north part of Carlton, as does Johnson Creek. The Lake Ontario State Parkway begins in the town and ends in Monroe County, New York. New York State Route 18 is the major east–west route traversing the town, while north-south Routes NY-98 and NY-279 have their northern termini in Carlton.

== Demographics ==
Historical population
| Census | Pop. | Note | %± |
|---|---|---|---|
| 1830 | 1,168 | | — |
| 1840 | 2,275 | | 94.8% |
| 1850 | 2,809 | | 23.5% |
| 1860 | 2,447 | | −12.9% |
| 1870 | 2,327 | | −4.9% |
| 1880 | 2,477 | | 6.4% |
| 1890 | 2,374 | | −4.2% |
| 1900 | 2,338 | | −1.5% |
| 1910 | 2,259 | | −3.4% |
| 1920 | 1,832 | | −18.9% |
| 1930 | 1,699 | | −7.3% |
| 1940 | 1,540 | | −9.4% |
| 1950 | 1,775 | | 15.3% |
| 1960 | 2,800 | | 57.7% |
| 1970 | 2,540 | | −9.3% |
| 1980 | 2,818 | | 10.9% |
| 1990 | 2,808 | | −0.4% |
| 2000 | 2,960 | | 5.4% |
| 2010 | 2,994 | | 1.1% |
| 2016 (est.) | 2,905 | | −3.0% |
U.S. Decennial Census

As of the census of 2000, there were 2,960 people, 1,103 households, and 793 families residing in the town. The population density was 67.7 inhabitants per square mile (26.1/km^{2}). There were 1,619 housing units at an average density of 37.0 per square mile (14.3/km^{2}). The racial makeup of the town was 94.32% White, 3.24% African American, 0.54% Native American, 0.10% Asian, 0.03% Pacific Islander, 0.91% from other races, and 0.84% from two or more races. Hispanic or Latino of any race were 1.11% of the population.

There were 1,103 households, out of which 34.1% had children under the age of 18 living with them, 58.3% were married couples living together, 8.3% had a female householder with no husband present, and 28.1% were non-families. 21.3% of all households were made up of individuals, and 7.8% had someone living alone who was 65 years of age or older. The average household size was 2.68 and the average family size was 3.11.

In the town, the population was spread out, with 26.9% under the age of 18, 6.0% from 18 to 24, 29.3% from 25 to 44, 26.8% from 45 to 64, and 10.9% who were 65 years of age or older. The median age was 38 years. For every 100 females, there were 110.7 males. For every 100 females age 18 and over, there were 107.8 males.

The median income for a household in the town was $40,660, and the median income for a family was $42,028. Males had a median income of $32,188 versus $23,448 for females. The per capita income for the town was $17,439. About 7.9% of families and 10.3% of the population were below the poverty line, including 17.5% of those under age 18 and 4.8% of those age 65 or over.

== Gallery ==
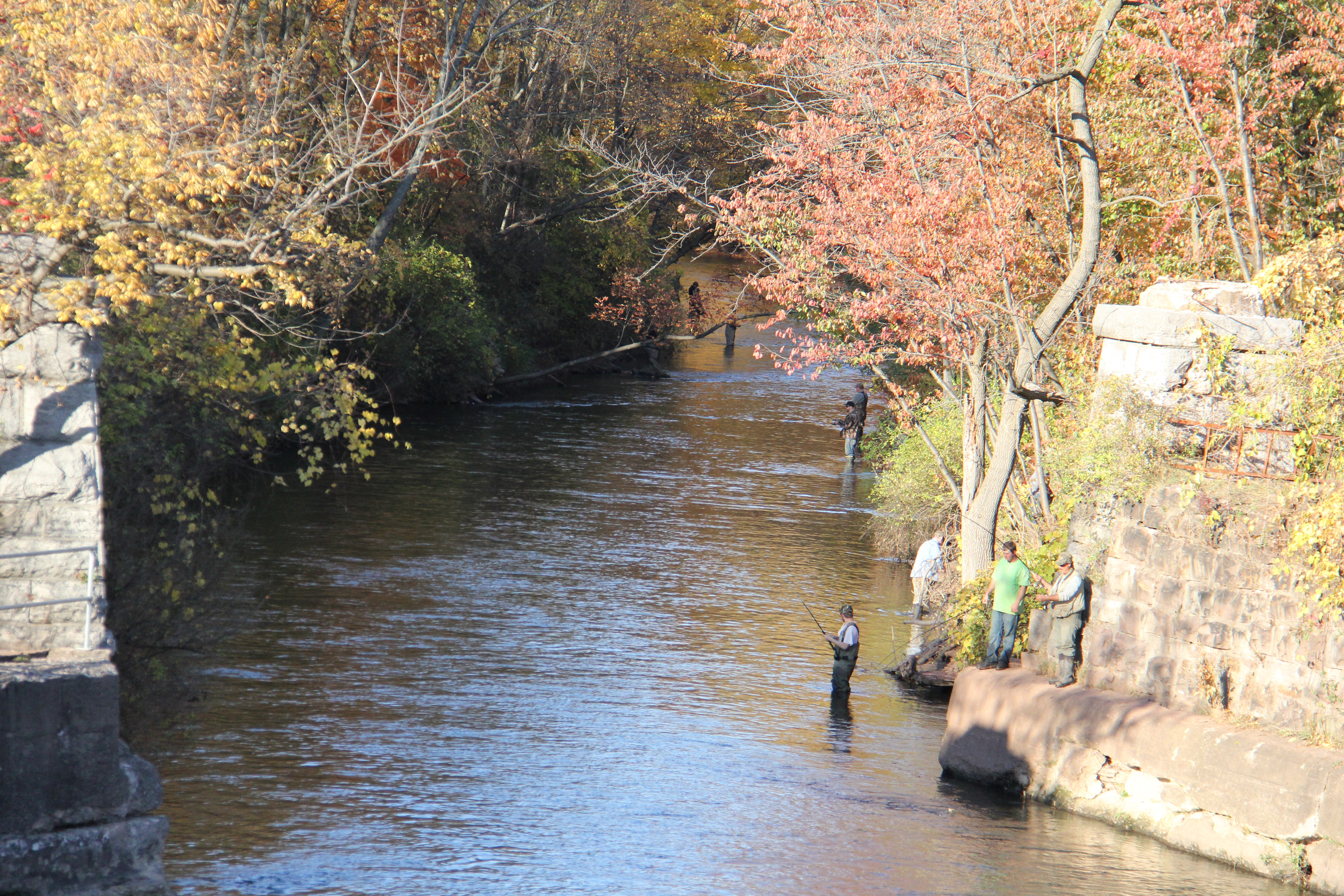

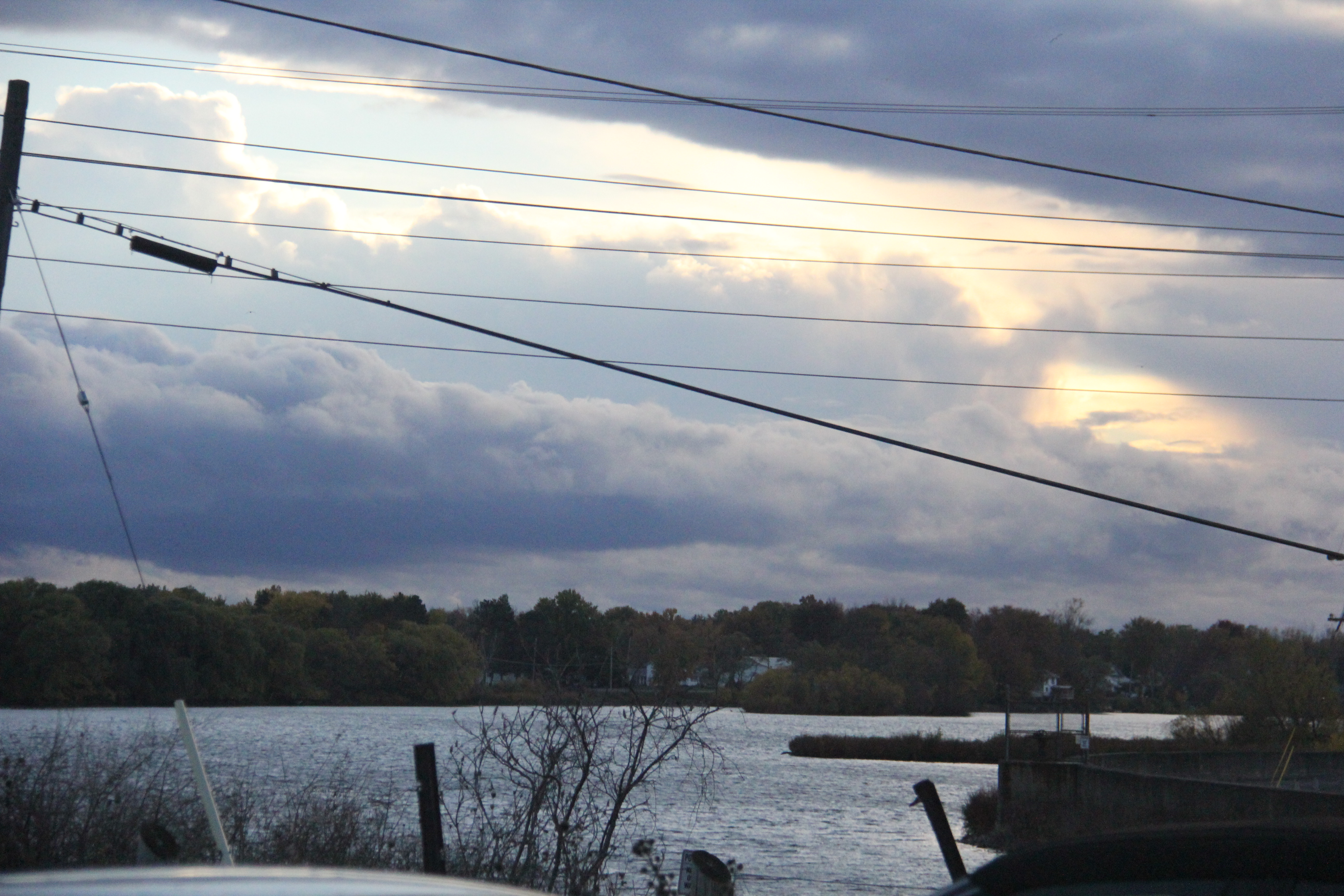

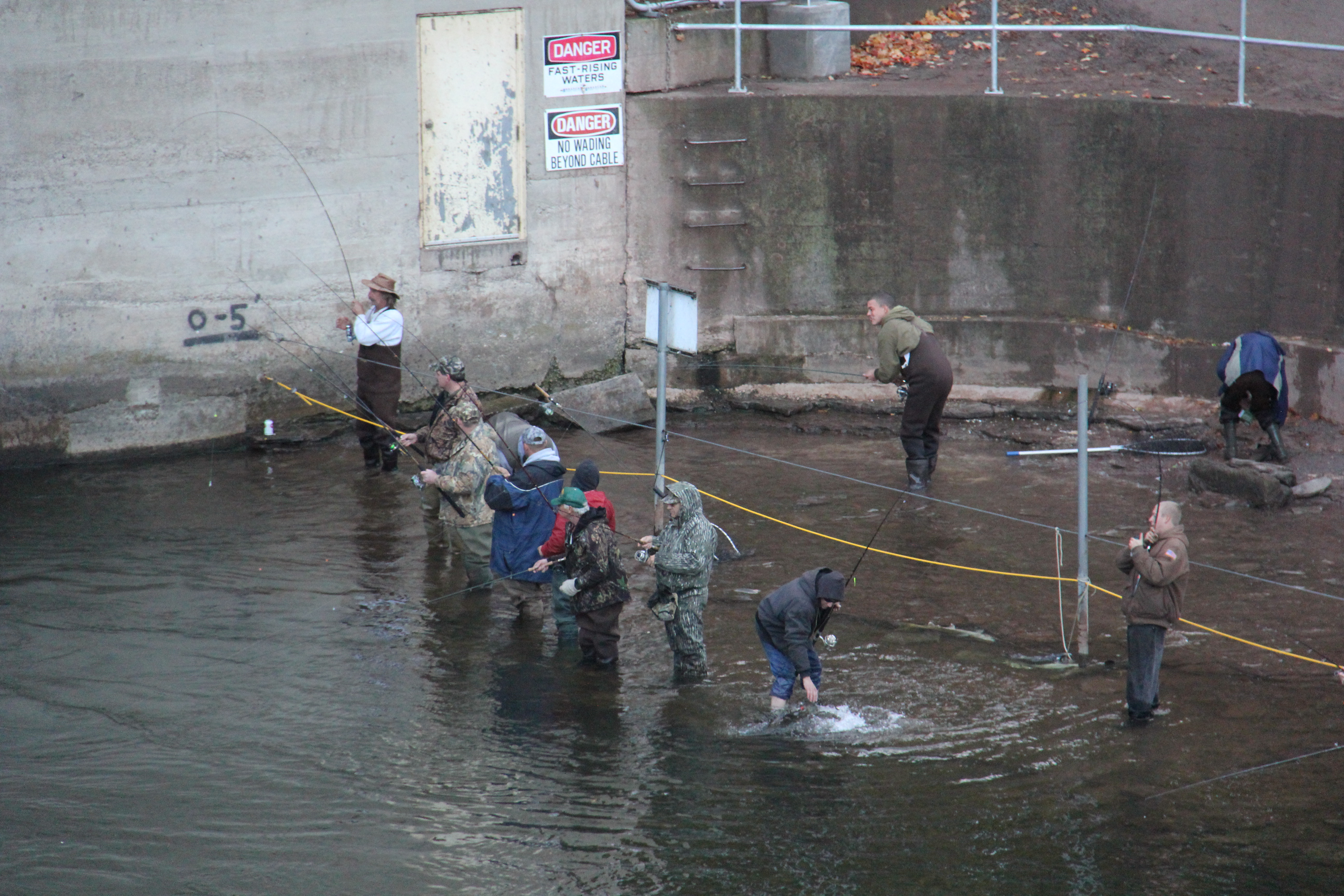

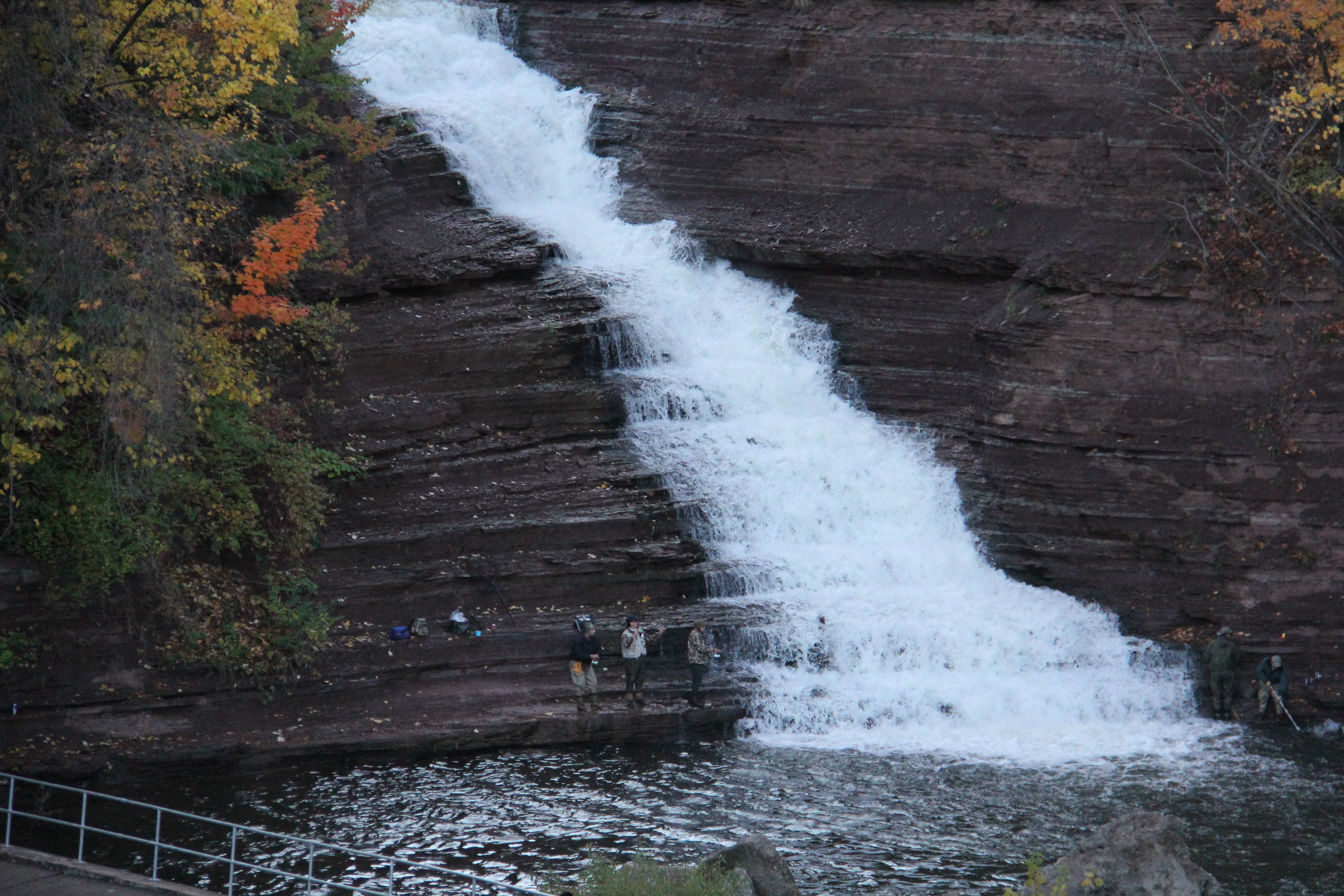

== Communities and locations in Carlton ==
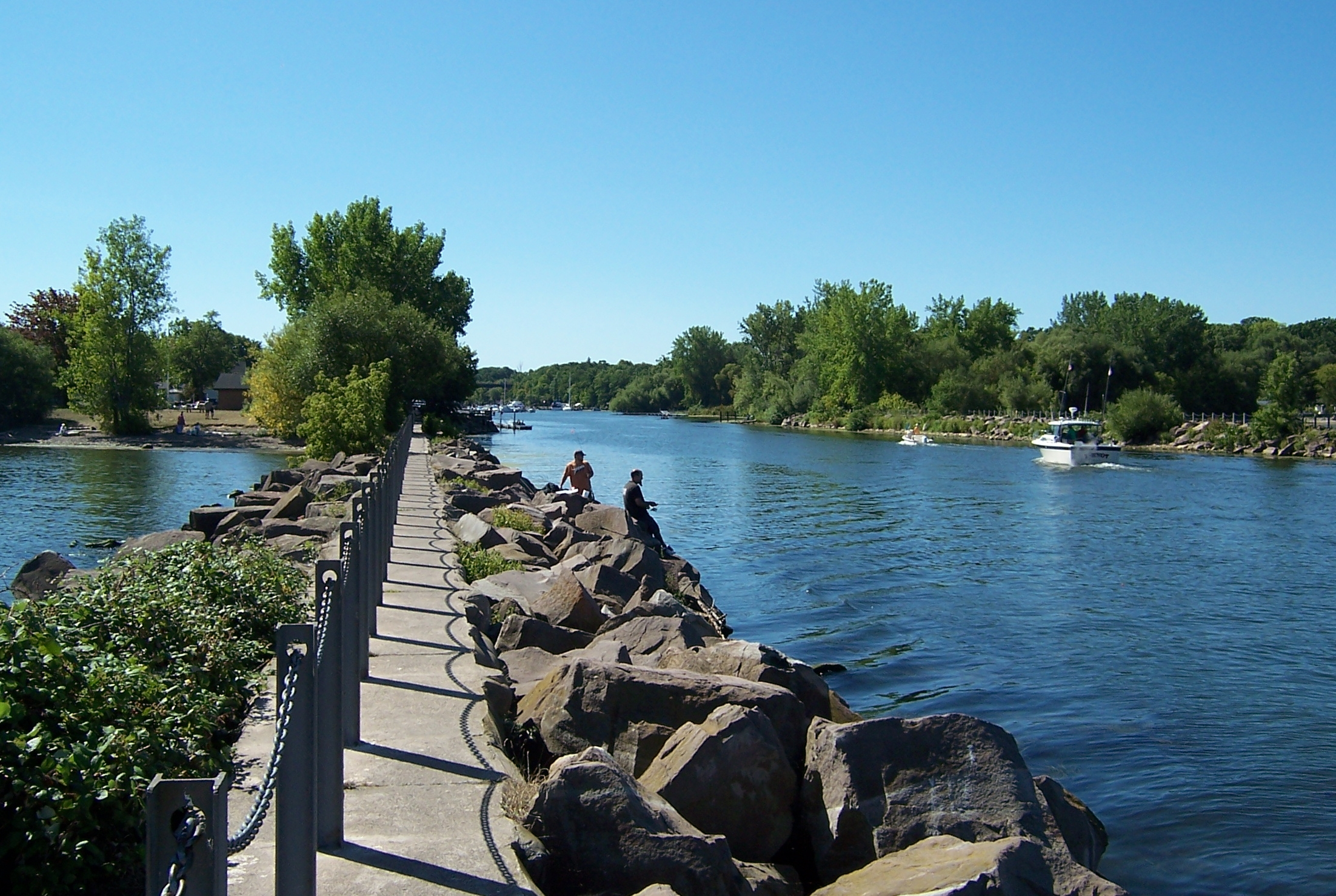
The Oak Orchard River at Point Breeze.

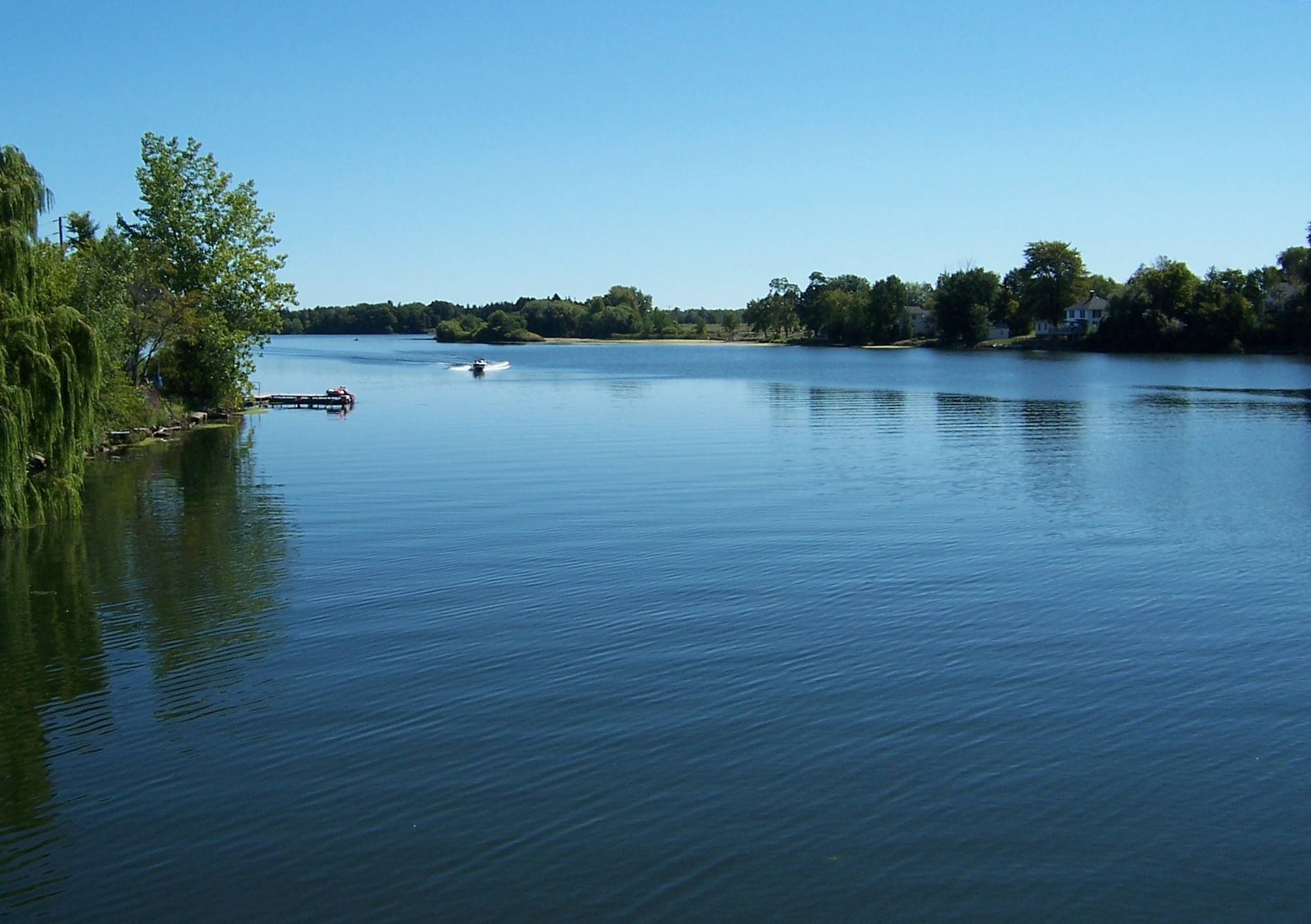
Lake Alice, between Waterport (right) and Waterport Station (left).

- Ashwood – A location on the border with the Town of Yates.
- Baldwin Corner – A hamlet north of Carlton on NY-98.
- Brighton Cliff – A location on the shore of Lake Ontario.
- The Bridges – A location at the Oak Orchard River and Marsh Creek, also known as "Three Bridges", referring to the bridges that carry Routes NY-98 and NY-18 over the river. The Bridges is south of Point Breeze.
- Carlton Station (or Carlton) – This hamlet is the location of the town government and is located on NY-98.
- Jones Beach – A lakeside hamlet in the northeast part of the town.
- Kent – A hamlet, also known as "East Carlton" or "Brice Station", located on the border with the Town of Kendall.
- Kenyonville – A hamlet on the north side of the Oak Orchard River.
- Kuckville – A hamlet, also known as "West Carlton" and named after George Kuck, is in the northwest part of the town.
- Lakeside Park – A hamlet on the shore of Lake Ontario.
- Lakeside Beach State Park – A state park on the shore of Lake Ontario. It is the western terminus of the Lake Ontario State Parkway.
- Oak Orchard State Marine Park – A state park located on the Lake Ontario shore.
- Oak Orchard On The Lake – A hamlet just west of the Oak Orchard River first settled as a summer resort community in about 1883.
- Point Breeze – A hamlet on Lake Ontario, adjacent to the Oak Orchard River and the Oak Orchard State Marine Park. The village is at the northern terminus of NY-98.
- Rock Ledge Beach – A hamlet on the east side of Lakeside Beach State Park.
- Sawyer – A hamlet, also known as "Curtis Corners," on NY-18 in the eastern part of the town.
- Sunset Beach – A location on the shore of Lake Ontario.
- Toms Landing – A hamlet adjacent to the Oak Orchard River.
- Waterport – A hamlet on NY-279, where Otter Creek joins the Oak Orchard River, which reaches its maximum width. Waterport is in the western part of the town and on the south side of the river. It's also the location of the post office that serves most of the town of Carlton.
- Waterport Reservoir – A reservoir located by the hamlet of Waterport.
- Waterport Station – A location on the north side of the Oak Orchard River, north of Waterport on NY-279.
