= Murray, New York =

Town in Orleans County, New York

- Town
- Location in Orleans County and the state of New York.

- Location of New York in the United States
- Coordinates: 43°14′59″N 78°3′29″W
- Country: United States
- State: New York
- County: Orleans

Area
  - Total: 31.10 sq mi (80.55 km^{2})
  - Land: 31.06 sq mi (80.44 km^{2})
  - Water: 0.039 sq mi (0.10 km^{2})
- Elevation: 520 ft (160 m)

Population (2010)
  - Total: 4,988
  - Estimate (2016): 4,750
  - Density: 152.9/sq mi (59.05/km^{2})
- Time zone: UTC-5 (Eastern (EST))
  - Summer (DST): UTC-4 (EDT)
- FIPS code: 36-49286
- GNIS feature ID: 0979246

Murray is a town in Orleans County, New York, United States. The population was 6,259 at the 2000 census.

The Town of Murray is on the east border of the county, northwest of the City of Rochester.

== History ==
Murray was first settled c. 1809. The Town of Murray was established in 1808 from the town of Northampton before the formation of Orleans County, while still part of Genesee County. Later, Murray was reduced by the creation of new towns: Sweden (1813, now in Monroe County), Clarkson (1819, now in Monroe County), Kendall (1837), and Holley (1850).

== Geography ==
According to the United States Census Bureau, the town has a total area of 31.1 square miles (81 km^{2}), of which 31.0 square miles (80 km^{2}) is land and 0.1 square miles (0.26 km^{2}) (0.19%) is water.

The eastern boundary is shared with the Town of Clarkson in Monroe County, marked by New York State Route 272.

The Erie Canal passes through the town, along with New York State Route 31, New York State Route 104 (Ridge Road) and New York State Route 387.

== Demographics ==
Historical population
Census	Pop.	Note	%±
1820	1,561		—
1830	3,138		101.0%
1840	2,675		−14.8%
1850	2,520		−5.8%
1860	2,612		3.7%
1870	2,522		−3.4%
1880	2,812		11.5%
1890	3,465		23.2%
1900	3,656		5.5%
1910	3,969		8.6%
1920	3,390		−14.6%
1930	3,251		−4.1%
1940	2,764		−15.0%
1950	3,200		15.8%
1960	3,767		17.7%
1970	4,638		23.1%
1980	4,754		2.5%
1990	4,921		3.5%
2000	4,892		−0.6%
2010	4,988		2.0%
2016 (est.)	4,750		−4.8%
U.S. Decennial Census

As of the census of 2000, there were 6,259 people, 1,886 households, and 1,308 families residing in the town. The population density was 201.6 inhabitants per square mile (77.8/km^{2}). There were 2,014 housing units at an average density of 64.9 per square mile (25.1/km^{2}). The racial makeup of the town was 83.64% White, 14.63% African American, 0.29% Native American, 0.13% Asian, 0.66% from other races, and 0.66% from two or more races. Hispanic or Latino of any race were 6.29% of the population.

There were 1,886 households, out of which 36.5% had children under the age of 18 living with them, 52.2% were married couples living together, 11.7% had a female householder with no husband present, and 30.6% were non-families. 24.0% of all households were made up of individuals, and 8.6% had someone living alone who was 65 years of age or older. The average household size was 2.59 and the average family size was 3.07.

In the town, the population was spread out, with 22.4% under the age of 18, 9.3% from 18 to 24, 40.5% from 25 to 44, 19.8% from 45 to 64, and 8.0% who were 65 years of age or older. The median age was 35 years. For every 100 females, there were 64.6 males. For every 100 females age 18 and over, there were 56.0 males.

The median income for a household in the town was $38,672, and the median income for a family was $45,184. Males had a median income of $32,795 versus $26,113 for females. The per capita income for the town was $14,620. About 4.2% of families and 6.9% of the population were below the poverty line, including 9.5% of those under age 18 and 5.1% of those age 65 or over.

== Notable people ==
- Pitts Ellis, Wisconsin legislator, was born in Murray.
- Jacob Hinds, former Canal Commissioner for New York State

== Communities and locations in Murray ==
- Holley - The Village of Holley, on the Erie Canal, is in the southeast part of the town.
- Fancher – A community located around the intersection of Routes NY-387 and NY-31 in the western part of the town.
- Hindsburg (also spelled Hinsburg, Hinsberg, Hindsburgh, Hindsville) – A location on the west town line.
- McCargo Lake – A small lake by the west town line.
- Murray – The hamlet of Murray is on Ridge Road (NY-104).
- Brockville – A hamlet north of Fancher on NY-387.
- Hulberton – A hamlet east of Fancher by the Erie Canal.
