= Benjamin Gates =

Benjamin Gates may refer to:

- Benjamin Franklin Gates, fictional character and protagonist of the National Treasure franchise
- Benjamin Gates (Vermont politician) (1873–1943), Vermont attorney
- Benjamin Franklin Gates (1801–1881), early settler of the town of Barre, New York, and first owner of the now-historic Benjamin Franklin Gates House
