= Senator Bogadus =

Senator Bogadus may refer to:

- Charles Bogardus (1841–1929), Illinois State Senate
- Robert Bogardus (1771–1841), New York State Senate
