= Cobblestone Inn =

- U.S. National Register of Historic Places
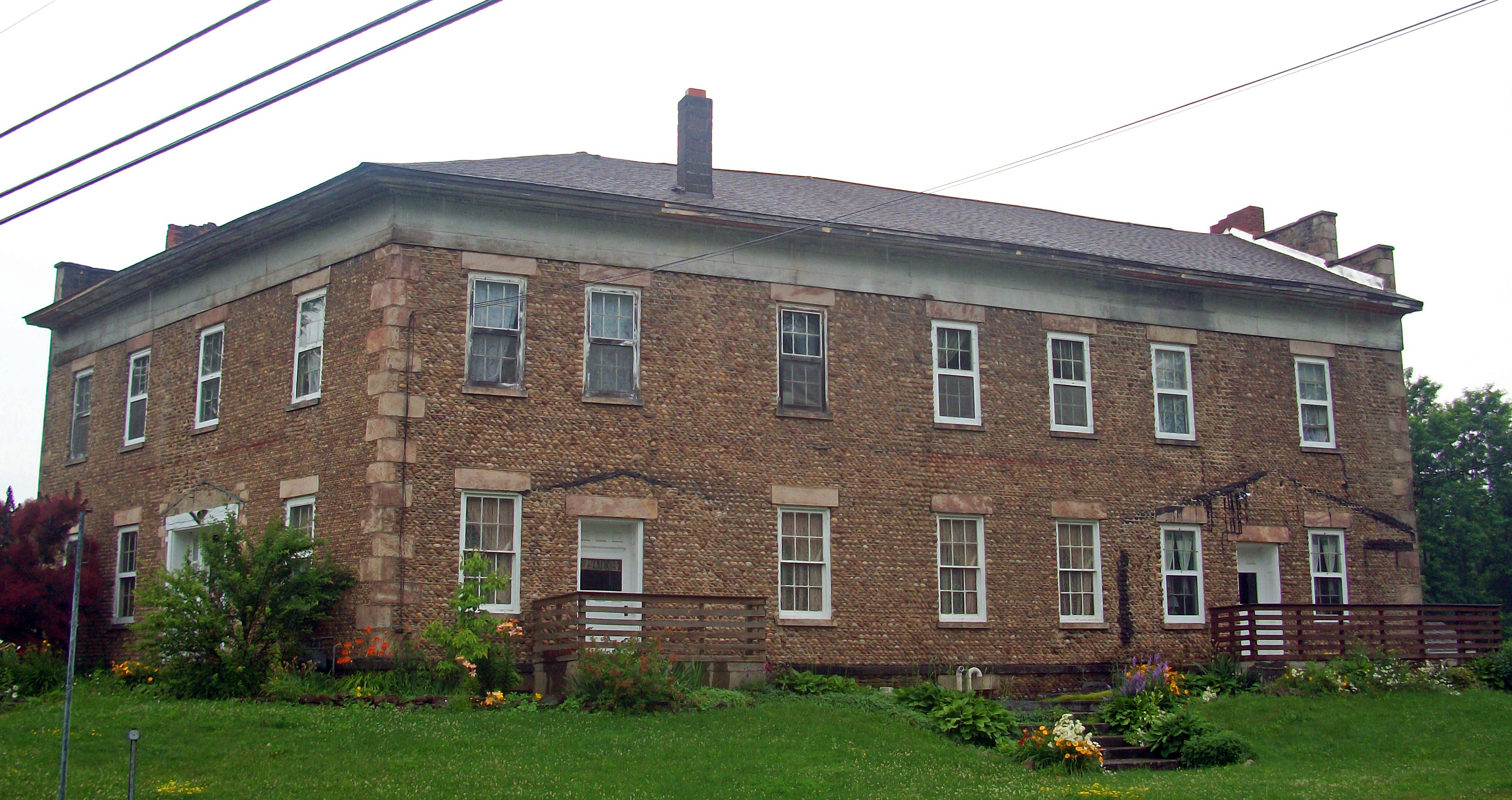
- East elevation and south profile, 2010

- Location within New York Location within the United States
- Location: Oak-Orchard-on-the-Ridge, NY
- Nearest city: Lockport
- Coordinates: 43°16′28″N 78°19′59″W
- Area: 1.3 acres (5,300 m^{2})
- Architectural style: Greek Revival
- MPS: Cobblestone Architecture of New York State MPS
- NRHP reference No.: 07000755
- Added to NRHP: July 24, 2007

The Cobblestone Inn is located along Ridge Road (state highway NY 104) in Oak-Orchard-on-the-Ridge, an unincorporated hamlet in the Town of Ridgeway, New York, United States. It is a cobblestone building dating to the 1830s.

At the time of its construction, it was a stagecoach stop on the busy east–west route paralleling the Lake Ontario shoreline. It remained in use as an inn into the mid-20th century despite the loss of stagecoach traffic to the railroads in the decades after its construction. It is believed to be the largest cobblestone building in the state. In 2007 it was listed on the National Register of Historic Places.

== Building ==
The inn is located on the northwest corner of the junction of Route 104 and Oak Orchard River Road (Orleans County Route 53). It is roughly 800 feet (240 m) west of where the highway crosses the Oak Orchard River, and thus the ground around it slopes gently eastward. The building itself is on a 1.3-acre (5,300 m^{2}) graded lot, elevating it slightly above the intersection. There are houses to the west along either side of the road and woods to the east as it slopes to the river.

The building itself is a two-story L-shaped structure seven bays on the long leg, paralleling Oak Orchard River Road, and four on the short. It is faced in cobblestones, five rows per Medina sandstone quoin, with a hipped roof pierced by a single central brick chimney with stepped parapet walls at the north and west ends. There is a wide plain frieze below the overhanging eaves. Besides the quoins, the sills, lintels, and water table are all sandstone as well. On the east side are two modern wooden porches at entrances along that wall. There is visible evidence of the roofs that once sheltered both.

From the main entrance on the south wall, a long central entrance hall runs north to a long four-bay room and then ends in a group of service-related rooms. The second floor has, in addition to its small guest rooms, a similar room in that space. The interior retains much of its original plaster and Greek Revival woodwork. The main staircase has its original stringers, newels and balustrade.

== History ==
The arrangement of the cobblestone facing is consistent with the middle period of the style, 1836–1845. The Inn did a lot of business on a competitive stage route. It is believed to be the largest cobblestone residence in North America. Traffic on the stage routes declined first with the opening of the Erie Canal to the south, and then the rise of the railroads in the mid-19th century. The Inn was used not just as a travelers rest with bar and dining but as a meeting place for the town and a post office. Its business revived in the days of automobile tourism in the 1920s in that capacity. In the mid-20th century, that business declined when the New York State Thruway was built to the south in Genesee County. The Inn was run as a guest house and restaurant and antique shop until 2010 then reused as a residence. It has remained in that use, with no alterations, since then.

The interior layout with the large community room on the first floor which was used for town meetings, a post office for Oak Orchard until the early 1900s and a dining area. The Inn contained 5 rooms on the main floor. One very large dining room/guest retreat and at one time the post office/grocery store. A bar which dated back to its origin is located on the west side. A small tellers room and large kitchen with servants' quarters off the kitchen. There is a restroom on the first floor which was originally a stairway to the cellar where food was prepared in the early 1800s. Remains of the bake oven still exist. A root cellar area led to a tunnel under Oak River Rd to the east. It is suspected to have been used to transport liquor, guns and/or runaway slaves. The tunnel collapsed in the 1950s and was filled in. Then leading to the second floor are two staircases one front for guests, leading to originally 7 guest rooms. The other off the kitchen to the caretaker quarters. The large caretakers' room has a separate small room for children. A door on the second floor separated the guests from the caretakers. It opened to a wide hall with 3 rooms, then around the corner to another 4 bedrooms. There is a small space you can enter only from the attic to the second floor where rumors say slaves were hidden. There was very old graffiti found on the walls and saved under plexiglass. The original wallpaper in some rooms had hand-applied gold leaf on the border. There are samples of the wallpapers found in the house now located at the Cobblestone Museum, in Albion, NY. along with other items from the history of this wonderful place.

== See also ==
- National Register of Historic Places listings in Orleans County, New York

The Dead Files, Drawn to Evil, episode season 7 episode 13.
