= Servoss House =

Historic house in New York, United States

- U.S. National Register of Historic Places
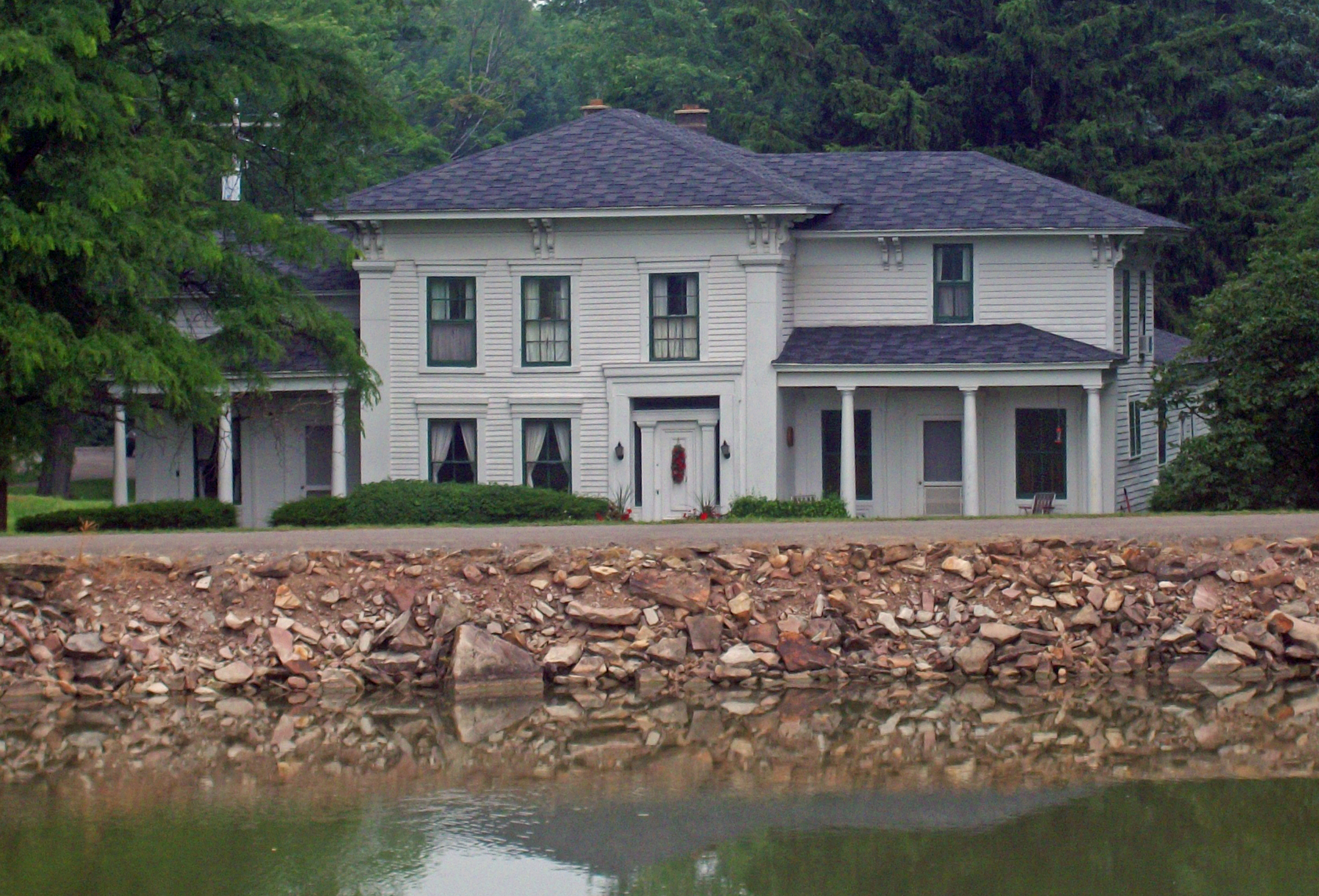
- South elevation and partial east profile from NY 31E across canal, 2010

- Location within New York Location within the United States
- Location: Town of Ridgeway, NY
- Nearest city: Lockport
- Coordinates: 43°13′0″N 78°25′51″W
- Area: 10 acres (4 ha)
- Built: 1830
- Architectural style: Greek Revival
- NRHP reference No.: 08000104
- Added to NRHP: February 28, 2008

The Servoss House is a located on Fruit Avenue (Orleans County Route 41) in the town of Ridgeway, New York, United States, near Medina. It is a Greek Revival style home built between 1830 and 1833 alongside the Erie Canal.

It has an unusual structural system consisting of stacked horizontal wooden planks, similar to that used by the contemporaneous Benjamin Franklin Gates House in Barre. It remains mostly intact today. In 2008 it was listed on the National Register of Historic Places.

== Buildings and grounds ==
The house is located on a 10-acre (4 ha) lot on the east side of Fruit where it bends westward at the canal and becomes Dublin Road. It is roughly one mile (1.6 km) west of Medina, midway between the village and the Niagara County line. To the south of the house, on an embankment along the north bank of the canal, is the Canal Trailway, a public path for pedestrians and bicyclists on the canal's former towpath. Across the canal is Telegraph Road (NY 31E), the main route between Medina and Middleport to the west. Other houses are across Fruit Avenue, slightly to the north.

Around the house are mature maple and locust trees. There are large lawns in front and back; a driveway leads back to Fruit from the north (rear) of the house. In the woods to the northeast is an old smokehouse, considered a contributing resource to the house's historic character. The remainder of the property is wooded, with pines joining the hardwoods. Most of the surrounding area is wooded, giving way to worked fields to the north and east.

The house itself has a two-story, three-bay main block with wings on either side. All sections are sided in clapboard and have asphalt roofs. The main block and two-story east wing have hipped roofs; the one-and-a-half-story west wing is gabled. A small gabled garage wing projects north from the east wing.

Its structural system is referred to variously as horizontal-plank frame, stacked plank or plank-to-plank. The clapboard is affixed to layers of planks stacked solid. Usually 2-by-6-inch (5.1 by 15.2 cm) planks were used, staggered to form a plaster key (fastening). They are spiked or pegged together at the corners, windows, doors and other spaces.

At the corners of the south (front) facade, wooden Doric pilasters, their capitals starting at the architrave line created by the simple wooden lintels on the second-story windows, frame the building. Above the windows is a wide frieze where paired brackets support overhanging eaves.

Both wings have hipped-roof full-length porches. They are supported by hand-turned Doric columns with molded capitals. The east wing roofline is also bracketed.

The main entrance is in the easternmost of the three bays. It is surrounded by a paneled enframement with an eared entablature that goes to the sill of the window above. Inside two pilasters frame the door and its long vertical sidelights. Above their decorated crosspiece is a transom.

The door opens into the main block's central hallway. To its south is the main stair with a simple handrail and balustrade. Two large parlors are to the west. The west wing's first floor is given over to the living room; the east is the kitchen wing. On the second story are four bedrooms and a bathroom. The west wing's bedroom has a vaulted ceiling.

Wide plank pine floors are used all over the house. All original finishes are of carved cucumber tree wood. The door and window surrounds are simple molded shouldered architraves and the baseboards are wide molded planks.

== History ==
Christopher Servoss came west with his family from Montgomery County in the early 1820s to capitalize on the opportunities created by the canal. He bought 235 acres (95 ha) from the Holland Land Company, including the current parcel, and built a log cabin. In 1830, with the help of carpenters and masons who had worked on the canal, he began building the house for him, his family and his second wife. It was finished by 1833.

Why they used the unusual horizontal-plank system, generally found elsewhere in the Northeast and in neighboring areas of Canada, is not known. It was believed to retain heat better and protect against wind gusts in the harsh winters the region was known for. Since they required less skill and more material to build than regular timber frame houses, they may have been well-suited for newly settled areas where skilled carpenters and joiners were not available but where wood and the sawmills to process it were abundant. Combinations of both these theories may have motivated the Servosses. The direct access to lumber in large quantities via the canal may have made it even more economical.

For over a hundred years the house remained with Servoss's descendants. Very few alterations were made, although the lot was gradually subdivided and sold off. In 1940, it was sold out of the family. After several other owners, it passed in 1952 to its present owners, who have been active in restoring and preserving it.

== See also ==
- National Register of Historic Places listings in Orleans County, New York
