= Barre Center, New York =

Hamlet in New York, United States

Coordinates: 43°11′10″N 78°11′39″W

Barre Center is a hamlet in the town of Barre in Orleans County, New York, United States.

The Skinner-Tinkham House was listed on the National Register of Historic Places in 2004.
