= John Caldwell (Michigan representative) =

American politician (1849–1916)

John Caldwell Jr.
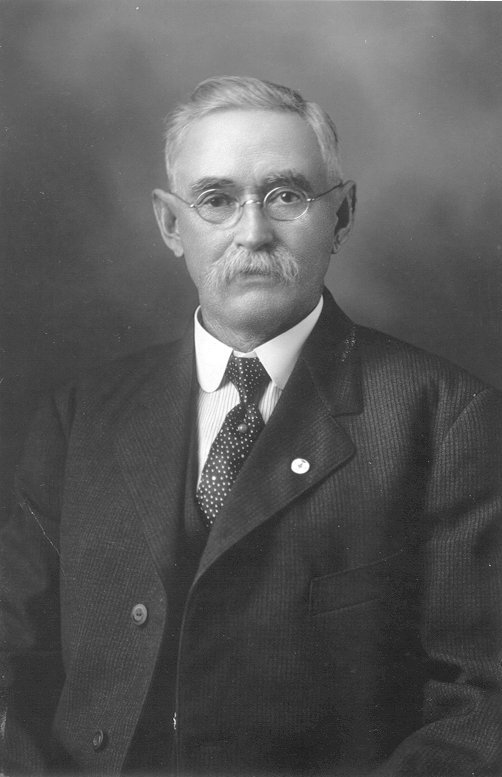
- Born: 4 July 1849; Ridgeway, New York
- Died: 7 March 1916 (aged 66); Manton, Michigan
- Education: Litchfield School
- Occupations: Farmer, timberman, state representative
- Political party: Republican
- Parent(s): John and Jane Caldwell

John Caldwell Jr. (4 July 1849 – 7 March 1916) was a nineteenth-century farmer and timber man of northern Michigan, associated with Missaukee County, Michigan. He was employed for several years by the Mitchell Brothers Company, a land agent firm in several states, dealing with large tracts of timber for making lumber. He homesteaded 100 acres, and had a diversified system of farming that proved successful.

Caldwell was Republican member of the Michigan State House of Representatives for two terms, from 1897 through 1900. He represented the Wexford district, comprising the counties of Wexford, Missaukee and Clare, and held several county and town positions in local government.

== Early life ==
Caldwell's parents, John Caldwell Sr. and Jane (Thompson) Caldwell, immigrated from Ireland and arrived in the state of New York in the early part of the nineteenth century. They were married in 1840. John Caldwell was born in Orleans County, New York, on July 4, 1849. The family moved in 1856 to Litchfield Township, in Hillsdale County, Michigan, where Caldwell worked on the family farm. As a teenager, he started working in the woods of Tuscola County.

Caldwell was employed by the Mitchell Brothers Company, buying and selling timber lands.

== Mid life ==
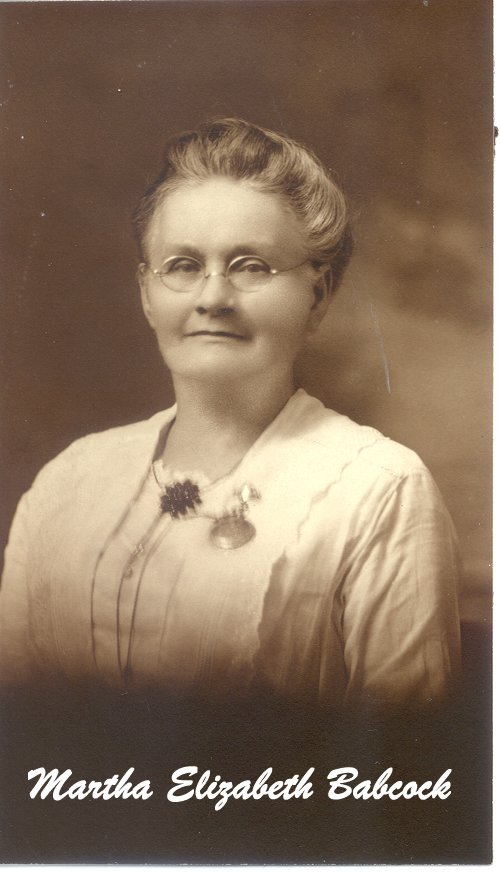
Caldwell's wife

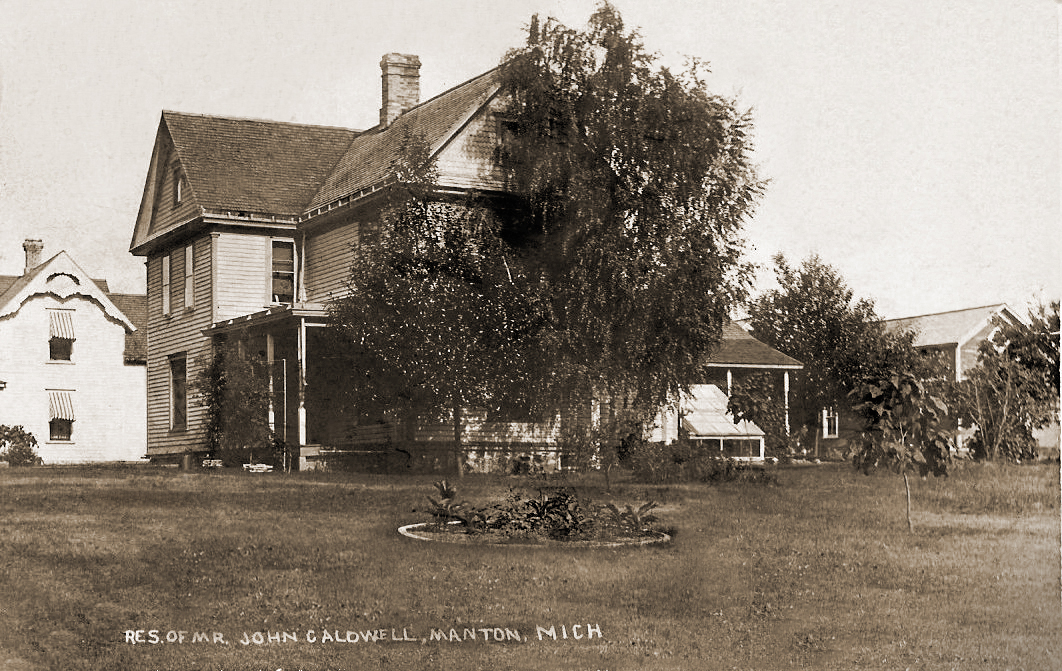
Caldwell home at 206 Main Street in Manton, Michigan, circa 1913

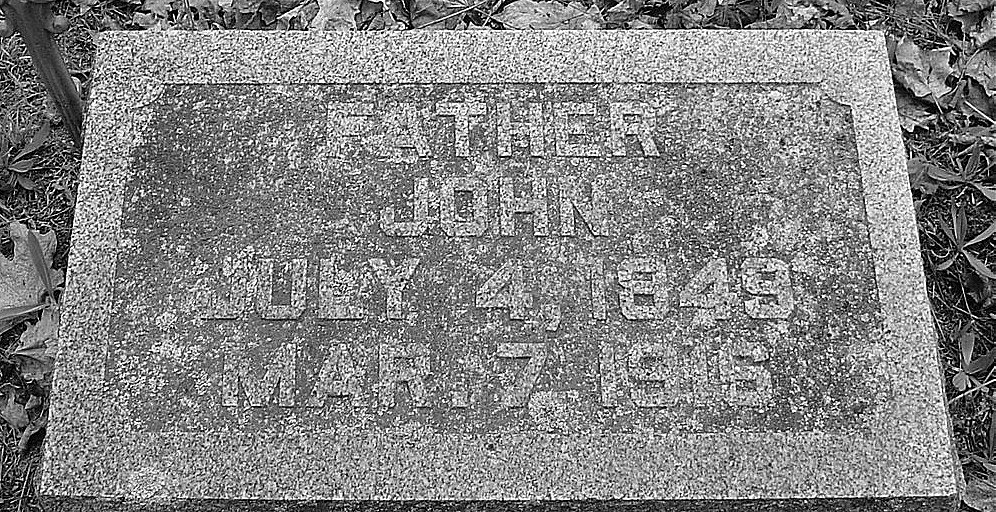
John Caldwell's tombstone

In 1875, Caldwell obtained a homestead. He later purchased an adjacent 40 acres (160,000 m^{2}) of land. Caldwell and his older brother Thomas, were some of the earliest settlers in Missaukee County.

Caldwell was a member of National Grange of the Order of Patrons of Husbandry and had a successful diversified system of farming.

== Political career ==
In 1897, Caldwell was elected to the Michigan House of Representatives, on the Republican ticket, representing Wexford County, Missaukee County and Clare County. Two years later, he was reelected to the legislature.

Caldwell took an interest in public matters, and served Caldwell Township as highway commissioner, township clerk, township treasurer, justice of the peace, and township supervisor. He served as county treasurer and supervisor of Missaukee County.

== Sources ==
- Bingham, Stephen D. (1924). Michigan Biographies, Including Members of Congress, Elective State Officers, Justices of the Supreme Court, Volume 1. Michigana historical commission.
- Bowen, B. F. (1905). Biographical History of Northern Michigan containing Biographies of Prominent Citizens. Chicago, Illinois: Brookhaven Press.

Preceded by H Frank Campbell	Michigan State Representative of District of Wexford for Wexford, Missaukee and Clare Counties; 1897– 1900	Succeeded by Dennis Orville
