= Benjamin Franklin Gates House =

Historic house in New York, United States

- U.S. National Register of Historic Places
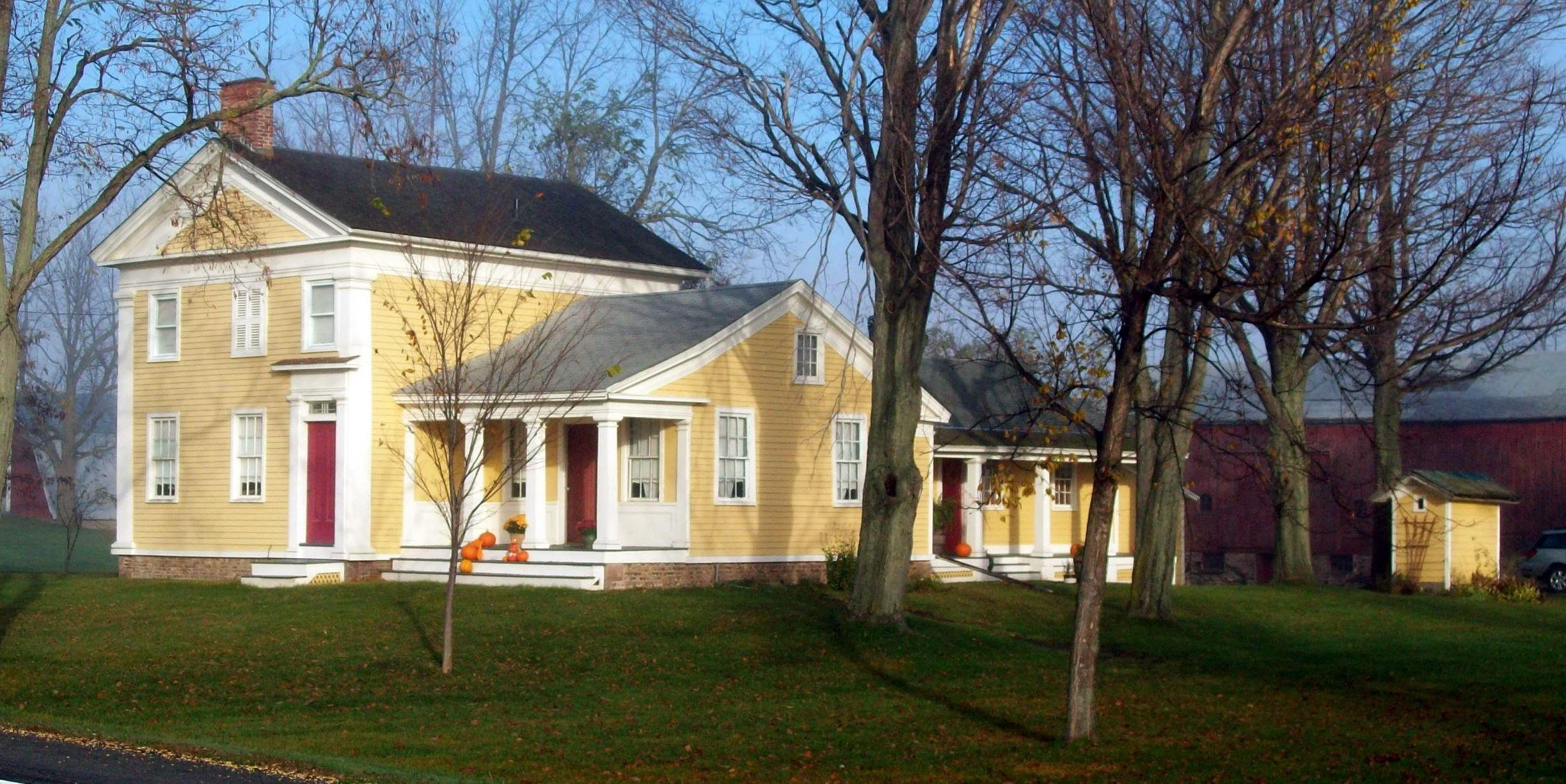
- South elevation, east profile and privy, 2010

- Location within New York Location within the United States
- Location: Barre, NY
- Nearest city: Batavia
- Coordinates: 43°12′10″N 78°16′43″W
- Area: 29 acres (12 ha)
- Built: 1830
- Architectural style: Greek Revival
- NRHP reference No.: 09000378
- Added to NRHP: June 4, 2009

The Benjamin Franklin Gates House is an historic home and farm complex located on Lee Road (New York State Route 31A) in Barre, New York, United States. It is centered on a Greek Revival house built in the 1830s using the unusual stacked-plank structural system. The accompanying barn and privy are also included in the listing.

Gates, the original owner, was a pioneer in the settlement of Barre who established the first tannery in the town and later became one of its most prominent early citizens. The property has remained virtually unchanged since his ownership. After new owners restored it, it was listed on the National Register of Historic Places in 2009. It is the second property listed in Barre after the Skinner-Tinkham House in the hamlet of Barre Center, and the second stacked-plank house listed in Orleans County after the Servoss House.

== Buildings and grounds ==
The farm is located on the north side of the road, just east of where Mix Road intersects from the south. The house and other structures are located near the front of the 29-acre (12 ha) property; seven acres (2.8 ha) in the rear are currently under cultivation. Trees planted in the last two decades, including 15 disease-resistant American elms, mark the property lines, along with some mature black walnuts and sugar maples.

Terrain is mostly level. The surrounding area is rural, with farmland predominating. Some woodlots and cellular phone towers are visible in the distance. Nearby buildings along the road are other farmsteads, most of their buildings also dating to the 19th century. The nearest large settlements are the villages of Albion to the east-northeast and Medina to the west-northwest, both about 4 miles (6.4 km) distant.

=== House ===
The house itself has a main section with wings to the north and east. A fieldstone foundation has cobblestone facing, protruding mortar V-joints and sandstone quoinss. Atop it rest stacks of one-inch–thick (2.5-cm) vertical wooden planks nailed together creating load-bearing walls. Plaster was applied to the interior surface; the exterior is faced in clapboard. The two-story, three-bay main block is topped with a gabled roof, shingled in cedar, from which a brick chimney protrudes at the south (front) end.

On the east is a side-gabled one-story wing with full-width porch. The north wing projects from the rear of the east wing and the house's east rear. It, too, is side-gabled with a full-width porch facing east. It has the house's other chimney as well.

The south facade of the main block has two original six-over-six double-hung sash windows in the two western bays. The main entrance is located in the east bay. Greek Revival elements present include the wide corner pilasters and plain frieze topped by cornice at the roofline, creating a pediment with heavy entablature at the gable field. The porches are supported by square wooden columns, echoed by pilasters along the facades. All entrances can be reached by two wooden steps.

A simple wooden surround frames the main entrance, topped by a transom. It opens into a side hall that leads to parlors on the west and (in the wing) on the east. Behind the parlor is the library. Both parlors have Greek Revival interior decorations—atticurge architraves on the east and corner blocks on the west, where the baseboard forms a plinth block at the floor. A set of stairs near the back leads to the bedrooms upstairs.

In the north wing are the kitchen and dining room. Below it is crawl space with a dirt floor. The rest of the house has a full basement. Some interior walls are stacked-plank as well. The non–load-bearing walls are of vertical plank surfaced with split lath and plaster.

=== Outbuildings ===
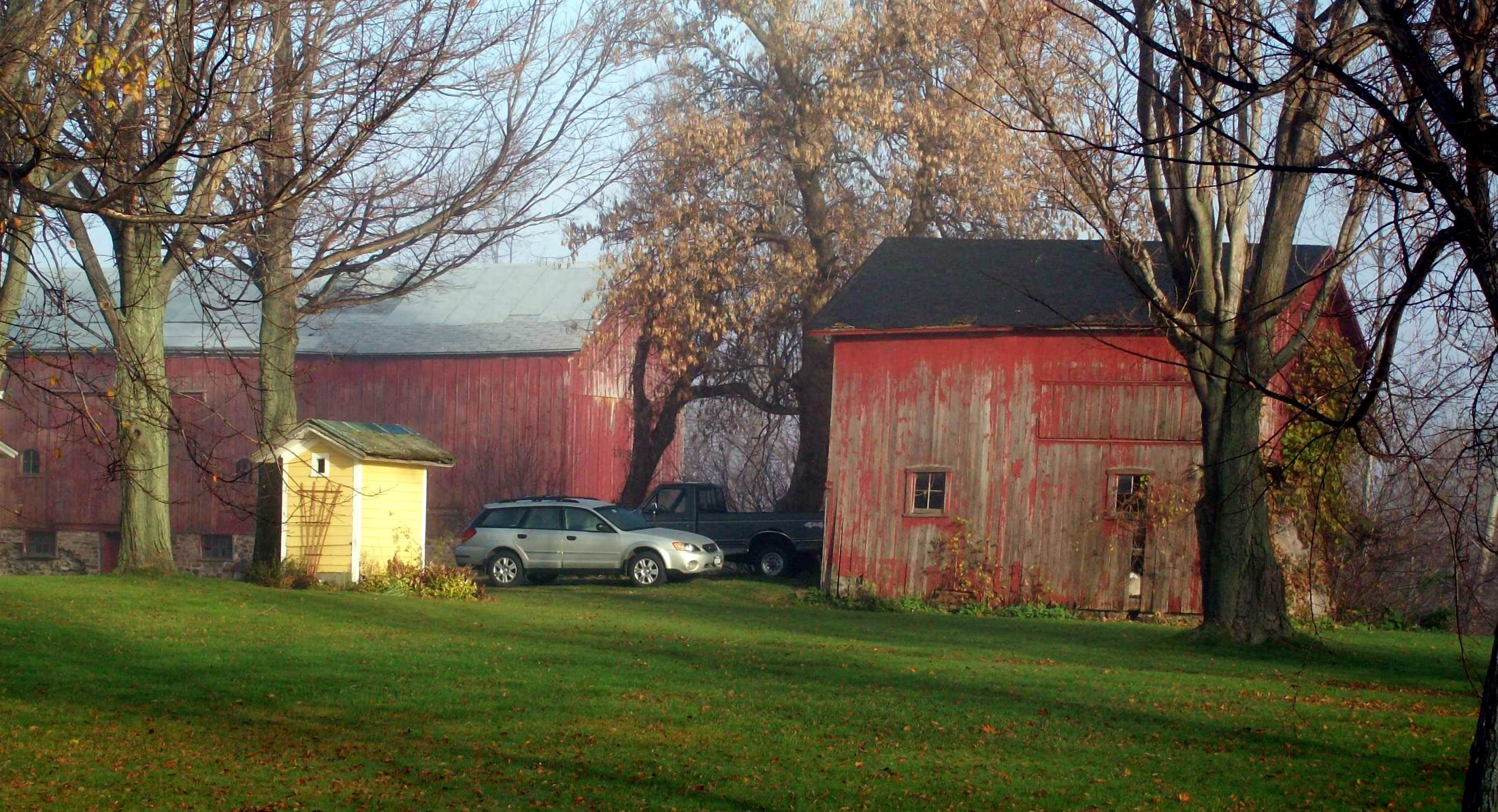
Barn and carriage house

Just to the northeast are the outbuildings. The largest is a gabled barn of hand-hewn post-and-beam on a fieldstone foundation with lime mortar. It is sided in board with ogee-shaped battens. Sliding doors at either end lead to an interior with an earthen ramp to the second level and a loft at the west end on the third level.

The smaller carriage barn on the east is similar to the barn. It is a sawn post-and-beam building on a fieldstone foundation with tongue-and-groove vertical siding and sliding doors at each gabled end. Inside a stairway leads to the second floor. The smaller privy between the house and barns is more like the former, clapboard-sided with a beaded plank door on an original hand-wrought Suffolk latch. Its walls are sided with plaster on accordion lath.

== History ==
Gates, the descendant of English colonists who had moved from Massachusetts to Ontario County, in turn moved to Barre around 1830. His initial purchase of 10 acres (4.0 ha) was enlarged with 19 acres (7.7 ha) the following year, creating the present lot. The house was built around that time. Its stacked-plank structural system may have been employed due to the surplus of wood from land being cleared at the time and the dearth of skilled carpenters in the area.

In addition to farming the small parcel, he went into the tanning business. From a single vat hollowed out of a log, by 1852 he had several employees and had built a facility for the work. He sold the house for $3,200 ($124,000 in contemporary dollars) to William Harrison Gates in 1853. After another sale in 1865, the tannery burned down sometime before 1874; an account from 1879 says that only a fragment of a foundation wall remained at that time.

Alterations to the house have been generally minimal and incremental. The kitchen floor was raised 7 inches (180 mm) in the 1840s to bring it level with the dining room. A century later, the original chimney was removed.

After the kitchen was remodeled in 1986, the current owners made some major renovations in the early 2000s. Two bathrooms were added, and on the exterior the north wing's porch was added. The original chimney and louvered shutters were replicated. All were done with care to not disrupt the house's overall appearance.
