= Oak Orchard, New York =

Hamlet in New York, United States

Coordinates: 43°16′27″N 78°19′57″W

Oak Orchard, also known as Oak Orchard on-the-Ridge, is a hamlet in the town of Ridgeway in Orleans County, New York, United States.

The Cobblestone Inn was listed on the National Register of Historic Places in 2007.
