= Ridgeway, New York =

- Town
- Location in Orleans County and the state of New York.

- Location of New York in the United States
- Coordinates: 43°14′25″N 78°23′14″W
- Country: United States
- State: New York
- County: Orleans

Area
  - Total: 50.24 sq mi (130.13 km^{2})
  - Land: 50.03 sq mi (129.57 km^{2})
  - Water: 0.22 sq mi (0.56 km^{2})
- Elevation: 410 ft (125 m)

Population (2010)
  - Total: 6,780
  - Estimate (2016): 6,487
  - Density: 129.7/sq mi (50.07/km^{2})
- Time zone: UTC-5 (Eastern (EST))
  - Summer (DST): UTC-4 (EDT)
- FIPS code: 36-61742
- GNIS feature ID: 0979422

Ridgeway is a town in Orleans County, New York, United States. The population was 6,886 at the 2000 census. The name of the town is derived from "Ridge Road," an important highway in the 19th century.

The Town of Ridgeway is on the western border of the county, which is bordered to the north by Lake Ontario.

== History ==
This area was settled after the American Revolutionary War largely by migrants from New England and eastern New York state, after the Seneca Nation, of the Haudenosaunee, or Six Nations ceded it in the Treaty of Big Tree, in 1797. The Seneca controlled this area at the time of the influx of White Americans but until the period of 1644–1647, it was the realm of The Wenro & Neuter People. Much of the area was purchased by Dutch speculators, known as the Holland Land Company, in 1792–1793.

The Town of Ridgeway was formed from Batavia in 1812, in the period of the War of 1812, when Britain and the United States fought over the border with Canada. In 1818, part of the town was used to create the new Town of Shelby. Orleans County was formed by the State Legislature in 1825.

In 1823, Ebenezer Mix was hired to survey and lay out the future village of Medina, the northern portion of which lies within Ridgeway.

Shelby and Ridgeway have one town court to serve both towns. Additionally, both towns share an assessor.

The Servoss House was listed on the National Register of Historic Places in 2008.

== Geography ==
According to the United States Census Bureau, the town has a total area of 50.3 square miles (130 km^{2}), of which 50.0 square miles (129 km^{2}) is land and 0.2 square miles (0.52 km^{2}) (0.46%) is water.

The town is bordered by the Town of Hartland to the west in Niagara County. New York State Route 269 (County Line Road) partly defines this border.

New York State Route 63 (Lyndonville Road) and New York State Route 104 (Ridge Road) intersect in the western part of the town. New York State Route 31E passes through the southeast part of Ridgeway.

The Oak Orchard River flows through the town toward Lake Ontario to the north.

== Demographics ==
Historical population
Census	Pop.	Note	%±
1820	1,496		—
1830	1,939		29.6%
1840	3,554		83.3%
1850	4,591		29.2%
1860	4,706		2.5%
1870	5,096		8.3%
1880	5,495		7.8%
1890	5,790		5.4%
1900	5,898		1.9%
1910	6,538		10.9%
1920	5,969		−8.7%
1930	6,068		1.7%
1940	5,826		−4.0%
1950	6,217		6.7%
1960	6,911		11.2%
1970	7,209		4.3%
1980	7,278		1.0%
1990	7,341		0.9%
2000	6,886		−6.2%
2010	6,780		−1.5%
2016 (est.)	6,487		−4.3%
U.S. Decennial Census

As of the census of 2000, there were 6,886 people, 2,627 households, and 1,841 families residing in the town. The population density was 137.6 inhabitants per square mile (53.1/km^{2}). There were 2,872 housing units at an average density of 57.4 per square mile (22.2/km^{2}). The racial makeup of the town was 91.93% White, 4.40% African American, 0.45% Native American, 0.48% Asian, 0.01% Pacific Islander, 0.96% from other races, and 1.77% from two or more races. Hispanic or Latino of any race were 2.35% of the population.

There were 2,627 households, out of which 34.3% had children under the age of 18 living with them, 52.6% were married couples living together, 12.8% had a female householder with no husband present, and 29.9% were non-families. 23.9% of all households were made up of individuals, and 10.0% had someone living alone who was 65 years of age or older. The average household size was 2.60 and the average family size was 3.09.

In the town, the population was spread out, with 28.0% under the age of 18, 7.9% from 18 to 24, 27.7% from 25 to 44, 23.1% from 45 to 64, and 13.3% who were 65 years of age or older. The median age was 37 years. For every 100 females, there were 92.3 males. For every 100 females age 18 and over, there were 90.8 males.

The median income for a household in the town was $35,206, and the median income for a family was $41,696. Males had a median income of $33,189 versus $20,881 for females. The per capita income for the town was $17,316. About 10.5% of families and 14.4% of the population were below the poverty line, including 21.5% of those under age 18 and 6.0% of those age 65 or over.

== Notable people ==
- Charles Bogardus, Illinois state legislator, farmer, and businessman, lived in Ridgeway
- John Caldwell, former US Congressman from Michigan, was born here.

== Communities and locations in Ridgeway ==
- Glenwood Lake – A small lake shared with the Village of Medina. It drains into the Oak Orchard River.
- Jeddo – A hamlet by the west town line on NY-104.
- Knowlesville - A small hamlet on the Erie Canal. Named after settler William Knowles. Home to the Orleans County fairgrounds.
- Medina - The north part of the Village of Medina is in the town.
- North Ridgeway – A hamlet at the west town line on NY-269.
- Oak Orchard on-the-Ridge – Location on NY-104 on the eastern side of the town, next to the Oak Orchard River.
- Oak Orchard River – A stream that flows northward through the town.
- Ridgeway – A hamlet at the intersection of Routes NY-63 (Lyndonvile Road) and NY-104 (Ridge Road).
- West Ridgeway – A hamlet west of Ridgeway village on NY-104.
