= Fire cut =

Masonry technique

In the construction of masonry buildings, a fire cut or fireman's cut is a diagonal chamfer of the end of a joist or beam where it enters a masonry wall. If the joist burns through somewhere along its length, damage to the wall is prevented as the fire cut allows the joist to fail and still leave the masonry wall standing.

Without fire cut joists, if the burnt joists fail and rotate the unchamfered ends of the joists as they deflect downwards, this would damage the masonry wall at the connection point and possibly pull the wall inward.
