= Charles Bogardus =

American politician

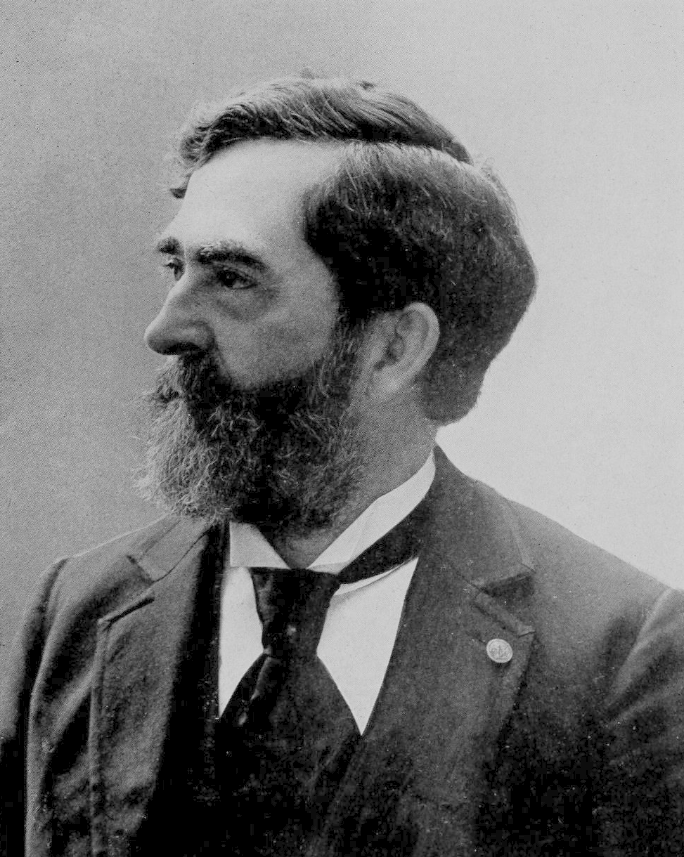

Member of the Illinois Senate
- In office 1889–1901

Member of the Illinois House of Representatives
- In office 1885–1889

Personal details
- Born: March 28, 1841 Cayuga County, New York
- Died: October 18, 1929 (aged 88) Pellston, Michigan
- Party: Republican
- Occupation: Politician, farmer, businessman
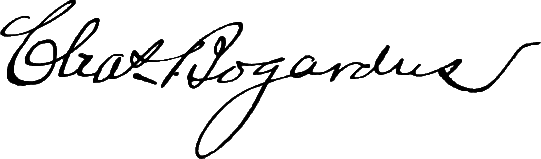
- Signature

Charles Bogardus (March 28, 1841 – October 18, 1929) was an American politician, farmer, and businessman.

== Biography ==
Bogardus was born in Cayuga County, New York on March 28, 1841. He went to the public schools and worked at a country store in Cayuga County. He served in the 151st New York Volunteer Infantry during the American Civil War and was commissioned a colonel in the Union Army. He then worked in the mercantile business in Ridgeway, New York. In 1872, Bogardus moved to Paxton, Illinois with his wife and family. He was involved with the real estate business and with farming. Bogardus also helped organize other businesses in Paxton.

Bogardus served in the Illinois House of Representatives from 1885 to 1889 and was a Republican. He then served in the Illinois Senate from 1889 to 1901. In 1900, Bogardus and his wife settled in Pellston, Michigan where he was involved in the lumbering business; he still had his office in Paxton.

Bogardus died at his home in Pellston from kidney problems on October 18, 1929.
