= Skinner-Tinkham House =

Historic house in New York, United States

- U.S. National Register of Historic Places
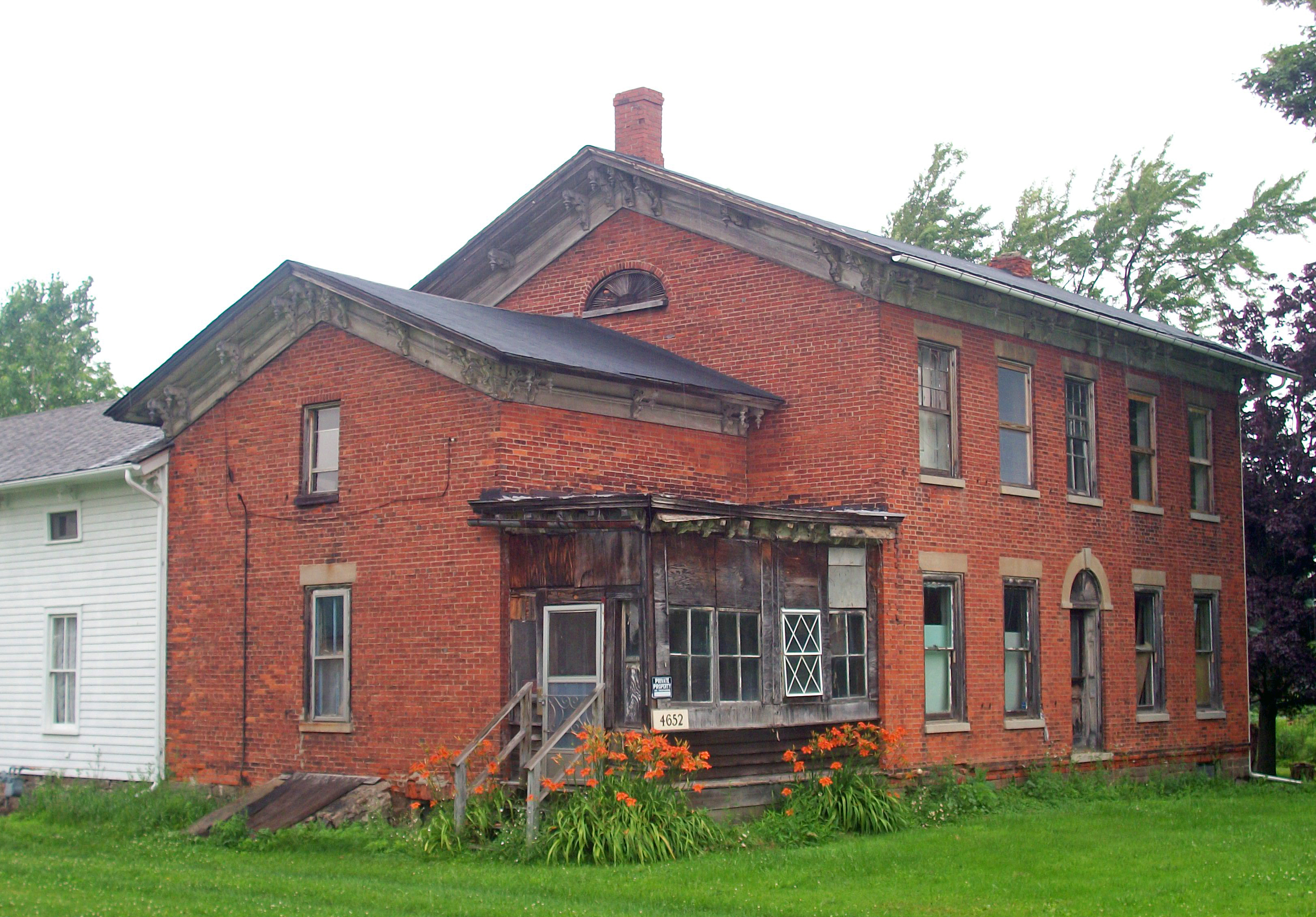
- South profile and east elevation, 2010

- Location within New York Location within the United States
- Interactive map showing the location Skinner-Tinkham House
- Location: Barre Center, NY
- Nearest city: Batavia
- Coordinates: 43°11′11″N 78°11′40″W
- Area: 1.5 acres (6,100 m^{2})
- Architectural style: Federal, Italianate
- NRHP reference No.: 04000291
- Added to NRHP: April 15, 2004

The Skinner-Tinkham House, commonly known as the Barre Center Tavern, is located at Maple Street and Oak Orchard Road (New York State Route 98) in Barre Center, New York, United States. It is a brick house in the Federal style built around 1830. It was renovated after the Civil War, which brought some Italianate touches to it.

Originally it was a tavern along one of the Western New York region's busier transportation routes, renovated into a house by a wealthy local farmer after that business ended. It is a rare surviving Federal-style brick tavern in Orleans County. It is currently vacant and in a state of disrepair, although some restoration efforts have been made. In 2004 it and a nearby barn were listed on the National Register of Historic Places.

== Buildings and grounds ==
The house and barn are located on a 1.5-acre (6,100 m^{2}) lot at the northwest corner of the roads, on the hamlet of Barre Center. The hamlet is a small group of buildings on small lots grouped along the highway in the midst of the surrounding rural area. To the immediate south is a commercial building and church; a general store is located across the street and to the southeast. The land in the area is flat.

=== Exterior ===
At the northeast corner of the lot, the house is a two-story five-by-two-bay structure faced in brick laid in Flemish bond on a stone foundation topped with a gabled roof currently covered in tar paper, pierced by two brick end chimneys. A one-and-a-half-story brick wing with similar roof projects from the south face; from its west projects a frame wing of similar height sided in clapboard. Between the main block and south wing is a small wooden addition in a visible state of disrepair. In the center of the south wing is the entrance to the cellar.

A two-brick water table runs across the front of the main block at door sill level. Steps that would lead up to the centrally located main entrance are missing. All windows on the east (front) facade have wide stone lintels and sills; the main entrance has a round-arched stone lintel with keystone, filled with a wooden fan. The center lintel on the second floor has "1829", the date of the house's construction, carved into it. The wide overhanging eaves at the roofline shelter a wide plain frieze and are supported by wooden brackets.

On the north and south sides the brick is laid in common bond instead. The gable fields have blind lunettes with their original wooden fans. The west (rear) elevation has more of the foundation visible, exposing limestone blocks laid in a random ashlar pattern. Only the sills are stone on its windows; flat brick arches top the windows. The south elevation of that wing has one centrally located window on each story. The larger one on the first story has a similar treatment to the eastern first-story windows on the main block; the one above it has a stone sill and flat brick lintel.

The west wing's foundation is coursed ashlar on the south elevation, and coursed rubble on the other two. Its cornice is bracketed only on the south side, the side visible from Maple Street. A one-story concrete block addition with gabled roof extends further west from that side.

=== Interior ===
The front door is framed with its original semicircular limestone arch with keystone and impost blocks. It opens on a large square room filling the building's southeast corner and extending two-thirds of its depth. A fireplace with original mantel is on the south wall; a narrow stair goes to the upper story behind the west wall while a door opens onto the rear porch. The past presence of a chair rail in the room is evident from the plaster behind where it was. The original baseboard and some window trim remains.

In the north end of the wing are two rooms. The larger one, in the northeast corner, has its black marbleized mantel on its fireplace on the north wall, as well as its original architrave and window moldings. The smaller room, in the northwest, no longer has its mantel but its chimney cupboards remain.

The south wing has a single room. A former fireplace has been closed up. From the room a door and former window, now converted into shelving, open into the west wing. In it are two large rooms separated by a core with pantry, closets, and vestibule. The inside of the concrete addition has a track in the ceiling, a water supply and floor drain, attesting to its use as a slaughterhouse.

On the second floor of the main block are three bedrooms, all with their original finishes. A steep, narrow stair leads up to the attic, where the original roof framing is visible. It consists of three heavy beech king post trusses with purlins and common rafters, about 16 inches (41 cm) below the current roof. The two chimneys corbel together and form a common flue. At the south end are the remains of a small 6-by-8-foot (1.8 by 2.4 m) brick room.

The south wing has a single room upstairs, matching the one below. The ceiling rafters slope down from the collar ties; there is no attic. A cellar, accessed via the bulkhead door on the south side, runs under the entire brick portion of the building. Three more Medina sandstone steps lead into the large room under the south wing, which has the stone cistern parged with mortar in its western half. A load-bearing stone wall with two brick arches supporting brick fireplaces on the north side sits under the divide to the main block; the large room beyond is divided by a wooden partition. Stairs corresponding to the ones on the first floor rise below them to the now-closed opening. The entire cellar is floored in brick; a still-functional perimeter drain empties into a hole in the northwest corner.

There is no cellar in the west wing. Instead, there is a crawl space. In the southeast corner is a stone-line well 25 feet (7.6 m) deep.

== History ==
Original landowner Stephen Skinner had first bought the 50 acres (20 ha) on which the house now stands from the Holland Land Company, original owners of most of Western New York, in 1827, but did not make any payments after his down payment and the land reverted to the company. He repurchased it the next year and built the main block of the tavern. On several other properties he built a blacksmith's shop, coal house, sawmill and paint shop. This time he was able to make his payments, albeit at some points in cattle rather than cash, and received full title in 1832.

At the time of construction, in 1829, there were only two other houses in Barre Center, both modest wooden structures built when Barre Center had been the main stop between Albion and Batavia along the Oak Orchard Road, today Route 98. Among them, a brick house, especially one of that size and stylistic sophistication, stood out. The hamlet grew in the prosperous early 1830s as it developed an agricultural economy, since the travel-related business was being displaced by Benton's Corners, at the junction of Route 98 and what is now NY 31A two miles (3 km) to the north, as the Erie Canal linked Albion with the rest of the state.

Skinner sold the house in 1836 to two other men, who soon lost it to foreclosure in the Panic of 1837. Several of Skinner's other properties also went into default, and there is no mention of him or his large family in records from the 1840 census. In 1839 the property was bought by an Edward Rowlandson, who continued its use as a tavern.

He was able to operate it successfully, and maps of the area from the 1850s identify it as his tavern. The late Greek Revival molding on some of the interior architraves suggests some of the subdivisions of the interior rooms in the main block occurred under his ownership. Doors were grained as well, and some of the fireplaces may have had stoves added at that time.

In 1865 Relly Tinkham, discharged from the Union Army due to a serious illness contracted while guarding hospitals in Baltimore, bought the property. A Barre native who had already acquired other properties originally developed by Skinner, a successful local farmer who had expanded into barrel making before the American Civil War. It is likely that he converted the tavern into a house, as the rise of the railroads had finished the decline in Barre's importance as a transportation stop, and by 1875 no hotels are listed in local business directories.

The conversion left the first floor's tavern layout alone, but raised the roof and built the frame western wing with its more modern kitchen. On the front facade he added the Italianate decorative touches to the windows and doors. It is likely that he also had the barn, the property's other contributing resource, built with its denticulated cornice. This may have taken place around 1874 since tax records show a large jump in the property's assessment that year, which may also be due to outbuildings no longer extant.

In 1884 he sold the property and moved to another home nearby. Property records for the next two decades are scarce, but during the later years of the 19th century it is likely that some changes were made to the house. Most significant among them were the installation of larger, taller front windows, and the subdivision of the large upstairs room that had previously only had a removable wooden partition.

Carl and Sarah Hakes bought the property in 1913. They owned it for another four decades, the longest tenure of any of the house's owners. Their changes consisted of adding modern plumbing, including a bathroom behind the old public room, and heating to the house. In 1957 they sold to their son Wilson, who had been renting the property. He sold it in 1964.

From that year on the house was occupied by a series of tenants, most of them farmworkers. The frame wing filled up with furniture, clothing and other discarded items. The main block continued to be occupied, but less frequently maintained.

By the end of the 20th century, it had become vacant for a few years. Andrea Rebeck, Historic Sites Restoration Coordinator for the New York State Office of Parks, Recreation and Historic Preservation, moved into the house to oversee those efforts in preparation for listing on the National Register. An archeological dig was also undertaken.

== See also ==
- National Register of Historic Places listings in Orleans County, New York
