= Main Street Historic District (Medina, New York) =

Historic district in New York, United States

- U.S. National Register of Historic Places
- U.S. Historic district
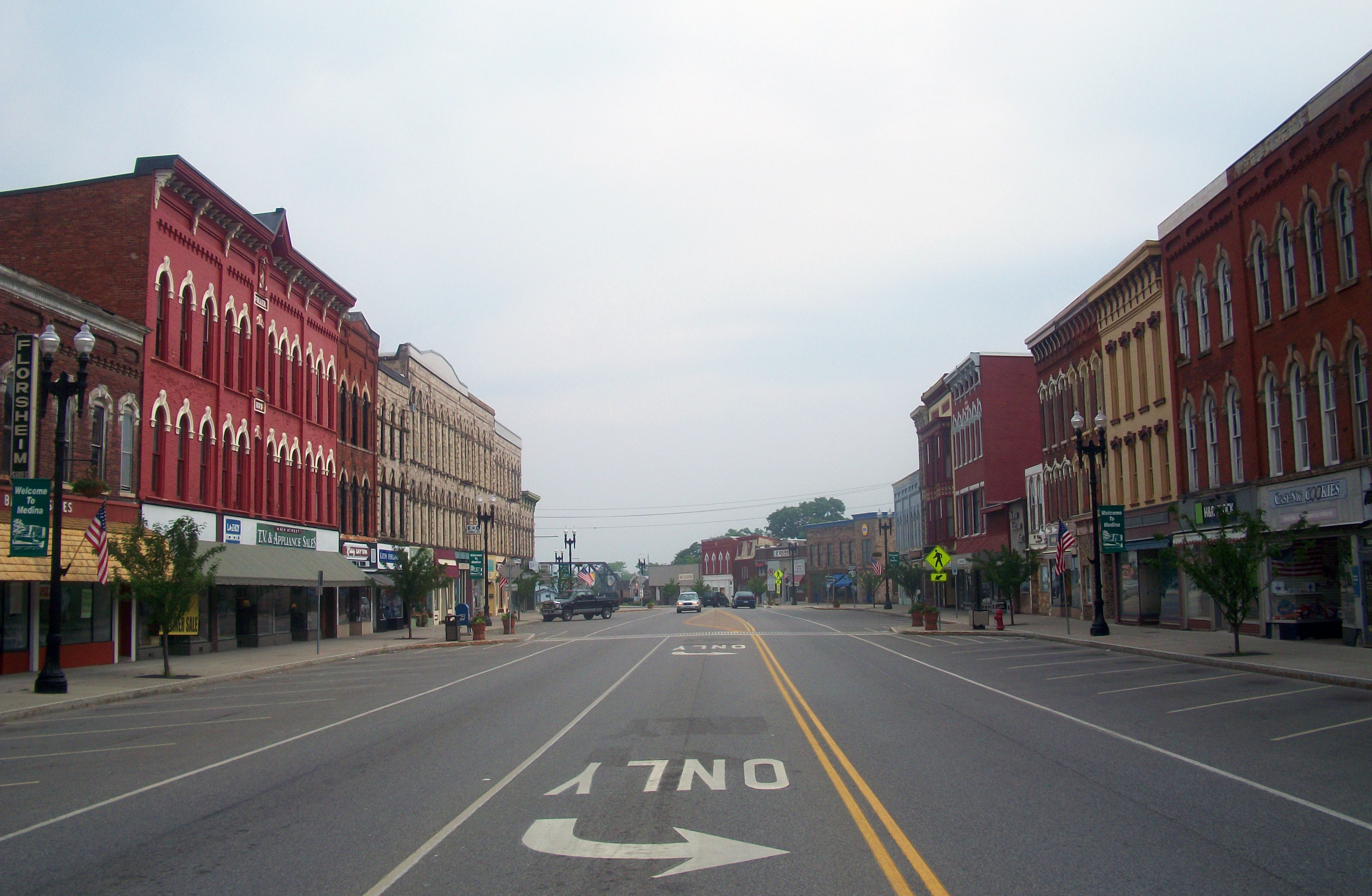
- View north on Main Street from Center Street junction, 2010. Fuller and J.A. French blocks on left.

- Location within New York Location within the United States
- Location: Medina, NY
- Nearest city: Lockport
- Coordinates: 43°13′13″N 78°23′13″W
- Area: 12 acres (4.9 ha)
- Built: 1845-1925
- Architectural style: Romanesque, Queen Anne, Italianate
- NRHP reference No.: 95000213 (original); 97001457 (increase)
- Added to NRHP: March 23, 1995 (original); November 24, 1997 (increase)

The Main Street Historic District in Medina, New York, United States, is the downtown commercial core of the village. It is a 12-acre (4.9 ha) area stretching south along Main Street from the Erie Canal to the railroad tracks.

Its buildings, all but three of which contribute to its historic character, reflect the development of Medina from the early days of the canal, where a bend in the route made it a natural harbor, in the 1830s to the 1920s. They are brick or stone buildings in a variety of architectural styles from the 19th century, primarily Italianate. Many of them have been renovated after a period of decline in the mid-20th century. In 1995 it was designated a historic district and listed on the National Register of Historic Places. Two years later, a rail freight depot at the south end was added when further research established that it was historically related to other buildings in the district.

== Geography ==
The district is an irregularly shaped area whose axis is Main Street for a block and a half north and south of East and West Center Street (NY 31 and 31E/63 respectively. South of the Main-Center intersection, Main Street is also itself part of routes 31 and 63). Its boundaries are defined by lot lines and streets. The terrain is level with a slight descent to the canal and creek at the northeast.

At the north, the district includes the properties on the east side of Main north of Pearl Street that back on the canal just north of the bend it takes after crossing the Oak Orchard River to the immediate east. Its boundary continues along the rear property line of the east side of Main, excluding the parking lot at the canal basin, then expanding westward at East Center to include some properties on both sides of the street east of Manilla Place, stopping just short of St. John's Episcopal Church, the "Church in the Middle of the Street" and one of Medina's oldest public buildings. It then returns to the rear lines of the east side of Main, following the CSX railroad tracks back to the street.

On the west side of Main it includes all the properties down to North Avenue. The district takes in the large railroad complex, excluding the hardware store on the corner with West Avenue, which it follows north to just past the tracks. The 1997 boundary increase added the Medina Railroad Museum across the street, extending the southwest corner of the district to Gwinn Street. After that the boundary crosses the street again and takes in the old train station building, then turns north at the back of City Hall to follow rear property lines on the east side of Main, including the buildings with frontage on the east side of Proctor Place. One lot south of Pearl Street, it turns east to exclude a house and vacant lot along that back to Main, which it then follows back up to the north end of the district.

This tightly drawn boundary encloses an area of 12 acres (4.9 ha). Of the 52 buildings within it, only three are too modern to be considered contributing properties. There are no houses; most are multistory commercial buildings with a few having apartments above street level. The railroad-related properties, First Presbyterian Church and City Hall and its fire station are the few exceptions. It excludes Medina's Register-listed post office and St. John's, found eligible.

== History ==
The settlement of what became Medina began with the announcement of the canal's construction in 1817. Within a few years some houses had sprung up for canal workers near the bend, and by 1825 the area in the northeastern portion of the district known as the docks, had been well developed, with a general store. At the time what is now Main Street was known as Shelby Street. None of those buildings are extant, mostly wood frame structures, are extant, having been demolished to make way for the current buildings. The foundation of the former Arcade at 343–347 Main Street is the only remnant of the village's early years still extant.

In 1823 the Holland Land Company, the original European owners of much of Western New York, sent Ebenezer Mix to survey and lay out a village at the Ridgeway-Shelby town line. He completed this by 1826. This, combined with the settlement around the docks, became Medina. At that time, it was a way station along the canal for barges and an overnighting point for passengers. Many of its early buildings were hotels.

Medina grew quickly. In addition to the canal it had good waterpower on Oak Orchard Creek (two mill races, one of which is reportedly still intact underground, ran along today's Main Street) and fertile land surrounding it. The settlement incorporated as a village in 1832, just seven years after its establishment. The 1840 census recorded 700 inhabitants. By the middle of the century the southwest portion of the village was being developed as a residential area. In 1855 the village's oldest extant hotel, the Paddock at 500–506 Main Street, was built. Around that time the Rochester, Lockport and Niagara Falls Railroad, the "Falls Road", was built through the village, at the southern end of the district. It took some, but not all, of the canal's traffic. By providing easier access to raw materials and markets for finished goods the railroad, which eventually became part of the New York Central Railroad, spurred industrial development along Main Street. The former main station, at 615 Main Street, built early in the 20th century, is one of the district buildings using locally quarried Medina sandstone, enjoying its peak usage as a building material at the time. At the same time the Rochester, Lockport and Buffalo Railroad offered electric trolley service that passed through Medina on tracks running along East Center, up Main and then to Commercial Street and east along a private right-of-way to Salt Works Road and then to West Center.

A series of fires in the 1860s and 1870s led to the construction of most of the district's extant buildings between 1870 and 1900. As a result, they are visually cohesive and uniformly scaled. The most architecturally distinguished building in the district, Bent's Opera House at the northwest corner of Main and Center, is an early product of this period.

The village had a diverse group of industries and retailers in the first decades of the 20th century. The fruit orchards in the farms around the village created a need for cold storage facilities near the railroad tracks. Three buildings, the warehouse at 630 Main Street that is now a carpet store, the 613-615 Main Street building and the railway museum building on West Street, reflect the importance of fruit growing at that time. So prosperous was Medina during this period that residents named the new municipal building in 1908 City Hall, out of the expectation that the village, now with a population of 5,000, would eventually become one.

Most of those industries declined and eventually closed down over the next few decades. The canal, by then carrying a small fraction of its former traffic, was widened and incorporated into the New York State Barge Canal system in the late 1910s. It continued to decline. The railroads were affected as well. In 1931 the trolley service was discontinued; the tracks themselves remained for another 30 years. After World War II the market for Medina sandstone dwindled as well. Freight and passenger traffic across the state began using the New York State Thruway, 10 miles (16 km) to the south, and eventually the Central discontinued passenger service along the route before going bankrupt itself.

The buildings of downtown Medina have remained. Many were restored and renovated with state and federal grant programs. The village has continued to benefit from the canal, which is now mainly a recreational resource but still carries some freight.

== Significant contributing properties ==
The district's boundaries contain 54 buildings, one structure (the railroad tracks) and one site (Rotary Park, at the southeast corner of Main and Center). The park and three nearby buildings, as well as one near the train station, are the only non-contributing properties in the district. Among the others, some are notable within the context of the district. None have been listed individually on the National Register.

- Austin and Dye Cold Storage Warehouse, 613–615 Main Street. A 1901 three-story Medina sandstone vernacular building that occupies the southeast corner of the district.
- Bancroft Hotel, 343–347 Main Street. Its foundation dates to 1835, making it the oldest building element in the district. The rest of the building was replaced after a 1927 fire. Today it houses an auto-parts store.
- Bent Block, 444 Main Street. Built in 1865, this Medina sandstone building once housed an opera house and was the center of Medina's cultural life.
- Building at 415 Proctor Place. Records show that a public right-of-way once went through this former wagon shop with a bricked-over tunnel.
- Building at 435 Main Street. The district's oldest building is a stone structure with brick facade built in 1846.
- Building at 512 Main Street. This brick Italianate building has some excellent Art Deco storefronts with red and black Carrara glass.
- Central Bank of Medina, 514 Main Street. The district's only neoclassical building dates to 1890, with a facade remodeled in 1926.
- City Hall, 600 Main Street. The only government building in the district, built in 1908, is also its only Richardsonian Romanesque, with rockfaced Medina sandstone and round-headed arch moldings. Its name reflects the village's ambitions at the time of its construction. Modern rear addition is home to the fire department.
- S.A. Cook Building, 526–540 Main Street. A long, horizontal brick building that was seen as very modern when it was built in 1911.
- First Presbyterian Church, 520 Main Street. The district's only church is an 1872 brick Romanesque Revival structure set back slightly more from the street than its neighbors.
- Fuller Block, 428 Main Street. Decoration on this 1875 Italianate commercial building includes drip molding on the round-arched windows, intricate brick corbelling and a bracketed cornice. Housed the local G. C. Murphy store for many years.
- Hart House, 111–115 West Center Street. Built in 1876 as a hotel, this five-bay brick structure is one of the most accomplished of the Italianate buildings in the district, with full-height brick pilasters, segmentally arched windows, stone crowns and a bracketed cornice.
- Maher Brothers Block, 116–120 East Center Street. This 1873 building is the only one with a neo-Renaissance facade, added 30 years after construction.
- Medina Cold Storage Warehouse, 630 Main Street. Built in 1907, it is similar to the Austin and Dye building across the street. A wood frame packing house was added to the south elevation in the early 1920s.
- Medina Railroad Museum, 530 West Street. A 300-by-40-foot (91 by 12 m) timber frame clapboard-sided structure built in 1905 that is believed to be the largest extant wooden freight depot in the country. It was converted to its present purpose in 1991.
- New York Central Railroad Station, 615 West Street. A hip roofed structure presently used as a senior center, it was built in 1908 of mixed materials and remains mostly intact.
- Paddock's Hotel, 500–506 Main Street. The oldest hotel building in the district dates to 1855.

== Preservation ==
Medina has made the district part of a historic overlay district in its zoning code. The village's district includes some areas outside of the Register-listed one, such as an extension north to Eagle Street and more of East Center Street along the canal basin. It is meant to protect the district's historic character within the context of Medina's commercial zoning.

In 2009 the Genesee/Finger Lakes Regional Planning Commission, with the cooperation of the village and representatives of its downtown business community, drafted a revitalization plan for the district. Business and consumers were surveyed to get data as to what they thought downtown's issues were. Consumers were also asked where they came from and how they used downtown.

Businesses, many of which were independent and owned the space they operated from, represented a diverse group of activities, primarily retail goods and services. They employed about 222 people. Most indicated that what they would be most interested in to improve downtown was grant or loan programs to assist with business improvements. Half of them thought parking was an issue for their customers.

The customers surveyed were primarily older women. Most were residents of the area who drove downtown to shop (usually at the grocery or drugstore) and attend to personal care needs. They came to downtown a few times a month and were most likely otherwise to go to a big box retailer, shops in nearby towns like Albion or Middleport or malls in the Buffalo area to the southwest. They liked the small-town feel of downtown, but felt it could use more parking and more attention to the appearance of vacant buildings.

The plan recommended that the village add a section to its comprehensive plan dealing with downtown. Specific measures that were suggested to address the issues were several measures to instill pride in the historic downtown, such as the redistribution of sections of the Register application to promote awareness of the district's historic qualities, a window display program in vacant storefronts, making property owners aware of the tax credits available to them for renovating income-producing property, and the creation of a Business Improvement District. A separate parking overlay was suggested, based on recalculated demand, to address that issue.

== See also ==
- National Register of Historic Places listings in Orleans County, New York

== Gallery ==
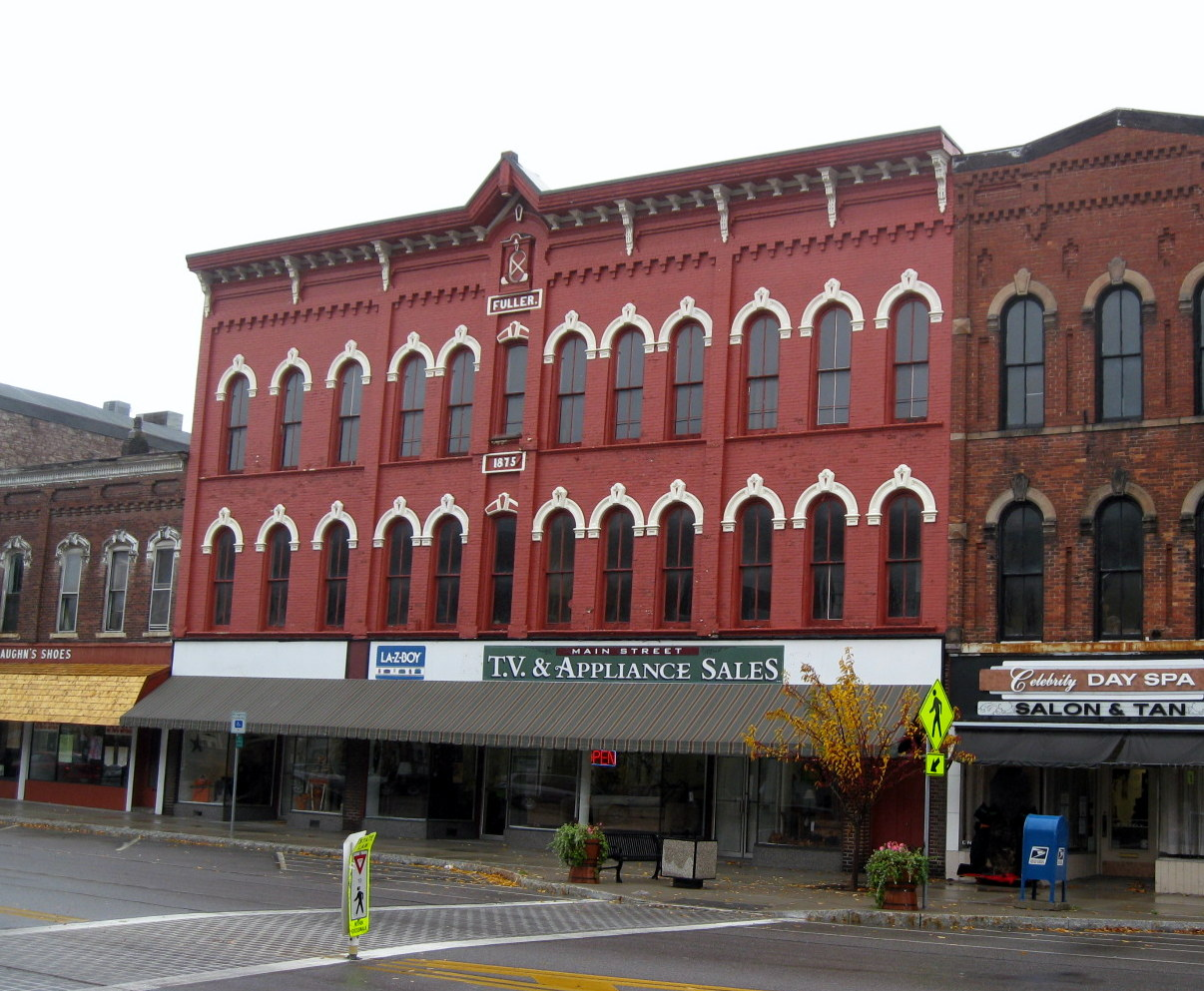
Fuller Building, October 2009

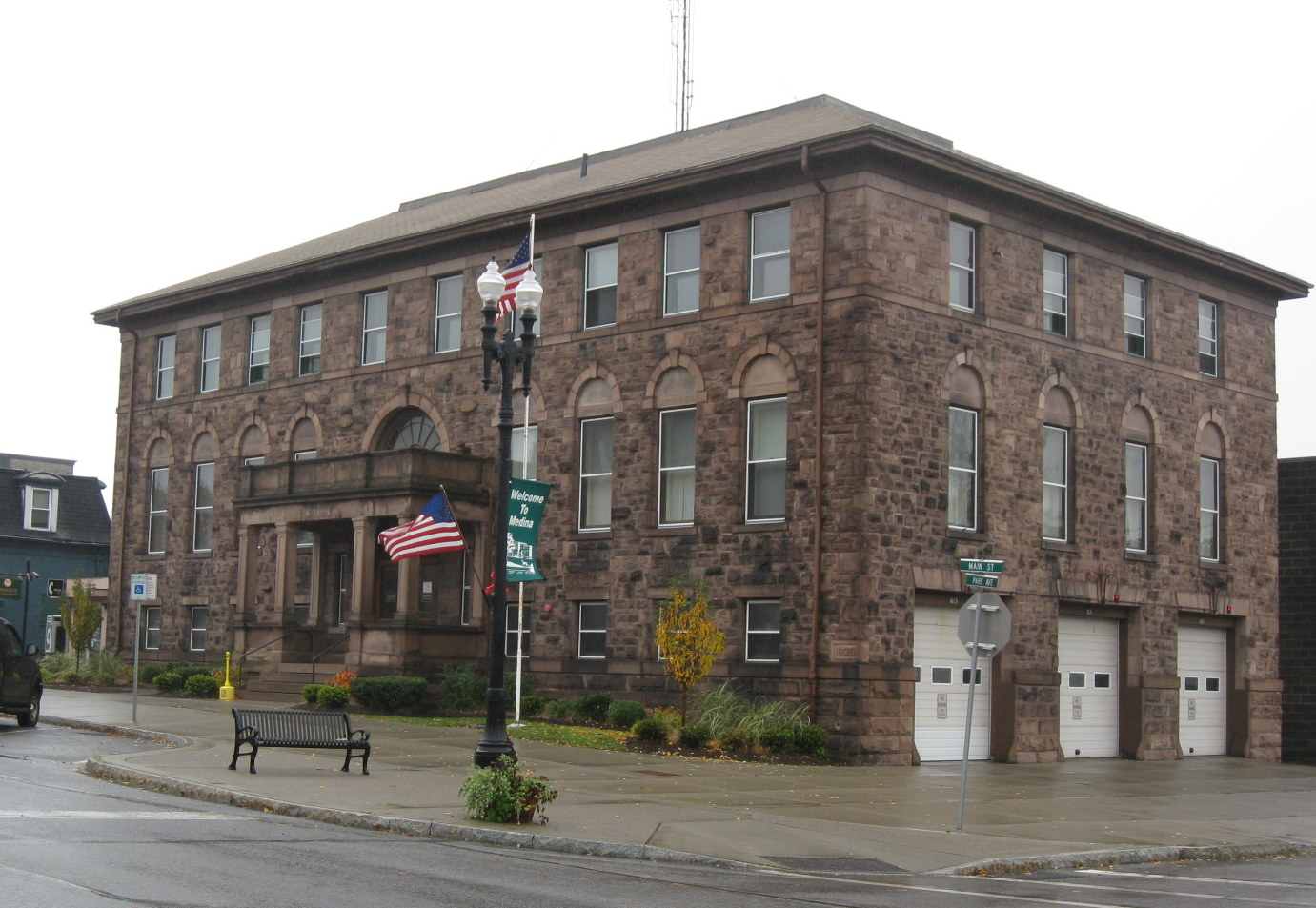
City Hall, October 2009

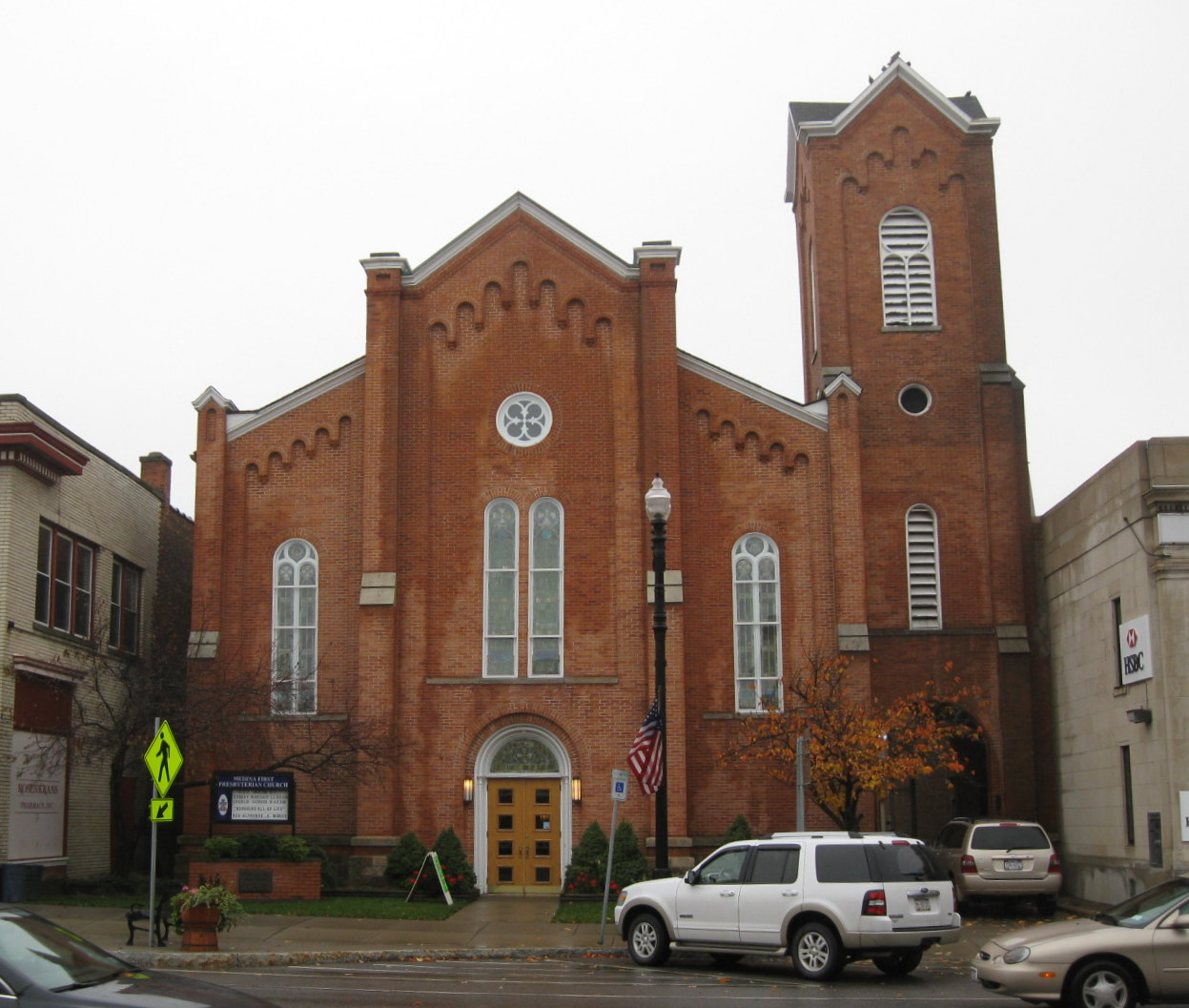
Medina First Presbyterian Church, October 2009

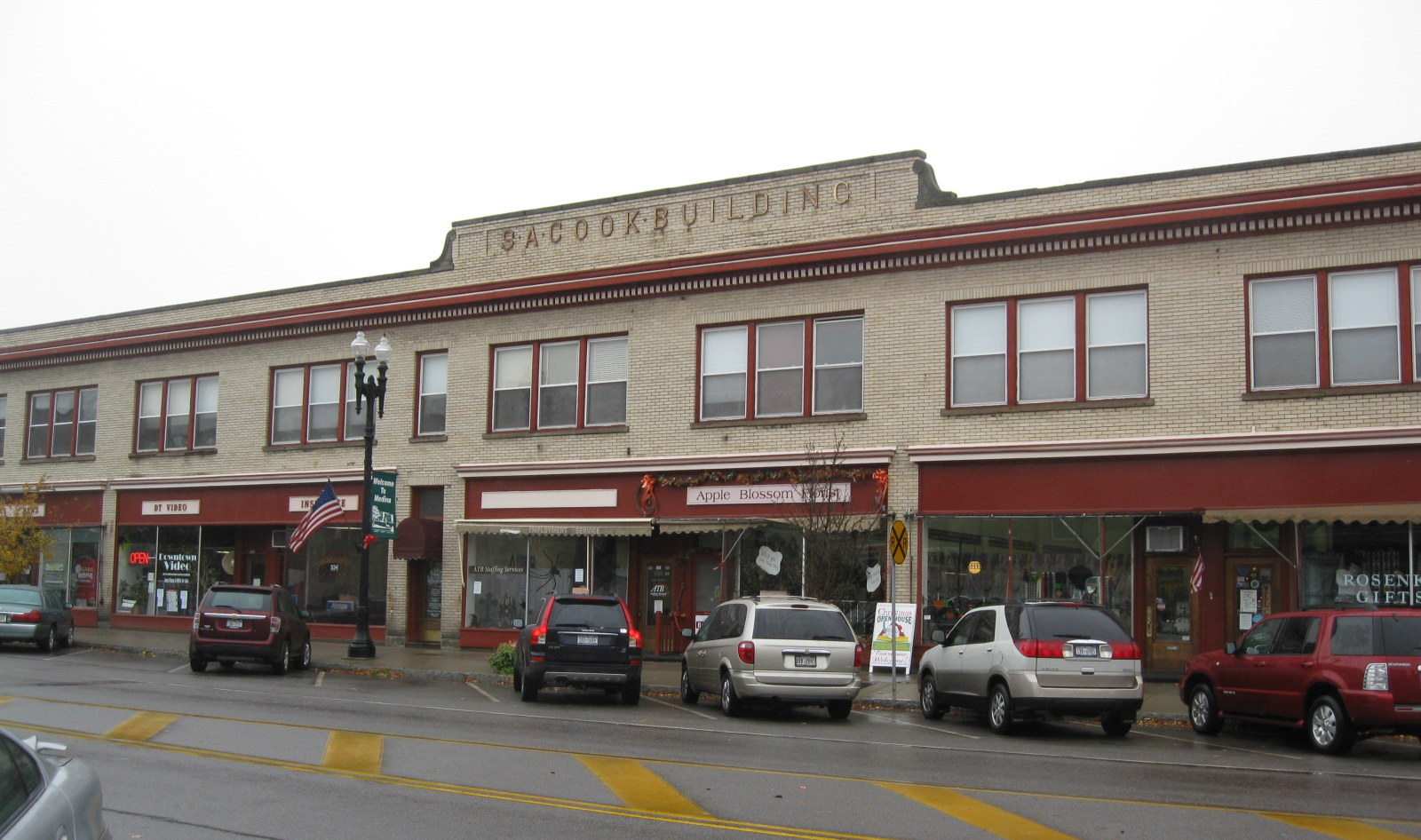
S.A. Cook Building, October 2009

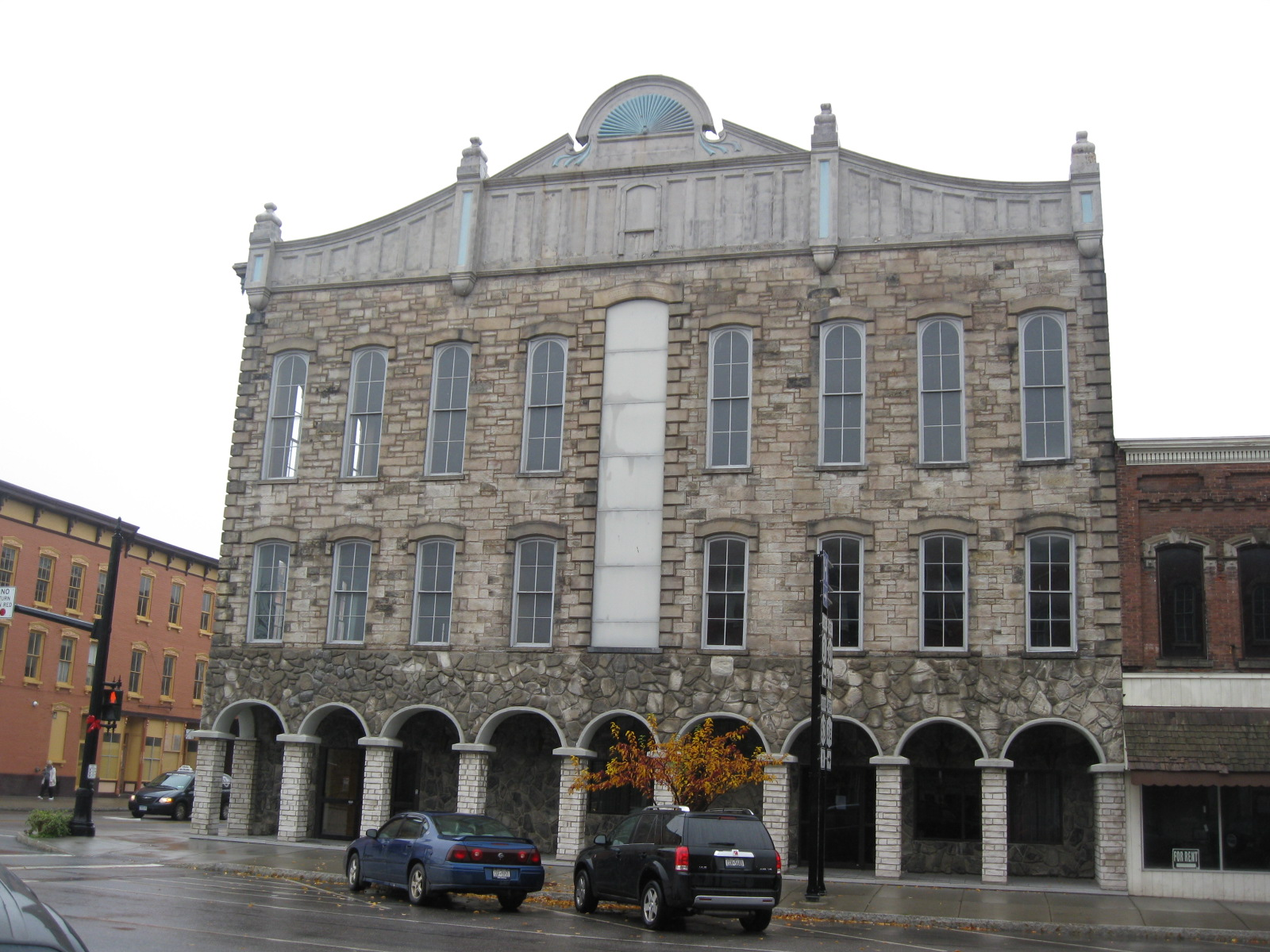
Bent Block / Bent Opera House, October 2009

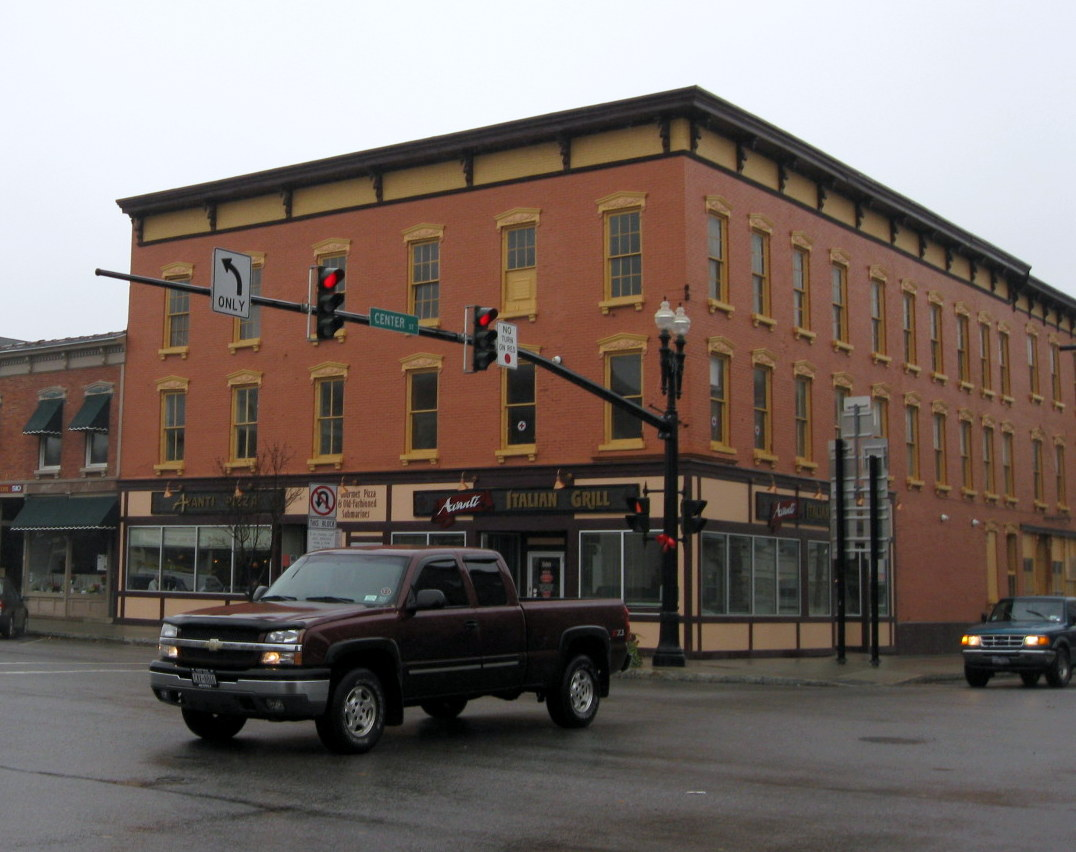
Paddock's Hotel, October 2009
