= Boxwood Cemetery =

Historic cemetery in New York, United States

- U.S. National Register of Historic Places
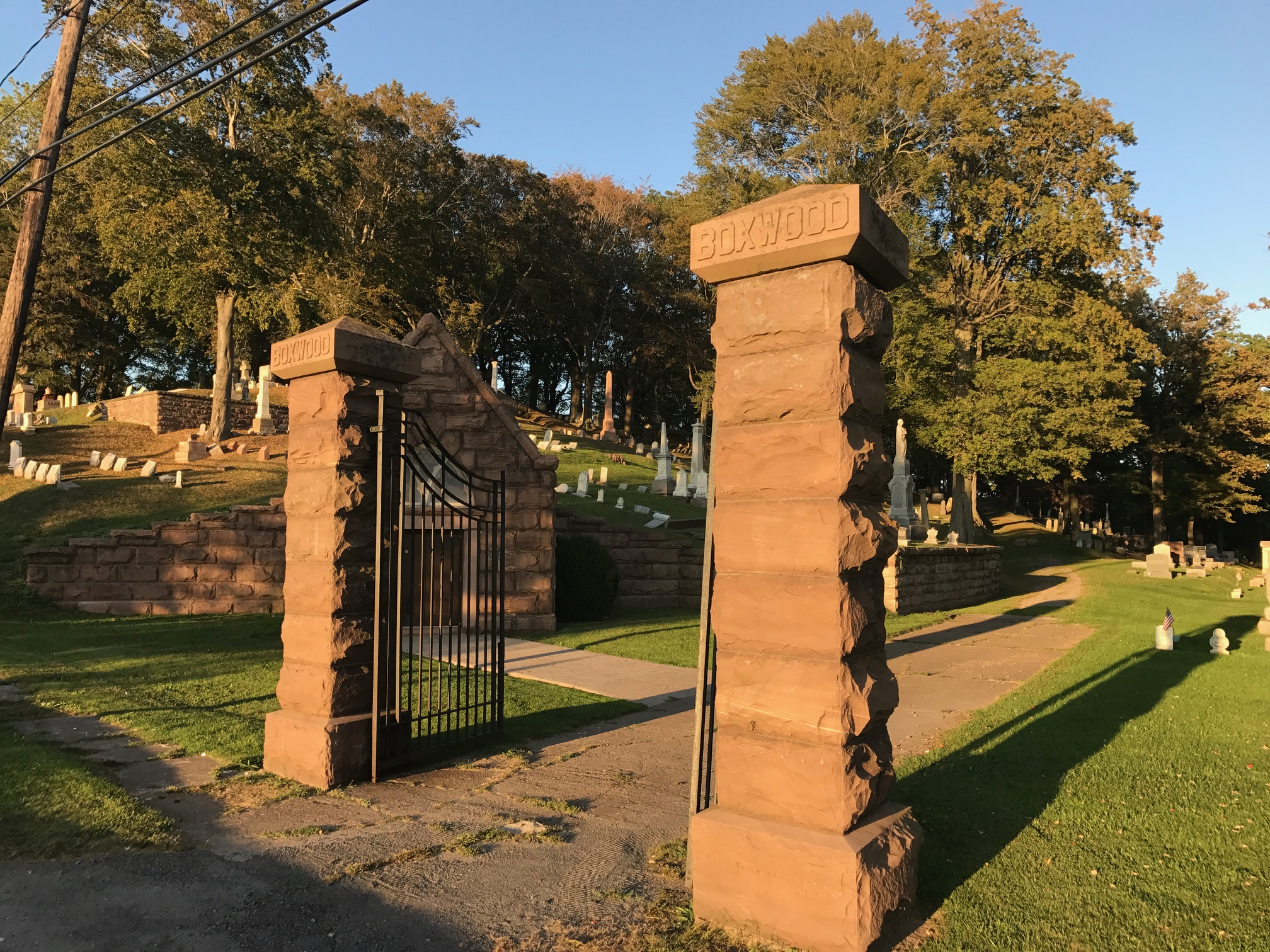

- Location within New York Location within the United States
- Location: 3717 N. Gravel Rd., Medina, New York
- Coordinates: 43°14′04″N 78°23′59″W
- Area: 19.39 acres (7.85 ha)
- Built: 1849, 1903, 1925
- Built by: Harry Ellis
- Architect: Levan Merritt, Adam Garter, Albert L. Swett, Charles Ingersol
- Architectural style: Gothic Revival
- NRHP reference No.: 13000450
- Added to NRHP: January 27, 2015

Boxwood Cemetery is a historic rural cemetery located at Medina in Orleans County, New York. The cemetery was established in 1849, and is the resting place of many early settlers. The cemetery includes approximately 5,000 marked burials in the cemetery, spanning from 1849 until the present day. It features entrance ways flanked by Medina sandstone columns and wrought-iron gates built in 1925. Located in the cemetery is a Gothic Revival style chapel built in 1903 of rough-cut red Medina sandstone.

It was listed on the National Register of Historic Places in 2015.

Boxwood is about 20 acres of land. It is located at the northwestern edge of the Village of Medina. Though portions of the cemetery are also in the Town of Ridgeway, the Village of Medina owns and operates the cemetery.

== Notable burials ==
- Silas Mainville Burroughs (1810–1860), US Congressman
- George Kennan (1845-1924), American explorer and author

== Gallery ==
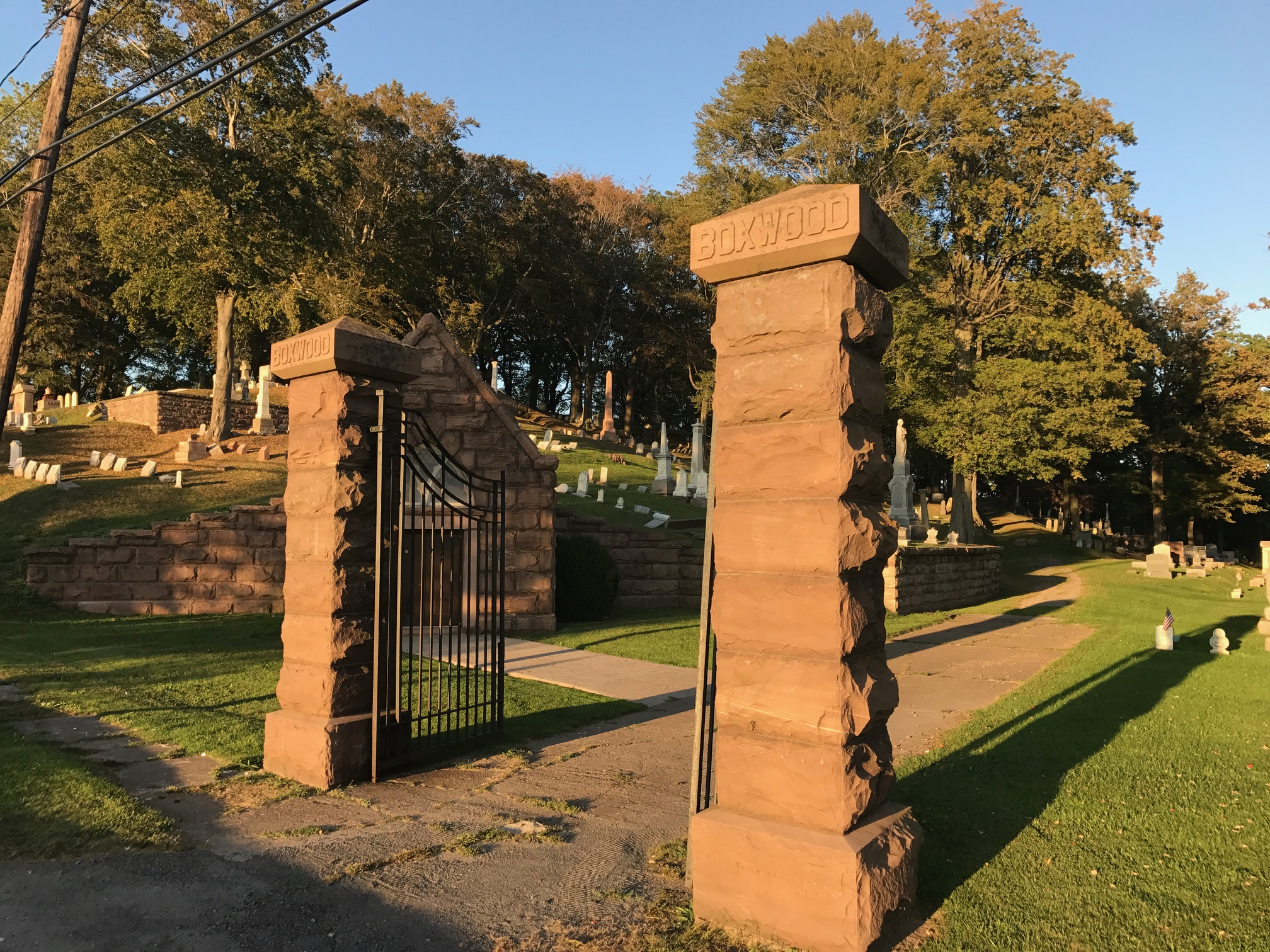
Boxwood Cemetery gates

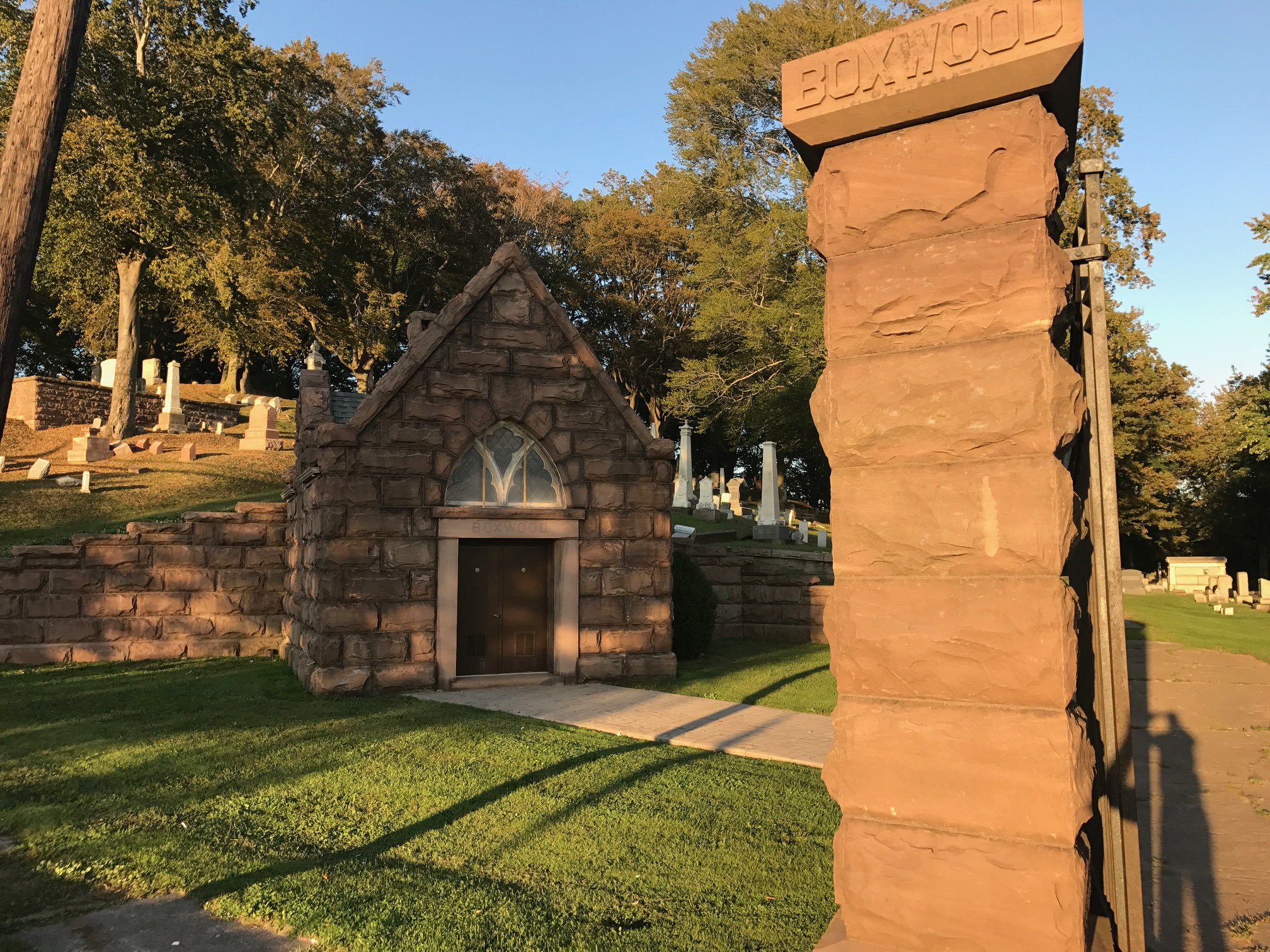
Boxwood Cemetery entry building

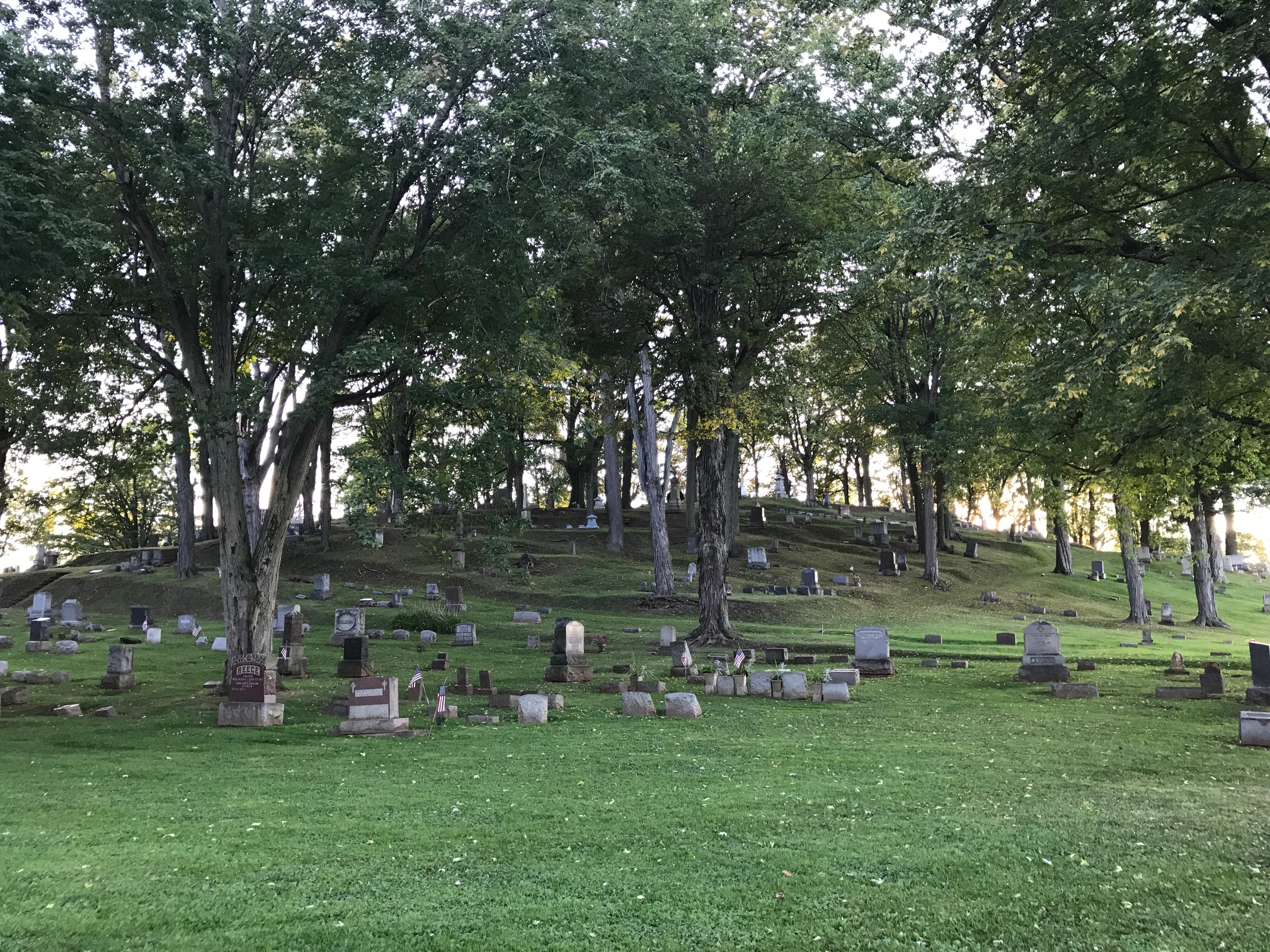
Boxwood Cemetery hillside

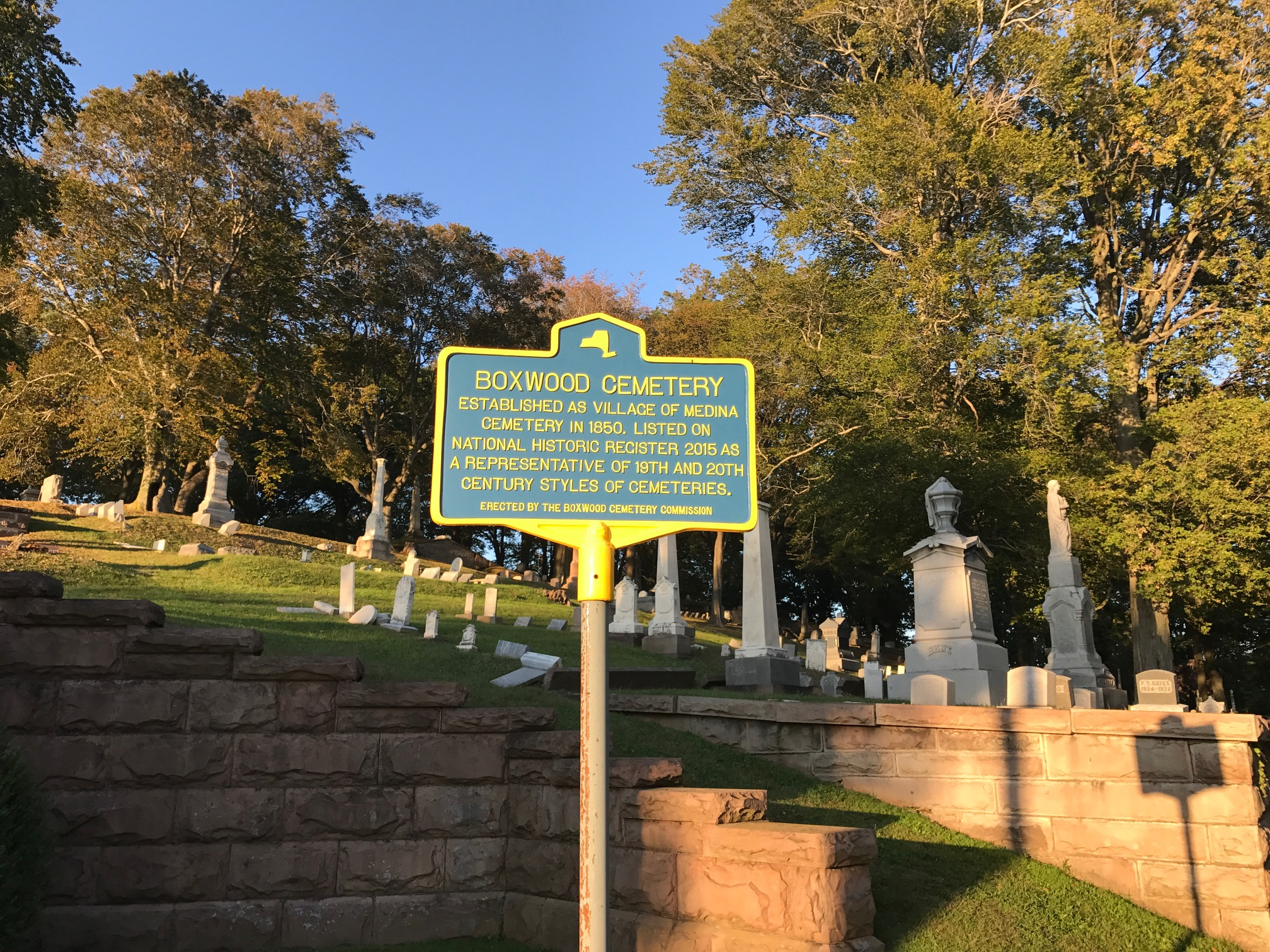
Boxwood Cemetery marker
