= George Kennan (explorer) =

American journalist (1845–1924)

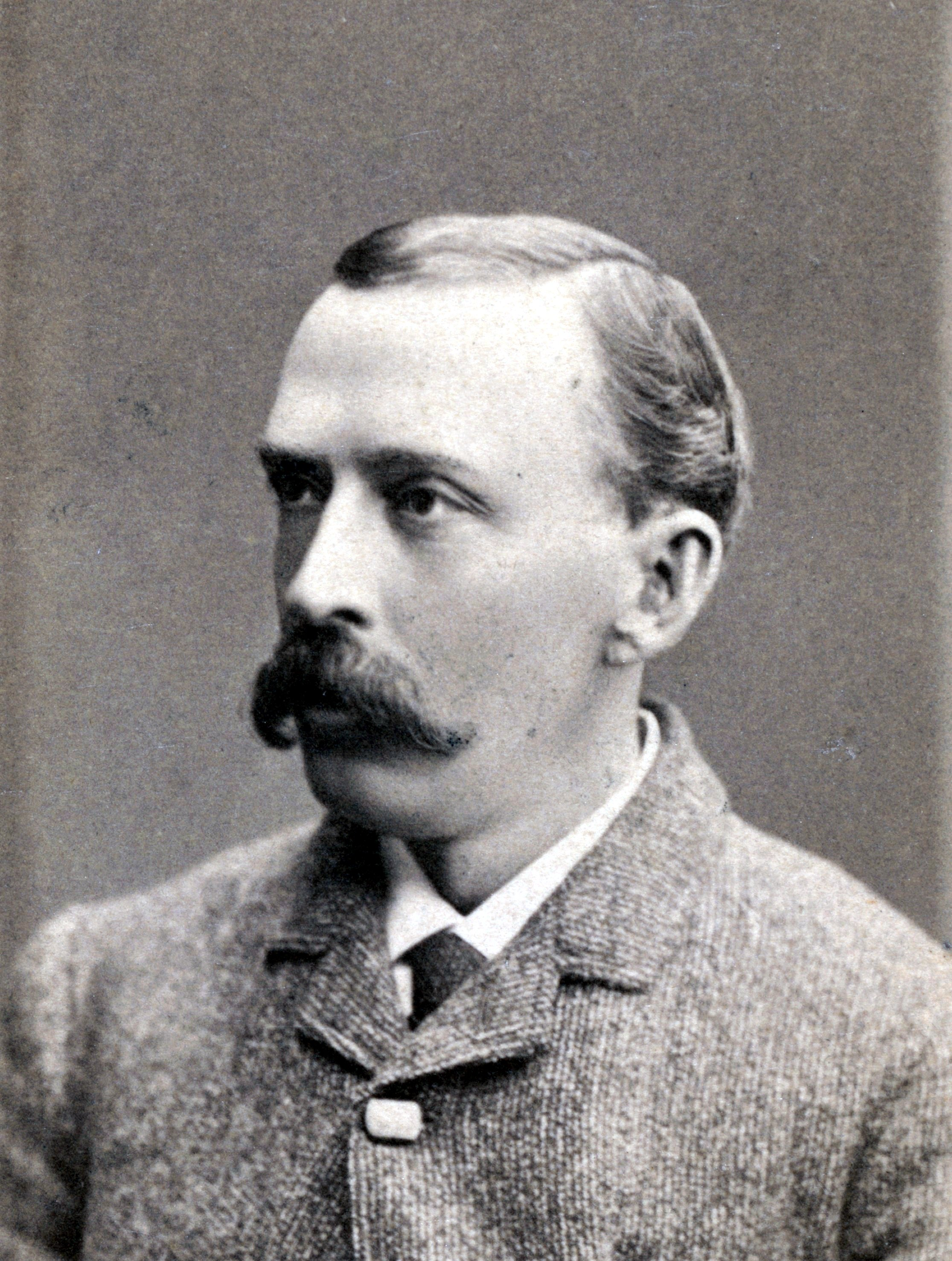
- Kennan in 1885
- Born: February 16, 1845; Norwalk, Ohio, U.S.
- Died: May 10, 1924 (aged 79); Medina, New York, U.S.
- Resting place: Boxwood Cemetery
- Occupations: Journalist, war correspondent
- Years active: 1878–1924

George Kennan (February 16, 1845 – May 10, 1924) was an American explorer noted for his travels in the Kamchatka and Caucasus regions of the Russian Empire. He was a cousin twice removed of the American diplomat and historian George F. Kennan, whose birthday he shared.

== Early life ==
George Kennan was born in Norwalk, Ohio, and was keenly interested in travel from an early age. However, family finances made him begin work at the Cleveland and Toledo Railroad Company telegraph office at 12.

== Career ==
In 1864, he secured employment with the Russian–American Telegraph Company to survey a route for a proposed overland telegraph line through Siberia and across the Bering Strait. Having spent two years in the wilds of Kamchatka, he returned to Ohio via Saint Petersburg and soon became well known by his lectures, articles, and a book about his travels.

In his book Tent Life in Siberia, Kennan provided ethnographies, histories and descriptions of many native peoples in Siberia, that are still important for researchers. They include stories about the Koraks (modern spelling: Koryaks), Kamchatdal (Itelmens), Chookchees (Chukchi), Yookaghirs (Yukaghirs), Chooances (Chuvans), Yakoots (Yakuts), and Gakouts. During 1870, he returned to St. Petersburg and travelled to Dagestan, in the northern Caucasus region, which had been annexed by the Russian Empire only ten years previously. There, he became the first American to explore its highlands, a remote Muslim region of herders, silversmiths, carpet-weavers, and other craftsmen.

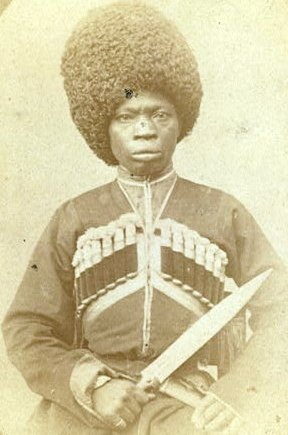
An Afro-Abkhazian. Photo by Kennan, 1870.

He traveled onward through the northern Caucasus area, stopping in Samashki and Grozny, before returning once more to America in 1871. These travels earned him a reputation as an "expert" on all matters pertaining to Russia.

Kennan subsequently (1878) obtained a position with the Associated Press based in Washington, D.C., and as a war correspondent travelled throughout his career to many conflict areas of the world. He also contributed articles to magazines, such as Century Magazine, Atlantic Monthly, McClure's Magazine (a muckraker magazine), National Geographic, and The Outlook. He was the first Corresponding Secretary for the National Geographic Society upon its founding in 1888.

In May 1885, Kennan began another voyage in Russia, this time across Siberia from Europe. He had been very publicly positive about the Tsarist Russian government and its policies and his journey was approved by the Russian government. However, in the course of his meetings with exiled dissidents during his travel, notably Nikolai Mikhailovich Yadrintsev (1842–1894), Kennan changed his mind about the Russian imperial system. He had been particularly impressed by Catherine Breshkovsky, the populist "little grandmother of the Russian Revolution." She had bidden him farewell in the small Transbaikal village to which she was confined by saying, "We may die in exile and our grand children may die in exile, but something will come of it at last." He also met a teenage Leonid Krasin during this journey.

On his return to the United States in August 1886, he became an ardent critic of the Russian autocracy and began to espouse the cause of Russian democracy. Kennan devoted much of the next twenty years to promoting the cause of a Russian revolution, mainly by lecturing. Kennan was one of the most prolific lecturers of the late 19th century. He spoke before a million or so people during the 1890s, including two hundred consecutive evening appearances during 1890–91 (excepting Sundays) before crowds of as many as 2000 people. His reports on conditions in Siberia were published serially by Century Magazine, and in 1891, he published a two-volume book Siberia and The Exile System. It, with first-hand interviews, data, and drawings by the artist George Albert Frost, had an influential effect on American public opinion.

Kennan befriended other émigrés as well, such as Peter Kropotkin and Sergei Kravchinskii. He became the best-known member of the Society of Friends of Russian Freedom, whose membership included Mark Twain and Julia Ward Howe, and also helped found Free Russia, the first English-language journal to oppose Tsarist Russia. In 1901, the Russian government responded by banning him from Russia.

Kennan was not completely consumed by Russian matters. As a reporter and war correspondent, he also covered American politics, the Spanish–American War, the assassination of President William McKinley, and the Russo-Japanese War, as well as World War I and the Russian Revolution. He also published a book, E. H. Harriman's Far Eastern Plans, (1917, The Country Life Press) about Harriman's efforts to secure a lease to the South Manchuria Railway from Japan, as well as The Chicago and Alton Case: A Misunderstood Transaction, (1916, The Country Life Press), defending Harriman's purchase of the Chicago & Alton Railroad from politically motivated criticism by the ICC and Teddy Roosevelt.

Kennan was vehemently against the October Revolution because he felt the Bolsheviks lacked the "knowledge, experience, or education to deal successfully with the tremendous problems that have come up for solutions since the overthrow of the Tsar." President Woodrow Wilson read and weighed Kennan's report in 1918 criticizing the Bolsheviks, but Kennan eventually criticized Wilson's administration for being too timid in intervening against Bolshevism.

Kennan's last criticism of Bolshevism was written in the Medina Tribune, a small-town newspaper, in July 1923:

The Russian leopard has not changed its spots.... The new Bolshevik constitution… leaves all power just where it has been for the last five years—in the hands of a small group of self-appointed bureaucrats which the people can neither remove nor control.

== Death ==
Kennan died at his home in Medina, New York, on May 10, 1924, and was buried in Boxwood Cemetery.

== Works ==
- Tent Life in Siberia: Adventures Among the Koraks and Other Tribes in Kamtchatka and Northern Asia New York: G. P. Putnam's Sons, 1870.
- Steppes of the Irtish. New York: The Century Co., 1888.
- Siberia and the Exile System. New York: The Century Co., 1891. Vol. 1 | Vol. 2
- Campaigning in Cuba. New York: The Century Co., 1899.
- Folk Tales of Napoleon: Napoleonder from the Russian; The Napoleon of the People from the French of Honoré de Balzac. Outlook Company. 1902.
- The Tragedy of Pelée. A Narrative of Personal Experience and Observation in Martinique. 1902.
- "The Fight for Reform in San Francisco," McClure's, Sept. 1907 & Nov. 1907.
- A Russian Comedy of Errors, With Other Stories and Sketches of Russian Life New York: The Century Co., 1915.
- The Salton Sea, An Account of Harriman's Fight with the Colorado River. The MacMillan Company. 1917.

== See also ==
- Nerchinsk katorga

== Sources ==
- Brumfield, William С. (2012), Appointment in Dauria: George Kennan, George Frost, and the Architectural Context (PDF), Harriman Review, vol. 18, New York: Harriman Institute, Columbia University, pp. 3–57, archived from the original (PDF) on December 11, 2013.
- Frith Maier (ed.), Vagabond Life: The Caucasus Journals of George Kennan. Seattle, WA: University of Washington Press, 2003.
- Frederick F. Travis, George Kennan and the American-Russian Relationship: 1865-1924. Columbus, OH: Ohio University Press, 1990.
