= United States Post Office (Medina, New York) =

- U.S. Post Office
- U.S. National Register of Historic Places
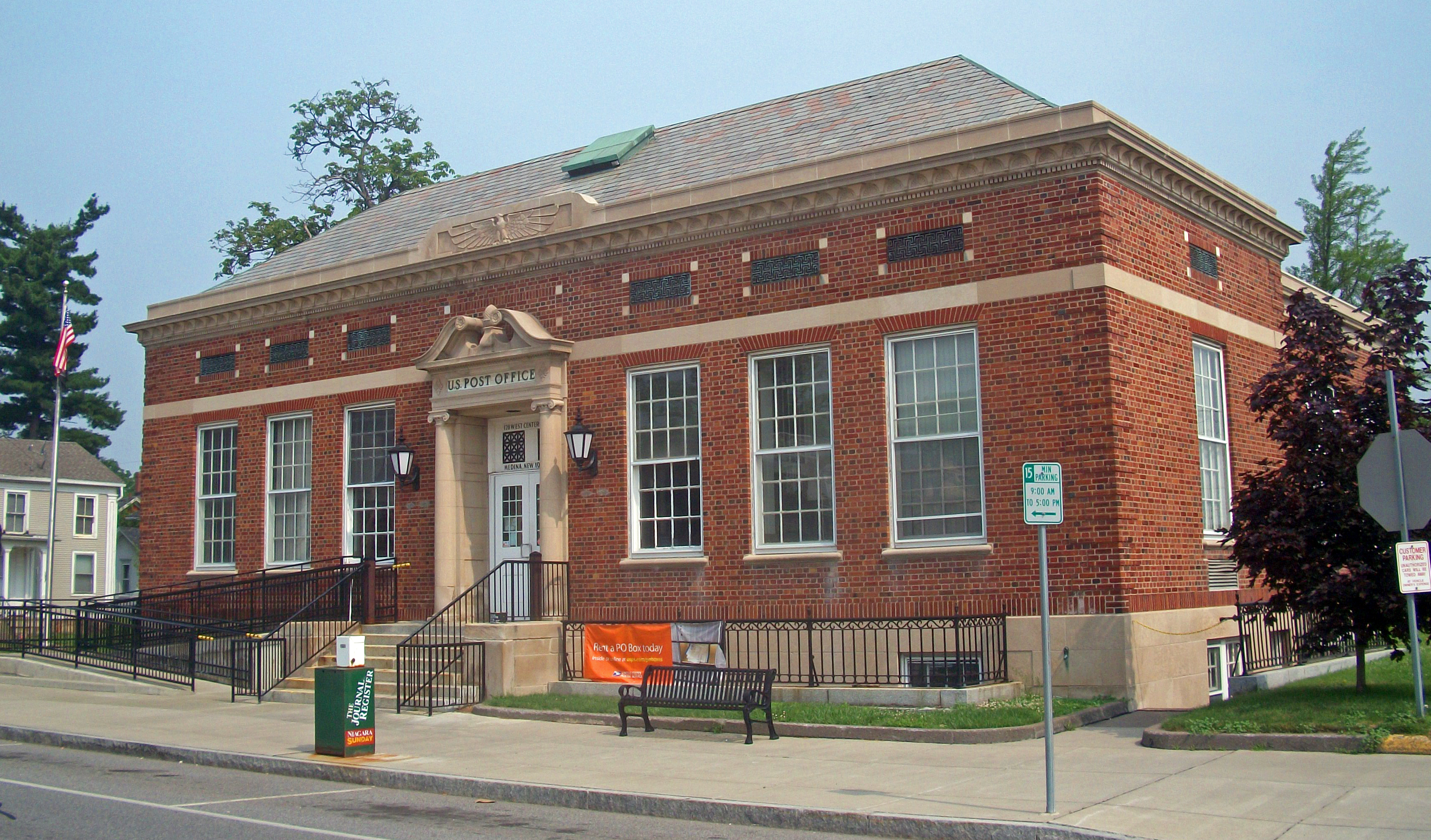
- South elevation and partial east profile, 2010

- Location within New York Location within the United States
- Interactive map showing the location for U.S. Post Office, Medina, New York
- Location: Medina, NY
- Nearest city: Lockport
- Coordinates: 43°13′14″N 78°23′19″W
- Built: 1931
- Architect: Office of the Supervising Architect under James A. Wetmore
- Architectural style: Colonial Revival
- MPS: US Post Offices in New York State, 1858-1943, TR
- NRHP reference No.: 88002351
- Added to NRHP: May 11, 1989

The U.S. Post Office in Medina, New York, is located at West Avenue and West Center Street (state highways 31E and 63). It is a brick building erected in the early 1930s, serving the ZIP Code 14103, covering the village of Medina and neighboring portions of the towns of Ridgeway and Shelby.

Its Colonial Revival style design is unique in the state, where many post office designs of the era were reused in different communities. Only in Salem, Indiana, was the design known to have been reused. In 1989 it was listed on the National Register of Historic Places along with many other present and former post offices in the state. It is one of only two listed on the Register in Orleans County. The other is in Albion.

== Building ==
The post office is located on the northeast corner of the intersection, on the western edge of downtown Medina, where commercial buildings transition to the residential areas of the village. The stone First Baptist Church, built in 1873, is on the southwest corner. On the northwest is an Italianate house that once housed the village's historical society, now just up Prospect near the Ridgeway town hall. Across West Center Street is a former gas station that has been converted into a branch bank, surrounded with a parking lot.

To the east is the main commercial area of the village, later listed on the National Register itself as the Main Street Historic District. On the west is a neighborhood with many of the village's older houses with a few more churches scattered among them. The terrain is generally level. There is a narrow grassy strip in front of the building, with small shrubs on the east and a large nut tree on the west. A driveway on the east leads to parking in the rear, also accessible from West Avenue north of the building.

The building itself is in two sections. On the south (front) is a one-story seven-by-one-bay main block. Its smooth-faced ashlar limestone exposed basement has granite-trimmed window wells with cast iron railings. Above it the post office is faced in brick with rust and blue accents laid in English bond and quoined at the corners. On top the hipped roof is shingled in slate.

Stone trim on the facade includes the flat windowsills, a belt course at the attic line, corner blocks on the iron grilled vents above it corresponding to the windows below, and a denticulated molded cornice with played corbels above that alternate with recessed scalloping. Atop it is a very low parapet, also stone, with a raised frontispiece at the center featuring a carved stone eagle.

The side elevations have a similar treatment. On the north is a three-by-three-bay rectangular wing with flat roof and plain stone cornice. Its windows have the same trim. A small one-by-two-bay wing on the north has a mailing platform on the east side.

Stone steps lead up from the sidewalk to the main entrance, where a wheelchair ramp goes off to the west. The main entrance door is flanked by partially engaged limestone Ionic columns. Above it is a frieze with "U.S. POST OFFICE" carved into it, flanked by carved rosettes. Atop is a molded cornice in a Greek fret pattern topped by a broken pediment with carved swan's neck, patera and large acorn finial.

The double glass doors open into an enameled vestibule with large windows and original interior doors. The lobby has mottled light brown marble wainscoting. Its plaster walls rise to a deep molded frieze and cornice at the ceiling. Other remaining original features are the grille above the door to the postmaster's office and the lockboxes. There is no mural or other public art in the building.

== History ==
Medina's first post office was established in 1824, just before the opening of the Erie Canal. At that time it was operated out of Moore's Tavern, a frequent stopover for both packet boat crews moored in the harbor created by the canal's bend at the village. By 1904 it had moved to rented space on West Center Street.

It was probably at that location in 1928 when Congress authorized a post office building for the village. After the Great Depression began the next year the project was funded. The land was purchased and the existing commercial buildings demolished in early 1931, and the post office opened the following year.

Louis A. Simon, Superintendent of Architects at the Office of the Supervising Architect under James A. Wetmore, was the designer. Simon's design for the Medina post office is, like many others he designed for small towns in New York and other states at that time, in the Colonial Revival style.

Unlike many of those other designs, this particularly ornate one was not reused anywhere else in the state. The only other known instance of its use is in Salem, Indiana. Some elements, such as the limestone belt course at attic level on a seven-bay front facade, did turn up on post offices in New York like the one in Saranac Lake, not listed on the Register due to its extensive alterations.

== See also ==
- National Register of Historic Places listings in Orleans County, New York
