= Medina, New York =

Medina
- Village
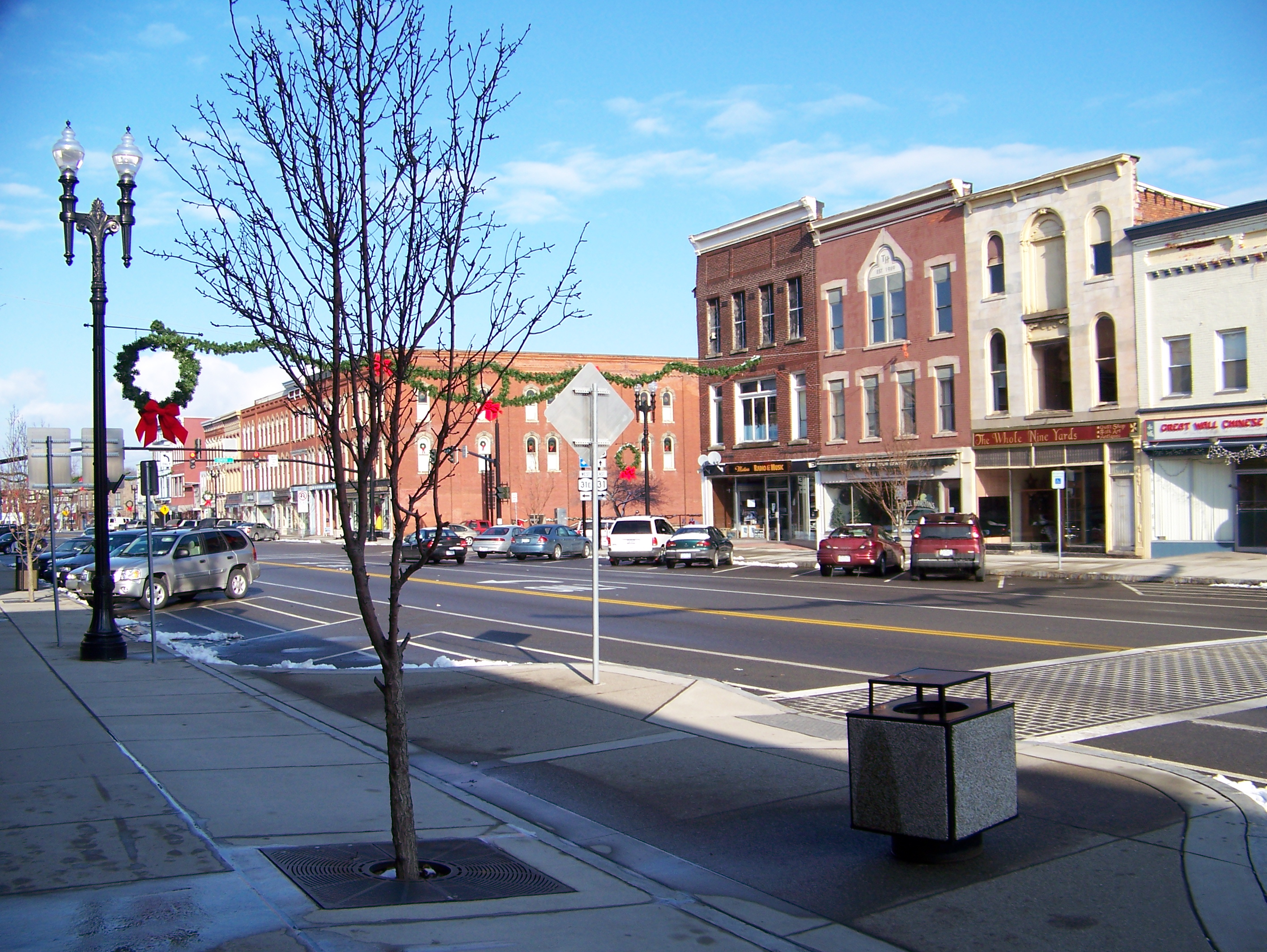
- Main and Center Street junction

- Location in Orleans County and the state of New York.

- Location of New York in the United States
- Coordinates: 43°13′13″N 78°23′12″W
- Country: United States
- State: New York
- County: Orleans
- Settled: 1817
- Incorporated: 1832

Government
  - Type: Mayor–council
  - Mayor: Debbie Padoleski
  - Deputy Mayor: Scott Bieliski

Area
  - Total: 3.37 sq mi (8.74 km^{2})
  - Land: 3.30 sq mi (8.54 km^{2})
  - Water: 0.077 sq mi (0.20 km^{2})
- Elevation: 525 ft (160 m)
- Highest elevation (S border of village near SW corner along NY 31): 1,940 ft (590 m)
- Lowest elevation (Glenwood Lake): 453 ft (138 m)

Population (2020)
  - Total: 6,047
  - Density: 1,833.1/sq mi (707.76/km^{2})
- Time zone: UTC-5 (EST)
  - Summer (DST): UTC-4 (EDT)
- ZIP Code: 14103
- Area code: 585
- FIPS code: 36-46415
- GNIS feature ID: 0956905
- Wikimedia Commons: Medina, New York
- Website: www.VillageMedina.gov

Medina (Note: Pronounced /məˈdaɪnə/ mə-DY-nə) is a village in the towns of Shelby and Ridgeway in Orleans County, New York, United States. It is located approximately 10 miles south of Lake Ontario. As of the 2020 census, Medina had a population of 6,047, making it the county's most populous municipality. The village was named by its surveyor, Ebenezer Mix. It is part of the Rochester Metropolitan Statistical Area. The Medina ZIP Code, 14103, encompasses the village of Medina and the surrounding towns of Ridgeway and Shelby.

The village developed after construction of the Erie Canal, which bends as it passes through the village, creating a basin that served as a stopover point. This became the center of businesses that served trade and passenger traffic on canal boats. In addition, mills were constructed on Oak Orchard Creek to take advantage of its water power. The fertile lands around the village yielded fruit which was exported to major markets of New York City and west via the canal. At the start of the 20th century, Medina was a thriving industrial town.

Medina is located about an hour drive from two major cities, Rochester, to the east, and Buffalo, to the west. It is also about 30 minutes from two small cities, Batavia and Lockport.

== History ==
Joseph Ellicott, the agent of the Holland Land Company, once owned land that encompassed part of the village, purchased from the Holland Land Company. With the opening of the Erie Canal through Medina, the village enjoyed more trade and business associated with freight and passengers on canal boats.

The Village of Medina was incorporated March 3, 1832, creating an entity contained within the two towns of Ridgeway and Shelby. The charter of incorporation called for five Trustees to be elected as village officials. That same year the first printing press was set up in the village and the first newspaper published, The Medina Herald.

In 1852, the railroad arrived in Medina and passenger service quickly became popular.

=== Early Industry ===
Medina's first known industry was an ashery. The area was mostly covered in trees and brush when Ebenezer Mix was assigned to survey the area. Clearing the area would have been necessary for the village to be laid out and the Erie Canal built. An ashery would convert hardwood ash into lye or other usable products. Most of these industries would rely on the Erie Canal for their transportation needs.

==== Mills ====
Medina had a variety of mills over the years. Grain and flour mills were very important to the area and built as early as 1830. Two stave mills existed in the 1870s, producing wood strips for the production of barrels. A Cloth mill also existed for a time though exactly when is not known. Saw mills were used for creating rough lumber and finished boards for other local industry.

==== Barrel Manufacturing ====
The popularity of flour production resulted in a large need for barrels to transport the flour down the Erie Canal.

==== Foundries ====
The Bignall Foundry began selling iron pumps, sinks, and more in 1861. After several fires, the company was part of a consolidation into the Central Foundry Company along with two other local foundries, A.L. Swett Company and Beach & Co in 1899. The Central Foundry focused on soil pipe manufacturing. A.L Swett Iron Works opened in 1871 to manufacture hardware specialties and continued operations in Medina through the 1920s. Beach & Co manufactured plumbing supplies starting in the 1880s.

==== Furniture Manufacturing ====
The Maher Brothers were the first large scale furniture maker in Medina, opening in 1882. The family continued to run the business until 1928. S.A. Cook opened their furniture business around 1882, the Morris chair being among their most popular products. In 1911, Mr. Cook built a large block on Main St which still bears his name today. Another large furniture company of note was the Empire Couch Company. They moved to Medina in 1902. They successfully operated through the widening of the canal in 1913 but could not stay in business during through the Depression, declaring bankruptcy in 1935.

==== Medina Sandstone ====
Medina is known for its Medina Sandstone, a stone used widely in buildings across the region. Some local examples include the "million dollar staircase" at the New York State Capitol in Albany, the Richardson Olmsted Complex in Buffalo, and in buildings at the University of Rochester and Cornell University. Sandstone varies in color from light grey to a deep reddish brown.

The first commercial sandstone quarry was opened in 1837 by John Ryan. At their peak, sandstone quarries were one of the largest employers in the county with upwards of 2,000 employees. With the discovery of cheaper alternatives, Medina Sandstone's popularity began to decline around World War 1.

=== Pearl Street Armory ===
In 1901, a State Armory was built of Medina Sandstone and located on the corner of Pearl St and Prospect Ave. Company F moved into the facility in 1902 with units serving in WWI and WWII. The Armory was officially closed by NYS in 1977. Company F records can found at Lee-Whedon Memorial Library. A bronze statue and memorial was erected in front of the building in honor of Company F in 2019. The building now houses the YMCA.

=== POW Camp ===
Medina's Heinz factory housed a POW camp from 1943 to 1946. Seventy-one Italian soldiers arrived at the Heinz barracks in September 1943. They were allowed to work at the Heinz factory, local farms, or other local factories. In May 1944, the Italian soldiers were moved to a new location and replaced with 116 German soldiers.

During their tenure in Medina, the German prisoners went on strike to protest the smoking regulations at the Heinz factory. The soldiers wanted to smoke in the factory building and on the loading platforms. After having all of their possessions removed and not being allowed to sleep in the barracks, all of the soldiers voluntarily returned to work the following day.

In 1946, the Heinz camp was closed and all remaining prisoners were moved to local military installations in preparation for their return to Germany. During its use, the Heinz barracks housed up to 300 soldiers and 50 military police.

=== Recent history ===
In 2015, village residents voted to keep Medina an incorporated village, despite having the highest effective property tax rate in the Finger Lakes region according to a 2016 Empire Center report.

The Main Street Historic District, Medina Armory, and United States Post Office are listed on the National Register of Historic Places. The Payjack Chevrolet Building was added in 2012 and Boxwood Cemetery in 2015.

== Geography ==
Medina is located at 43°13′11″N 78°23′24″W (43.219808, -78.390101).

According to the United States Census Bureau, the village has a total area of 3.3 square miles (8.5 km^{2}), of which 3.3 square miles (8.5 km^{2}) is land and 0.1 square miles (0.26 km^{2}) (2.39%) is water.

Medina lies at the junction of east–west highway NYS Route 31 and north–south highway NYS Route 63. In addition, Medina marks the location where NYS Route 31E and NYS Route 31A split off from NY-31.

== Demographics ==
Historical population
Census	Pop.	Note	%±
1870	2,821		—
1880	3,632		28.7%
1890	4,492		23.7%
1900	4,716		5.0%
1910	5,683		20.5%
1920	6,011		5.8%
1930	6,071		1.0%
1940	5,871		−3.3%
1950	6,179		5.2%
1960	6,681		8.1%
1970	6,415		−4.0%
1980	6,392		−0.4%
1990	6,686		4.6%
2000	6,415		−4.1%
2010	6,065		−5.5%
2020	6,047		−0.3%
U.S. Decennial Census

=== 2020 census ===
As of the 2020 census, Medina had a population of 6,047. The median age was 40.6 years. 21.4% of residents were under the age of 18 and 19.7% of residents were 65 years of age or older. For every 100 females there were 91.4 males, and for every 100 females age 18 and over there were 88.0 males age 18 and over.

98.9% of residents lived in urban areas, while 1.1% lived in rural areas.

There were 2,584 households in Medina, of which 27.2% had children under the age of 18 living in them. Of all households, 32.1% were married-couple households, 20.7% were households with a male householder and no spouse or partner present, and 35.6% were households with a female householder and no spouse or partner present. About 37.2% of all households were made up of individuals and 15.9% had someone living alone who was 65 years of age or older.

There were 2,820 housing units, of which 8.4% were vacant. The homeowner vacancy rate was 2.4% and the rental vacancy rate was 6.4%.

Racial composition as of the 2020 census
Race	Number	Percent
White	4,978	82.3%
Black or African American	370	6.1%
American Indian and Alaska Native	23	0.4%
Asian	45	0.7%
Native Hawaiian and Other Pacific Islander	3	0.0%
Some other race	165	2.7%
Two or more races	463	7.7%
Hispanic or Latino (of any race)	348	5.8%

=== 2000 census ===
As of the census of 2000, there were 6,415 people, 2,567 households, and 1,576 families residing in the village. The population density was 1,962.1 inhabitants per square mile (757.6/km^{2}). There were 2,796 housing units at an average density of 855.2 per square mile (330.2/km^{2}). The racial makeup of the village was 87.89% White, 7.56% African American, 0.59% Native American, 0.56% Asian, 0.03% Pacific Islander, 1.62% from other races, and 1.75% from two or more races. Hispanic or Latino of any race were 3.83% of the population.

There were 2,567 households, out of which 31.8% had children under the age of 18 living with them, 42.3% were married couples living together, 15.0% had a female householder with no husband present, and 38.6% were non-families. 32.3% of all households were made up of individuals, and 16.3% had someone living alone who was 65 years of age or older. The average household size was 2.41 and the average family size was 3.07.

In the village, the population was spread out, with 26.9% under the age of 18, 7.9% from 18 to 24, 27.2% from 25 to 44, 20.0% from 45 to 64, and 18.0% who were 65 years of age or older. The median age was 37 years. For every 100 females, there were 83.7 males. For every 100 females age 18 and over, there were 80.3 males.

The median income for a household in the village was $30,300, and the median income for a family was $37,857. Males had a median income of $31,857 versus $21,633 for females. The per capita income for the village was $16,138. About 13.0% of families and 16.4% of the population were below the poverty line, including 24.7% of those under age 18 and 4.6% of those age 65 or over.

=== Religion ===
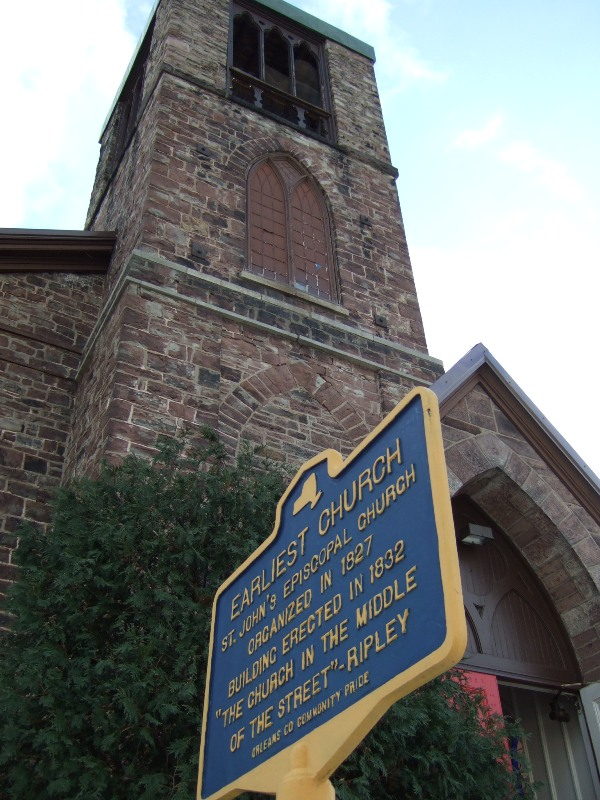
"Church In The Middle of the Street" made of Medina Sandstone

Over the years Medina has been home to many different populations. St. John's Episcopal Church was the first church in Medina, consecrated in 1828. In the following decade, the First United Presbyterian, First Baptist, United Methodist, and St. Mary's Roman Catholic Churches were built. German immigrants started arriving in the 1880s and 1890s and built Trinity Evangelical Lutheran and St. Peter Evangelical Lutheran.

At the turn of the century, the Polish community had grown so large that they built Sacred Heart of Jesus Christ Church in 1910. In 1930, the African American community built Glad Tidings Missionary Baptist Church. Grace Baptist Church, an offshoot from another local Baptist church in Shelby, was built next.

More recently the Church of Jesus Christ of Latter-Day Saints, Fountain of Love, the Islamic Center, Calvary Tabernacle Assembly of God, Grace Covenant, Holiness Pentecostal, and Morning Star of God in Christ have opened. The Church of God Pentecostal purchased the former United Methodist Church in 2016. In 2017, the Akron Free Methodist Church leased the former Sacred Heart Catholic Church and began having services. Of the 15+ churches and religious institutions that have operated in Medina, 11 are still in the village.

Medina is featured in Ripley's Believe It or Not for St. John's Episcopal Church, known as the "Church in the Middle of the Road".

== Government ==
=== Local ===
Medina is governed by a mayor and four trustees. Each position has a two-year term. Elections occur every year. On numerically even years, two trustees and the mayor are up for election. On numerically odd years, the other two trustees are up for election.

=== State ===
- The 62nd Senate District represented by Senator Rob Ortt
- The 139th Assembly District represented by Assemblyman Steve Hawley

=== Federal ===
- The 24th Congressional District, represented by Congresswoman Claudia Tenney
- US Senators representing New York State are Charles Schumer and Kirsten Gillibrand

=== Courts ===
- The 8th Judicial Division of the New York Supreme Court
- The 4th Department of the New York Supreme Court, Appellate Division

== Economy ==
Medina is home to several international, national, and local businesses. Medina is also becoming a tourist attraction because of its historic downtown and location on the Niagara Wine Trail.

=== Business ===
Here is a listing of some of the larger businesses in the area.

- Baxter International- Baxter has one of their many facilities located in Medina. They manufacture a multitude of products for the healthcare industry, including IV infusion pumps and pharmacy automation.
- Velocitii, who specialize in business process outsourcing, opened in 2014. Their 20,000 square foot customer engagement center employs agents able to assist companies both domestic and international with sales, back-office, and customer support. Currently, Velocitii employs over 50 full-time employees across various industries including insurance, healthcare and medical, as well as software and technology.
- Brunner International- Brunner International is a family owned business located in Medina since 1992. A second facility is located in Niagara Falls, NY. They produce parts for commercial vehicles, buses, and trailers.
- Hinspergers Poly Industries- Hinspergers produces protective polyethylene covers.
- Pride Pak Canada- Pride Pak Canada opened a facility in Medina in 2016. They package salads and fresh-cut vegetables.
- Takeform- Takeform, a signage company, is headquartered in Medina. They have won numerous awards in their field and own multiple patents.
- Western New York Energy- In May 2006, New York Governor George Pataki announced the construction in Medina of the first ethanol plant in the Northeastern United States. The plant began receiving deliveries of corn in October 2007 and was expected to start production in November 2007. Partial production began shortly thereafter, and full production was announced by GreenShift Corporation on February 25, 2008. Since that time, the Western New York Energy, LLC plant has been in production, processing significant portions of the local corn crop. In 2022, they expanded the facility to start production of industrial, pharmaceutical, and beverage grade alcohol.

=== Tourism ===
The village of Medina has appeared in several tourism blogs and papers for its events and restaurants.

==== Arts and Entertainment ====
There are several cultural and educational opportunities in Medina. Some examples include Into the Enigma, an interactive escape room, and the Medina Railroad Museum, which is one of the largest railroad and toy train museums in the state of New York. Ripley's Believe It or Not notes Culvert Road as the only place where the Erie Canal passes over an operating road.

Behind the historic downtown buildings, new modern art and murals can be seen. The mural project was an initiative of the non-profit Form Foundation. The first to be painted has been dubbed the 'Canalligator' and was painted in July 2020. The first mural was followed by geometric characters in September, a traveler with his dog and cat in October, and a mural of local pollinator flowers in November. All four murals can be seen behind buildings on the NW side of Main St.

The Orleans Renaissance Group, Inc.is a volunteer organization supporting and promoting the arts, culture and preservation in the greater Medina, New York area. ORG promotes the arts, cultural activities and preservation. Among their initiatives past and present include hosting the Buffalo Philharmonic Orchestra, Anonymous 4, Irish tenor Ronan Tynan; sponsoring the Canal Village Farmers' Market; hosting Medina's locally sourced Farm-to Table Dinner; partnering with local initiatives and organizations; initiating the restoration of Bent's Opera House; co-sponsoring Blue Thursdays summer concert series.

Medina's downtown area has been designated a historic district and listed on the National Register of Historic Places. Bent's Opera House is included in this district, a historic venue for touring performers.

Medina has a variety of bars and restaurants to enjoy. Medina also offers a variety of pizza shops, diners, and fast food options. Medina has one stop on the Niagara Wine Trail: Leonard Oakes Winery has won multiple awards for their wines, including best ice wine in New York.

== Education ==
Medina has two K-12 schools, the Medina Central School District and the Orleans County Christian School. The Medina Central School District is composed of Oak Orchard Primary, Clifford Wise Intermediate and the Medina High School. All three buildings are located on the same campus. The Orleans County Christian School is a non-denominational, multi-church sponsored school.

A branch campus of Genesee Community College, opened in 2007, is also located in Medina.

Medina has one public library which serves the community, Lee-Whedon Memorial Library.

== Culture and recreation ==
=== Park lands ===
The village has seven different parks; all of which are open to the public from dawn until dusk. The majority of parks have swings, slides, and picnic tables; Rotary Park located on Main Street and the Medina Canal Basin park do not.

- Gulf Street Park
- Gwinn Street Park
- John E Butts Memorial Park - Has a skateboard park, and baseball diamonds.
- Medina Canal Basin Park - Offers docking facilities, electrical hook up, pump-out station, and potable water.
- Pine Street Park - Playground with splashpad
- Rotary Park - All Season House, used by Santa in November and December.
- State Street Park - Gazebo

=== Annual events ===
- Ale in Autumn - Enjoy walking around downtown Medina while sampling beers from around the world.
- Beggar's Night - Geared towards children aged 10 and under, trick or treating at Main St. businesses
- Olde Tyme Christmas and Parade of Lights - Annual event held the Saturday after Thanksgiving. Enjoy shopping and activities during the day and fireworks and the Parade of Lights in the evening.
- Wine about Winter - Walk around Medina, sampling local and state wines.
- Sweets in Summer - Sweets tastings throughout the Historic Downtown area.
- Faery Festival - Activities, dancing, and a parade geared towards children.

=== Media ===
Medina had several newspapers throughout the years, starting with The Medina Herald. The Medina Tribune, The Medina Register, and The Medina Daily Journal followed. The Register and Journal merged becoming The Medina Daily Journal and Register. The shortened Medina Journal-Register closed its doors in May 2014.

=== Additional facts ===
One of the oldest homes in Medina stood at 224 Eagle Street, a block from the Erie Canal, on the north side of town. This home was built in the early 1820s and was purchased by the Burnam family in the 1830s. It stayed in the possession of family members until around 1984. The house was torn down in 2012.

The Carl Company was a department store founded as a dry good store in Medina by Charles W. Carl, Sr.

== Notable people ==
- John J. Bagley, former Governor of Michigan, was born and raised in Medina
- Julie Berry (author), children's author
- Silas M. Burroughs, was a former US Congressman who lived in Medina.
- Silas M. Burroughs, son of the former Congressman, was born in Medina and became a notable pharmacist.
- Frances Folsom Cleveland Preston, former First Lady, attended high school in Medina before marrying Grover Cleveland.
- Carl Fischer, former MLB player
- John E. Butts, Second Lieutenant, U.S. Army, Co. E, 60th Infantry, 9th Infantry Division, was awarded the Medal of Honor in WWII
- John Ford, New York State Senator
- George Kennan, author, lecturer and traveler
- Craig Wilson, USA Today columnist
- Melanie Green, professional golfer
