= Payjack Chevrolet Building =

Historic commercial building in New York, United States

- U.S. National Register of Historic Places
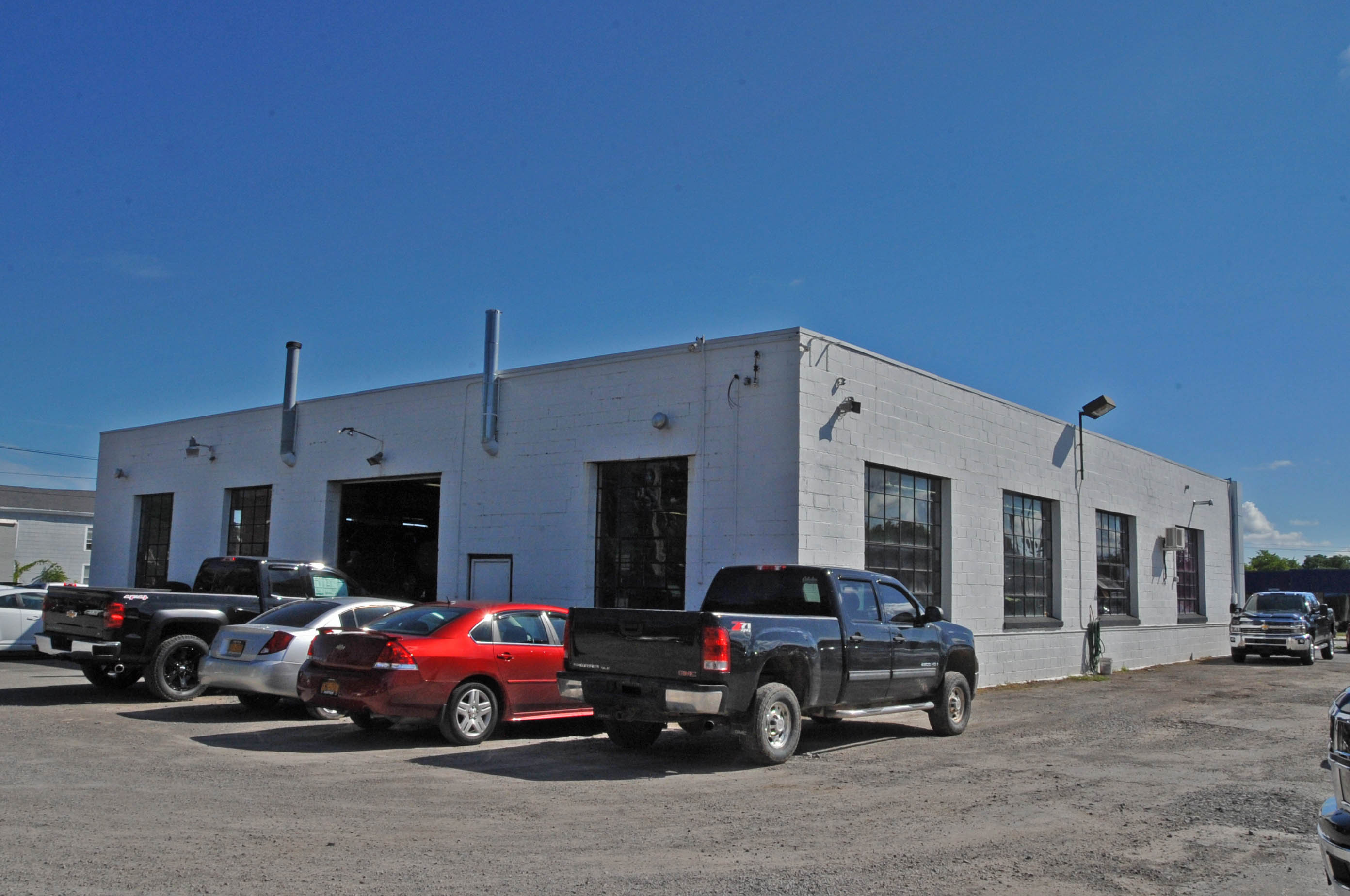
- Payjack Chevrolet Building, January 2008

- Location within New York Location within the United States
- Location: 320 N. Main St., Medina, New York
- Coordinates: 43°13′21″N 78°23′16″W
- Area: Less than 1 acre (0.40 ha)
- Built: 1949
- NRHP reference No.: 12000259
- Added to NRHP: May 8, 2012

Payjack Chevrolet Building is a historic automobile dealership located at Medina in Orleans County, New York. It was built in 1949, and is a one-story concrete building. It is intact example of car dealership facility built to General Motors international standards of that era.

It was listed on the National Register of Historic Places in 2012.
