= Bent's Opera House =

Coordinates: 43.2206°N 78.3873°W

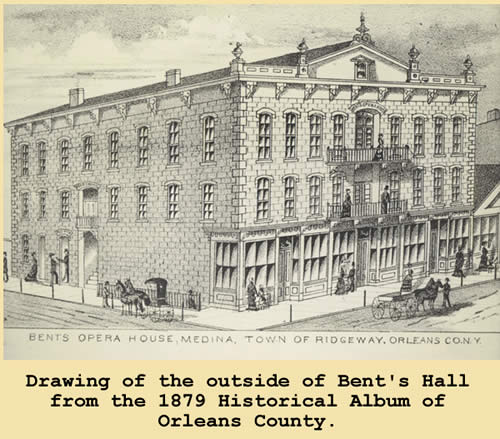
Bent's Opera House

Bent's Opera House, also known as Bent's Hall, is a three-story building located at 444 Main Street in Medina, New York, in the United States. The building is made of Medina Sandstone and features an opera house on the top floor. Construction began in 1864 and was completed early the next year. The building is named for Don Carlos Bent, a local farmer who owned the property and had the structure erected. A formal dedication ceremony was held on February 28, 1865, featuring remarks by a Civil War officer and patriotic pageantry.

For many decades, Bent's Opera House was a prominent venue in Medina for concerts, plays, shows, commencements, elections, and other public functions. P. T. Barnum and William "Buffalo Bill" Cody were among the hundreds of touring performers who brought their talents to the Bent's stage.

As motion pictures and other forms of entertainment became popular in the twentieth century, the Opera House fell into disuse. Yet its legacy was not completely forgotten, as Bent's Hall was included as a contributing property to Medina's Main Street Historic District, which was listed on the National Register of Historic Places in 1995.

In 2010, Bank of America, the building's last commercial owner, donated the Bent's Hall property to the Orleans Renaissance Group, Inc. (ORG), a not-for-profit 501(c)(3) organization dedicated to bringing arts and cultural programs to the greater Medina community. Leaders of ORG hope to restore the Opera House to its former glory as a functioning performance venue.

ORG has since sold Bent's Opera House to Talis Equity. CEO Roger Hungerford is currently renovating and updating the building to include a restaurant, boutique hotel, and a wedding/event venue space.

In 2012, Bent's Opera House was included on the Preservation League of New York State's annual "Seven to Save" list. This list highlights "valued historic resources [that] are in danger of disappearing."
