= Medina Railroad Museum =

Railroad Museum located in Medina, New York, United States

Medina
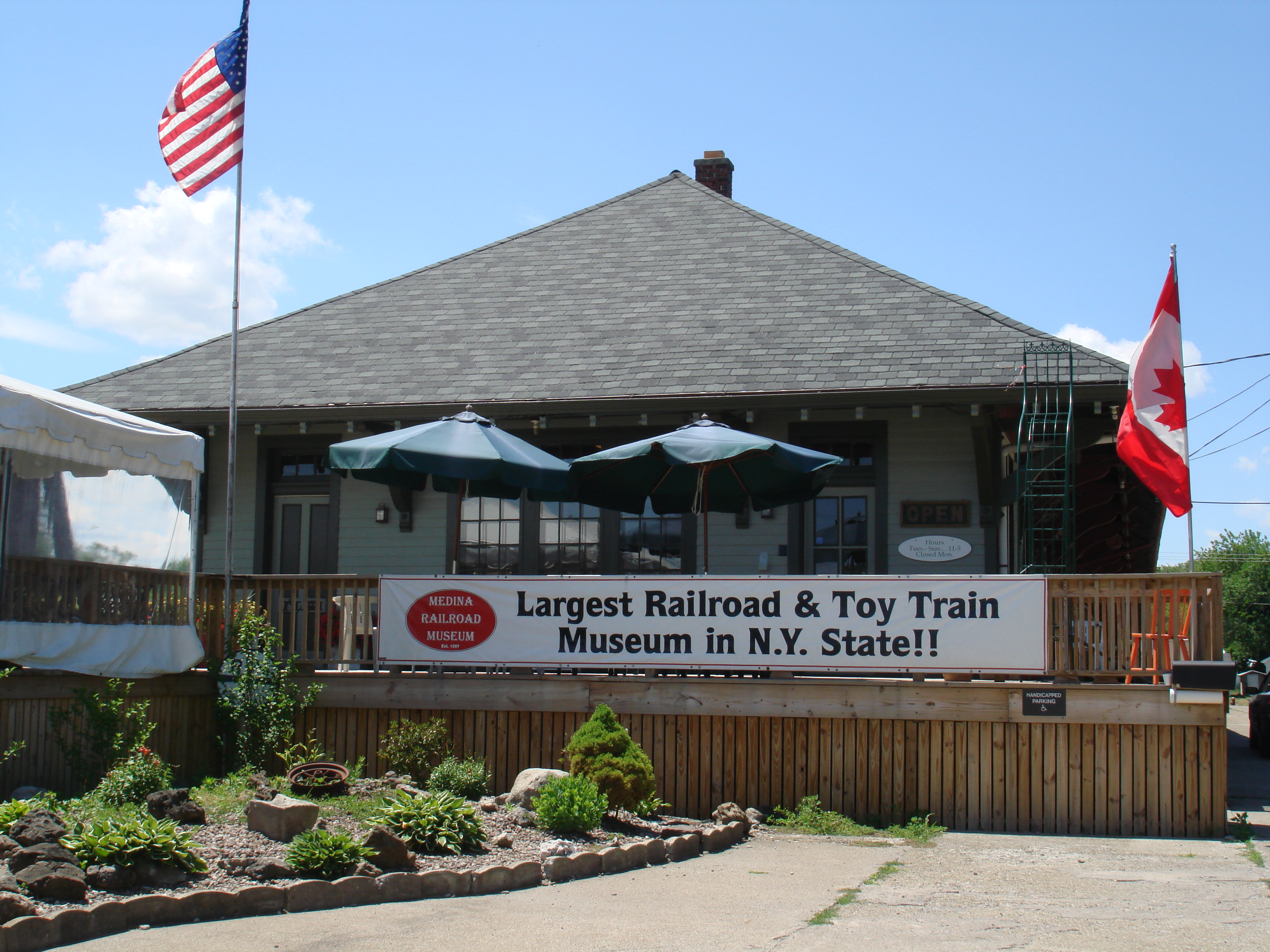
- Medina Railroad Museum

General information
- Location: 530 West Avenue, Medina, Orleans County, New York 14103
- Tracks: 1

Former services
Preceding station	New York Central Railroad	Following station
Middleport toward Niagara Falls, New York	Falls Road	Knowlesville toward Rochester
- Medina Railroad Museum
- U.S. Historic district – Contributing property
- Location within New York Location within the United States
- Location: 530 West Avenue, Medina, New York
- Coordinates: 43°13′5″N 78°23′25″W
- Area: 1.5 acres (0.61 ha)
- Built: 1905
- Part of: Main Street Historic District (Medina, New York) (ID97001457)
- Added to NRHP: November 24, 1997
Location

The Medina Railroad Museum is a railroad museum located at 530 West Avenue in Medina, New York, which is northeast of Buffalo and northwest of Rochester.

The museum is housed in one of the largest standing wooden freight depots, built in 1905.

Its exhibits feature interactive displays, 6000 artifacts, memorabilia, photos, toys and a model railroad, all relating to the railroads of western New York. It also includes a collection of historic fire fighting equipment.

The museum hosts passenger excursion train trips on a seasonal schedule between Medina and Lockport including but not limited to scenic trains, wine trains, Day Out with Thomas and The Polar Express.

In 1997 the boundaries of the village's Main Street Historic District were redrawn to include the building as a contributing property after research established that it was related to other buildings in that district.
