= List of highways in Genesee County, New York =

- Map of Genesee County's highway system

Highway names
- Interstates: Interstate X (I-X)
- US Highways: U.S. Route X (US X)
- State: New York State Route X (NY X)
- County: County Route X (CR X)

System links
- New York Highways; Interstate; US; State; Reference; Parkways

The highway system of Genesee County, New York, comprises 1,037.4 miles (1,669.5 km) of roads maintained by the New York State Department of Transportation, the county, and its towns and villages. 14 state-maintained highways enter the county, which account for a combined 191.6 miles (308.4 km) of the state highway mileage in New York. The state roads are supplemented by 257.9 miles (415.0 km) of county-maintained highways, which carry unsigned county route designations.

== Highways ==
=== Interstate and US Highways ===
Genesee County contains two Interstate Highways: I-90, here part of the New York State Thruway, and I-490, an auxiliary Interstate Highway connecting I-90 to Rochester. I-90 enters Genesee County from Erie County to the west and continues east into Monroe County on its way toward Syracuse and Albany. Genesee County is served by three interchanges: exit 48A for NY 77 in Pembroke; exit 48 for NY 98 near the city of Batavia; and exit 47 for I-490 and NY 19 near the village of Le Roy. From exit 47 of I-90, I-490 heads northeast from the Thruway and intersects NY 19 at exit 1 in the town of Le Roy. It continues on a northeasterly track to the Monroe County line, where the highway connects to NY 33 and NY 33A at exit 2 east of the village of Bergen. I-490 briefly runs along the Genesee–Monroe county line before leaving Genesee County and continuing toward Rochester.

Along with the two Interstate Highways, Genesee County is also served by US 20. The route travels east–west through the southern part of the county and is named Broadway. Most of this section of the route serves rural areas; however, in the town of Darien, US 20 passes by Darien Lakes State Park and Darien Lake near a junction with NY 77.

=== State touring routes ===
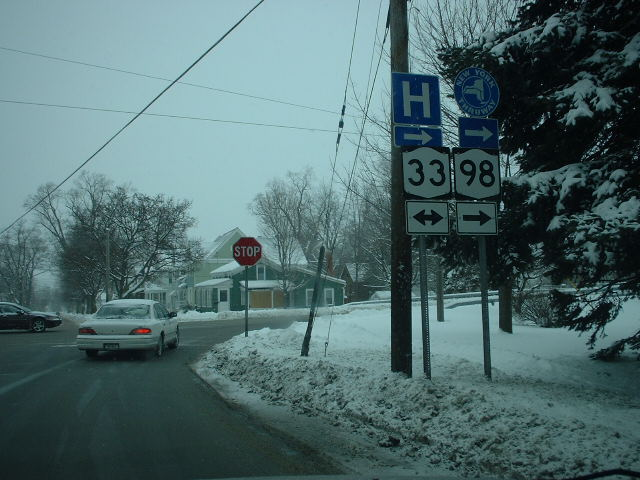
NY 98 at NY 33 in Batavia

11 state touring routes enter Genesee County at some point along their routing.

==== NY 5 ====
NY 5 is a busy east–west route that enters Genesee County and the town of Pembroke from Erie County and the town of Newstead. It is named Main Street when it enters the county and intersects NY 77 in Pembroke. NY 5 travels through predominantly rural areas until reaching the city of Batavia where it intersects NY 98 and also runs concurrent with NY 63 and NY 33 for a short distance through the city. NY 5 closely parallels I-90 (the New York State Thruway) through much of the county. The road travels eastward, intersecting NY 237 in Stafford and NY 19 in the village of Le Roy before leaving Genesee County and entering Livingston County and the village of Caledonia.

==== NY 19 ====
NY 19 enters the county from Wyoming County to the south. Almost immediately after the county line, Route 19 stops at a traffic light with NY 63 in the hamlet of Pavilion. The similarly named but smaller Pavilion Center marks the junction with US 20, 2.3 miles thereafter. NY 19 continues north through the eastern part of the county and intersects the state's other major east–west route, NY 5 in the village of Le Roy.

As Route 19 continues north it descends the Onondaga Escarpment. Shortly afterwards, it crosses the I-90 segment of the New York State Thruway just west of the I-490 exit. While NY 19 is signed for this exit along the Thruway, access to it comes via the first exit on I-490, which is accessed via connector roads as the two highways do not directly intersect. North of the Thruway, NY 19 intersects NY 33 and NY 262 at the village of Bergen. Several miles later, after passing the Bergen Swamp Wildlife Refuge, it crosses the Monroe County line.

==== NY 33 ====
NY 33 is a two-laned route named Genesee Street as it enters Genesee County from Erie County to the west. It intersects with NY 77 in the center of the first community it encounters, the small village of Corfu. At the Batavia town line, NY 33 becomes Pearl Street, a name it keeps until it reaches NY 98 within the city of Batavia, the Genesee County seat. NY 33 crosses and briefly overlaps not only NY 5, the other east–west route in town, but both north–south routes, NY 63 and NY 98. To the east of the city, Route 33 splits in a northeast direction from Route 5, becoming Clinton Street, then, once outside the city limits, Clinton Street Road. It passes Genesee Community College, then, continuing its northward slant, crosses under I-90 (the Thruway) with no exit.

It remains close to the Thruway for a few miles, intersecting NY 237 less than a mile north of its overpass, but then leaves it behind for good shortly thereafter as it turns even more to the north. NY 33 enters the small village of Bergen in the county's northeast corner, where NY 33 crosses the long north–south route NY 19. Shortly after, NY 33 intersects NY 33A's west end near the Monroe County line. NY 33A intersects I-490 just east of here as NY 33A picks up 33's course as the main route. NY 33 turns to the north yet again, now with the name Buffalo Road as it leaves Genesee County for Monroe County.

==== NY 33A ====
NY 33A begins at a three-way intersection with NY 33 in Bergen. From this point, Route 33 travels to the west and to the northeast while NY 33A heads east. Less than a quarter of a mile from its western terminus, Route 33A connects to I-490 at exit 2, located on the Genesee–Monroe county line. While the expressway and the western on-ramps are located in Genesee County, the eastern ramps are situated in the Monroe County town of Riga. Route 33A passes into Monroe County immediately after crossing I-490 eastbound.

==== NY 63 ====
NY 63 enters Genesee County from the southeast and immediately intersects the northern end of NY 246. A mile to the northwest of that intersection, NY 63 drops down slightly to intersect with NY 19 at Pavilion. After the traffic light at the center of the hamlet, NY 63 crosses Oatka Creek and climbs back up out of the Wyoming Valley. The roadway narrows again and continues due northwest to its next junction, the underdeveloped crossing of US 20. NY 63 acquires the name Ellicott Street when it finally enters the city of Batavia, where it intersects the two major east–west trunk routes in this corridor, NY 5 and NY 33, as well as north–south NY 98, which takes traffic to the Thruway.

Past Batavia, NY 63 itself crosses the Thruway without an exit. It continues northwestward as Lewiston Road to the village of Oakfield, where NY 262 has its western terminus. Finally, just north of Oakfield, NY 63 turns due west on Judge Road and follows it several miles to NY 77, which it joins traveling north of Basom, a hamlet in the town of Alabama. At Alabama, NY 77 turns to the west to head to Lockport and NY 63 continues northwards, across the Iroquois National Wildlife Refuge and into Orleans County toward Medina.

==== NY 77 ====
NY 77 enters Genesee County from Wyoming County from the south. NY 77 intersects busy US 20 at the hamlet of Darien, just north lies Darien Lake amusement park to the east of the highway. The road, however, remains a two-lane blacktop as it continues north past the village of Corfu, where it intersects NY 33 and, several miles further on, Brick House Corners, the intersection with NY 5.

Just beyond that junction the truck stops and toll plaza associated with the Thruway (I-90) exit 48A are visible as the road dips slightly, then makes its first major bend to cross over the Thruway. Past the Thruway, it once again continues ahead due north to where it crosses the Tonawanda Creek north of the hamlet of Indian Falls. The falls themselves are visible from the road. North of the falls, the land once again becomes mostly fields, although some are marked with signage for the nearby Iroquois National Wildlife Refuge. At the small hamlet of Basom, NY 63 comes in from the east, starting the only concurrency along Route 77.

The concurrency ends at Alabama, several miles further north, where NY 77 turns to the west as NY 63 takes over the northbound route. NY 77 from NY 63 to the Niagara County line is maintained by Genesee County as CR 12 (Lewiston Road), though CR 12 continues east of NY 63 and NY 77 along Lewiston, Lockport and North Byron roads to CR 7 (Barrville and North Bergen roads) northeast of the village of Elba.

==== NY 98 ====
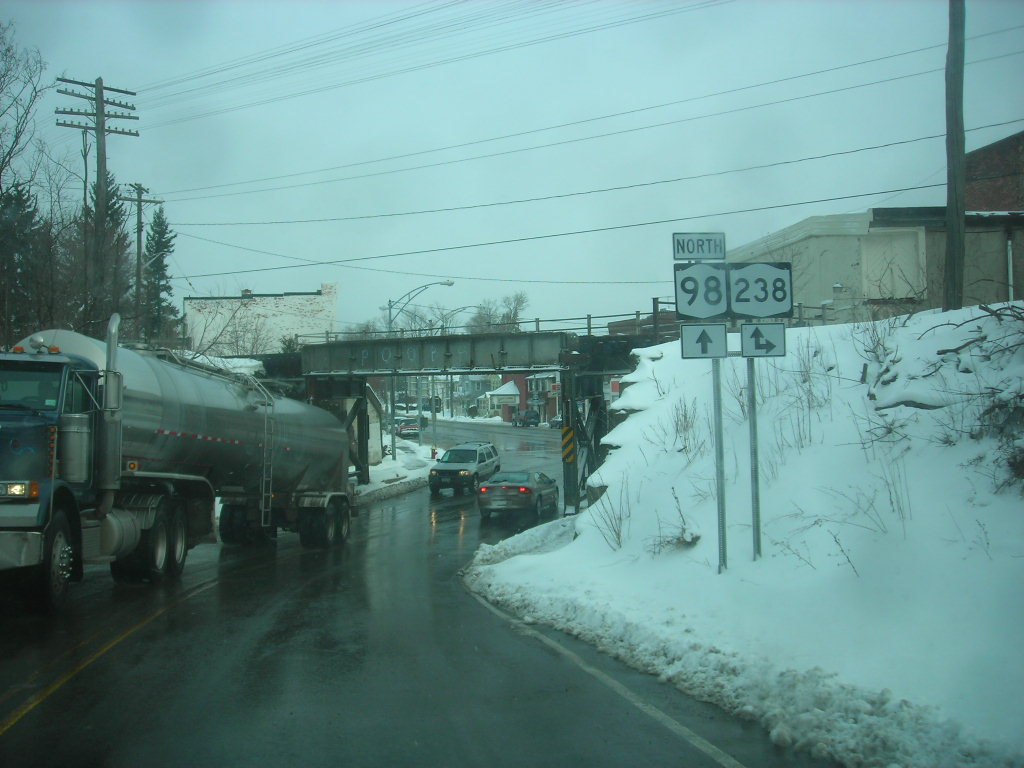
NY 238's junction with NY 98 in the village of Attica

NY 98 enters Genesee County from Wyoming from the south. In the town of Alexander, NY 98 becomes Alexander Road and connects with US 20 at an interchange in the village of Alexander. The Alexander Road name remains through Alexander, past CSX Transportation's Rochester Subdivision rail line in the town of Batavia (which NY 98 passes under), and up to the Batavia city limits, where it becomes Walnut Street. Within the city, NY 98 crosses the Depew, Lancaster and Western Railroad at-grade before curving onto South Main Street and intersecting NY 33. The two routes join on Oak Street for one block to cross over Tonawanda Creek. On the opposite bank, NY 33 separates from NY 98 at an intersection with NY 5 and NY 63. NY 98, however, continues north through the city on Oak Street to the northern city limits, where it interchanges with the New York State Thruway (I-90) south of the Genesee County Airport.

To the north of Batavia in the village of Elba, NY 98 overlaps NY 262 through the southern edge of the village before continuing through the village and into the town of Elba. Shortly thereafter, NY 98 crosses county lines by entering the Orleans County and the town of Barre.

==== NY 237 ====
NY 237 begins at an intersection with NY 5 in the town of Stafford. It heads north to Morganville, where the route takes on a northeast alignment for a brief distance before resuming a northerly alignment south of the Thruway (I-90). NY 237 crosses over the Thruway and meets NY 33, which parallels the Thruway along this stretch. The route continues north through South Byron, passing under the CSX Rochester Subdivision here, before approaching Byron. In the town center, NY 237 meets NY 262. Route 237 continues north through the hamlet of Pumpkin Hill before crossing into Orleans County.

==== NY 238 ====
NY 238 continues on a northwest path into the town of Alexander from the Orleans County village of Attica. NY 238 then heads into the town of Darien. It closely follows Norfolk Southern Railway's Buffalo Line through this area, and is mirrored by CR 45 on the opposite side of the tracks, which terminates at NY 238 at both ends. After CR 45's western terminus, NY 238 turns more northward again, entering a residential area and terminating at US 20 in Darien.

==== NY 246 ====
NY 246, named Perry Road, lies primarily within Wyoming County; however, it crosses into Genesee County for less than a tenth of a mile to reach a junction with NY 63 in the town of Pavilion.

==== NY 262 ====
NY 262 is entirely located within Genesee County. It begins in the village of Oakfield at a junction with NY 63 and is named Drake Street. NY 262 heads east to the village of Elba where it intersects NY 98 and turns south and has a brief concurrency until it turns east again as Ford Road. As NY 262 continues east and its name changes to Byron-Elba Road until it intersects north–south NY 237 in Byron. After the intersection NY 262 is named Townline Road for the rest of its six-mile length to its east end at NY 19 in the village of Bergen.

=== Former routes ===
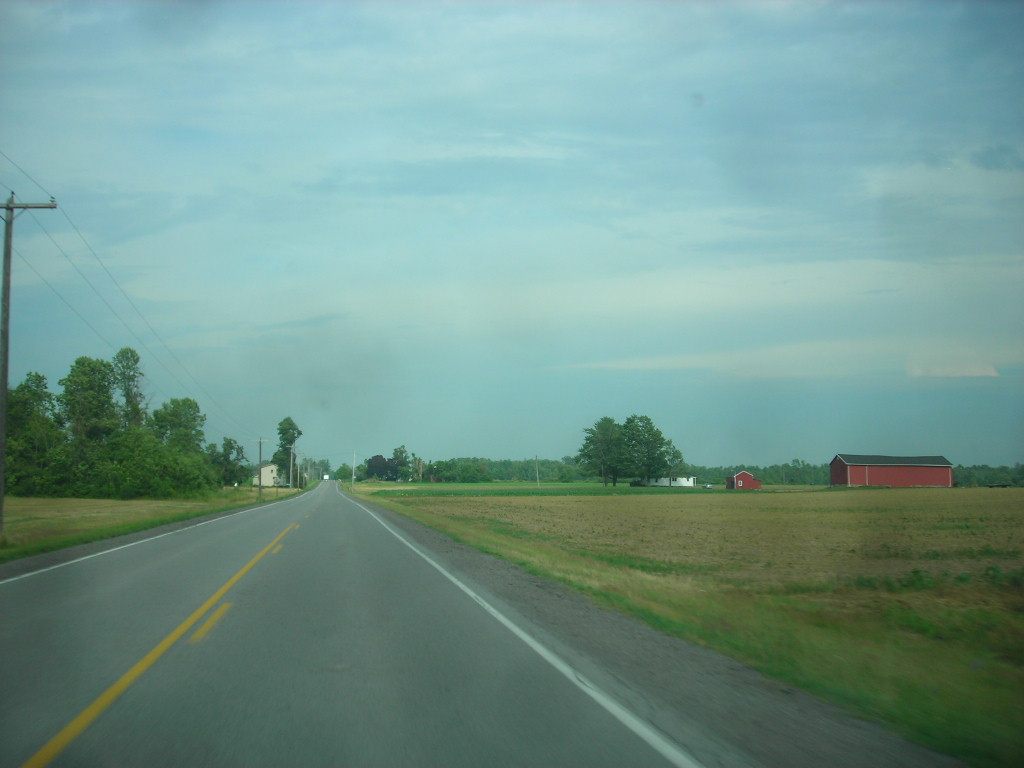
Former NY 267

Four additional state touring routes—NY 35, NY 62, NY 77A, and NY 267—entered Genesee County at one time, but no longer do after they were absorbed by other routes or ceased to be a touring route in any form.

==== NY 35 ====
When U.S. Highways were first signed in New York in 1927, US 20 was routed on modern US 20A between Hamburg and Avon. Its current routing between Depew and Avon became part of NY 35, which also served downtown Buffalo. US 20 was rerouted to follow its current alignment between Hamburg and Avon in the late 1930s, replacing NY 35.

==== NY 62 ====
NY 62 was designated by 1926 to present-day NY 19 between Belvidere and Pavilion, as well as current NY 63 from Pavilion to Lake Ontario. In the 1930 renumbering of state highways in New York, NY 62 became the basis for the new NY 19, which was replaced by a realigned NY 63 north of Pavilion by 1938.

==== NY 77A and NY 267 ====
NY 77A was assigned to Bloomingdale Road in the town of Alabama from the 1930s to 1942. NY 77A ran from NY 267 at the Erie County line east to NY 77 in Basom. By 1942, the designation of NY 77A was removed and the NY 267 designation was extended eastward over NY 77A to a new terminus at NY 77 in Basom. The NY 267 designation was completely removed on August 14, 1980.

=== County routes ===
The Genesee County Highway Department is responsible for maintaining 257 miles (414 km) of county roads, 380 bridges and culverts, the Genesee County Airport and the Genesee County Parks, Recreation and Forestry Division. County routes in Genesee County are not signed; however, the number is given, along with house numbers, on intersection blade signs. County routes generally comprise one or more named roads strung together to form a single continuous unit. These usually extend for some distance, connecting primary highways in two or more towns. The majority of the county's roads are assigned to the towns, while most of the county-maintained roads serve as connections between major routes in the county.

== List of Interstate, US, and state highways ==
The "Formed" and "Removed" columns reflect when the route was extended into or eliminated within Genesee County; likewise, the "Length" columns reflect the road's length within the county.

Route	Length (mi)	Length (km)	Formed	Removed
I-90	29.13	46.88	1957	—
I-490	4.09	6.58	1974	—
US 20	27.02	43.48	1926	—
NY 5	28.61	46.04	1930	—
NY 19	19.90	32.03	1930	—
NY 33	30.35	48.84	1920s	—
NY 33A	0.28	0.45	by 1938	—
NY 35	27.02	43.48	1920s	1938
NY 62	28.44	45.77	1920s	1930
NY 63	29.64	47.70	1930	—
NY 77	20.54	33.06	1930	—
NY 77A	4.80	7.72	1930s	1942
NY 98	19.94	32.09	1930	—
NY 237	10.69	17.20	1930	—
NY 238	3.98	6.41		—
NY 246	0.09	0.14		—
NY 262	10.44	16.80		—
NY 267	4.80	7.72	1942	1980
