= List of county routes in Genesee County, New York =

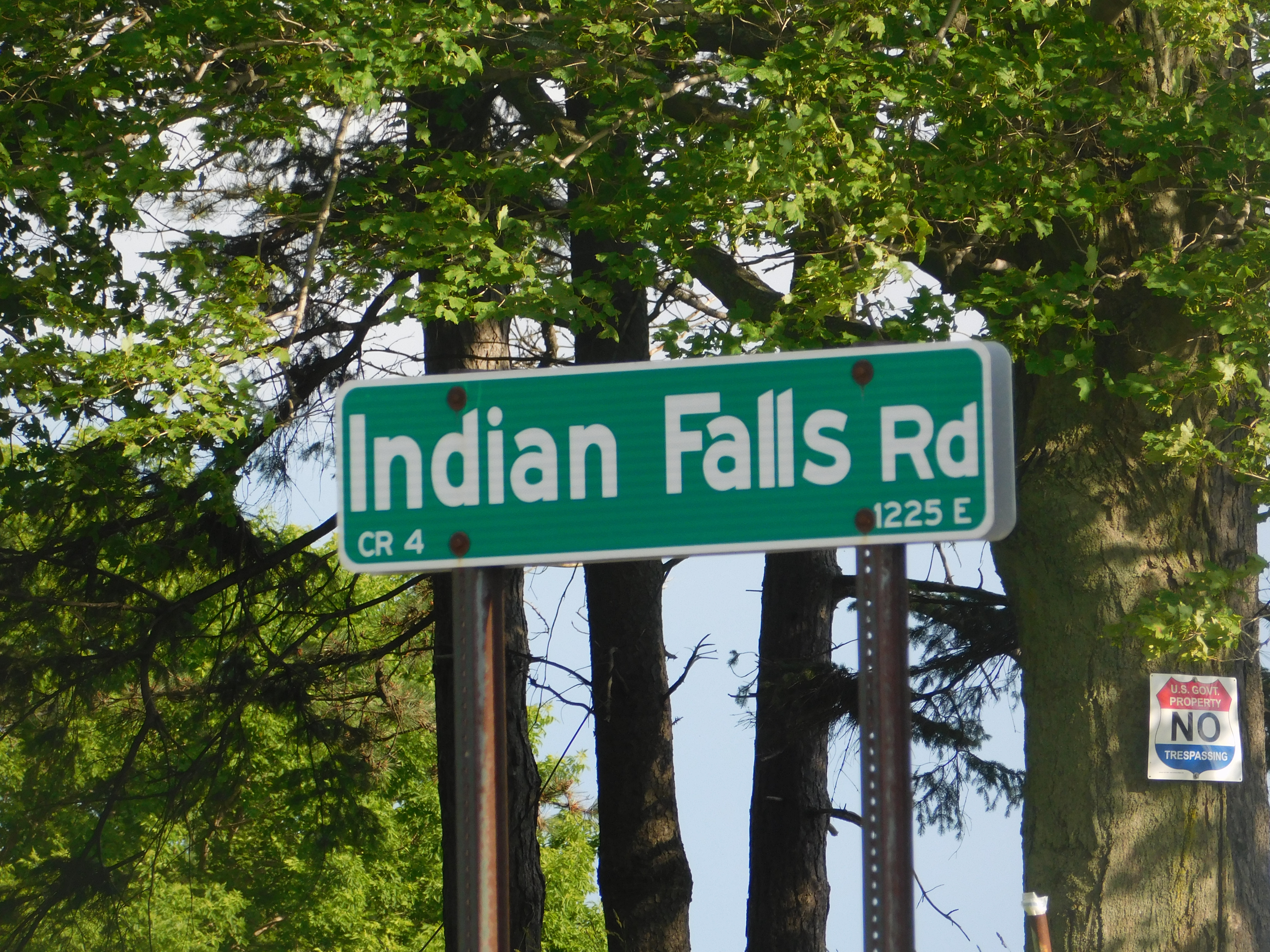
- Standard Genesee County blade sign, with the road's county route number in small text at lower left. (CR 4 in Pembroke)

Highway names
- Interstates: Interstate X (I-X)
- US Highways: U.S. Route X (US X)
- State: New York State Route X (NY X)
- County: County Route X (CR X)

System links
- New York Highways; Interstate; US; State; Reference; Parkways

County routes in Genesee County, New York, are not posted on route markers. However, the number is given, along with house numbers, often on intersection blade signs. There is no apparent numbering pattern.

County routes generally comprise one or more named roads, or portions thereof, strung together to form a single continuous unit. These usually extend for some distance, connecting primary highways in two or more towns. The majority of the county's roads are assigned to the towns. Nowhere does any county route wholly enter either a village or the city of Batavia.

== Routes 1–25A ==
Route	Length (mi)	Length (km)	From	Via	To	Notes
CR 1	9.96	16.03	NY 98 in Alexander town	Stroh, Sandpit, Brookville and Creek roads	Batavia city line	
CR 2	6.21	9.99	NY 63 in Bethany	East Bethany–Le Roy Road	NY 5 in Le Roy town	
CR 2A	0.09	0.14	CR 2	Munson Street in Le Roy town	Le Roy village line	
CR 3	7.38	11.88	Wyoming county line in Pavilion	South Street and Union Corners Road	Le Roy village line	
CR 4	11.04	17.77	US 20 in Darien	Harlow, Fargo, Lake, Lake Gabbey and Indian Falls roads	NY 5 in Pembroke	
CR 5	7.58	12.20	US 20 in Alexander town	Gillate, Walker, Hickox, Halstead, Wilkinson and Hartsthorn roads	NY 5 in Batavia town	Gap in designation at CR 21
CR 6	4.72	7.60	Church Street	Swamp and West Sweden roads in Bergen town	Reed Road	
CR 7	6.12	9.85	Elba village line	Barrville and North Byron roads	NY 237 in Byron	
CR 8	4.96	7.98	CR 34 in Stafford	Randall Road	NY 19 in Le Roy	
CR 8A	0.28	0.45	CR 8	Richmond Road in Stafford	NY 237	
CR 9	4.41	7.10	Lewiston Road	Albion Road in Oakfield	Orleans county line	
CR 10	3.17	5.10	NY 63	York Road in Pavilion	Livingston county line	
CR 11	3.36	5.41	Erie county line	Akron Road in Pembroke	NY 77	
CR 12	17.33	27.89	Niagara county line	Lewiston, Lockport and North Byron roads	CR 7 in Elba	Section between the Niagara county line and NY 63 is co-designated with NY 77
CR 13	12.10	19.47	NY 237 in Byron	Town Line and Bank Street roads, Bank Street	NY 262 in Byron	Section between the NY 237 and NY 19 is co-designated with NY 262
CR 14 (1)	4.61	7.42	NY 237 in Byron	North Bergen and Reed roads	CR 6 in Bergen	
CR 14 (2)	0.81	1.30	CR 6	North Bergen and Reed roads in Bergen	Monroe county line	
CR 15	7.49	12.05	Silver Road in Bethany	Linden and Bethany Center roads	NY 63 in Stafford	
CR 15A	0.50	0.80	Wyoming county line	Skates Hill Road in Bethany	CR 15	
CR 16	4.19	6.74	Oakfield village line	Pearl Street and Maltby Road	Elba village line	
CR 17 (1)	0.76	1.22	NY 19	Parmelee Road in Le Roy town	NY 19	
CR 17 (2)	3.63	5.84	CR 17 (1)	Oatka Trail in Le Roy town	Monroe county line	
CR 19	5.26	8.47	NY 33 in Batavia town	Batavia–Stafford, Byron and Walker Corners roads	NY 237 in Byron	
CR 19A	10.60	17.06	CR 19 in Byron	Byron, Warboys and Creamery roads	NY 19 in Bergen	Gap in designation at CR 6
CR 19B	6.05	9.74	NY 63 in Bethany	Fargo, Fargo–Prole, and Prole–East Prole roads	CR 19 in Stafford	
CR 20	1.25	2.01	CR 3	Walker Road in Pavilion	Livingston county line	
CR 21	12.82	20.63	Erie county line	Sumner, Simonds, Bennett and Dodgeson roads	NY 98 in Alexander town	
CR 22	2.44	3.93	CR 12 in Alabama	Lewiston Road	NY 63 in Oakfield town	
CR 23	4.78	7.69	NY 63	Knowlesville Road in Alabama	Orleans county line	
CR 24	3.64	5.86	NY 98	Oak Orchard Road in Elba town	Orleans county line	
CR 25	3.08	4.96	NY 5	Circular Hill and Gulf roads in Le Roy town	Monroe county line	
CR 25A	1.70	2.74	CR 25	Circular Hill Road in Le Roy town	CR 17 (2)	

== Routes 26–151 ==
Route	Length (mi)	Length (km)	From	Via	To	Notes
CR 26	10.57	17.01	NY 77 in Alabama	Ledge and Town Line roads	NY 98 in Batavia town	
CR 28	3.33	5.36	CR 2 in Bethany	Clipnock Road	NY 5 in Stafford	
CR 30	5.79	9.32	NY 5 in Pembroke	Slusser and Macomber roads	NY 63 in Oakfield	
CR 31	6.63	10.67	NY 19 in Le Roy town	West Bergen Road	Town Line Road in Bergen town	
CR 32	4.87	7.84	Indian Falls Road in Pembroke	Pratt and Kelsey roads	NY 5 in Batavia town	
CR 34	3.11	5.01	NY 237	Morganville and Horseshoe Lake roads in Stafford	NY 33	
CR 35	4.37	7.03	Wyoming county line	East Road in Bethany	NY 63	
CR 36	0.38	0.61	Wyoming county line	Darien–Alexander Town Line Road	CR 45 in Darien	
CR 37	3.81	6.13	Batavia city line	South Main Street and Wortendyke roads in Batavia town	NY 5	
CR 38	5.21	8.38	US 20 in Bethany	Francis, Putnam Settlement and Shepard roads	NY 63 in Batavia town	
CR 39	6.16	9.91	Wyoming county line	Starr, Cook, Hartwell, Junction, and Covell roads	East Bethany–Le Roy Road in Stafford	
CR 40	3.34	5.38	NY 19	North Road in Le Roy town	Monroe county line	
CR 41	0.66	1.06	CR 14	South Holley Road in Byron	Orleans	
CR 42	3.62	5.83	CR 19 in Byron	Walkers Corners and Transit roads	Watson Road in Elba town	
CR 43	0.24	0.39	NY 77	Salt Road in Alabama	Orleans county line	
CR 45	2.12	3.41	NY 238 in Darien	Attica Road	NY 238 in Alexander town	
CR 46 (1)	1.92	3.09	NY 98	West and East Saile drives in Batavia town	CR 13	
CR 46 (2)	0.06	0.10	CR 46 (1)	Airport Road in Batavia town	Genesee County Airport	
CR 47	1.56	2.51	CR 1 in Bethany	Putnam Road	CR 38 in Batavia town	
CR 48	1.54	2.48	Bank Street	Assembly R. Stephen Hawley Drive in Batavia town	Batavia–Stafford Road	
CR 49	1.49	2.40	CR 15	Raymond Road in Bethany	CR 35	
CR 50	6.36	10.24	NY 63 in Pavilion	Perry Road	NY 19 in Le Roy town	
CR 51	4.50	7.24	US 20 in Darien	Colby Road	NY 33 in Pembroke	
CR 52	1.87	3.01	Bethany Center Road	Memory Lane in Bethany	CR 49	
CR 53	0.38	0.61	Dead end	Call Parkway in Batavia town	CR 46	
CR 54	1.63	2.62	NY 63	Agpark Drive South and North in Batavia town	NY 5	
CR 55	1.51	2.43	CR 56	Crosby Road in Alabama	NY 77	
CR 56	1.11	1.79	NY 63/NY 77	Judge Road in Alabama	Tonawanda Indian Reservation	
CR 57	0.63	1.01	CR 55	Stamp Road in Alabama	Alleghany Road	
CR 151	0.37	0.60	US 20	Old Telephone Road in Bethany	US 20	

== See also ==
- County routes in New York
- Highways in Genesee County, New York
