= New York State Route 262 =

State highway in Genesee County, New York, US

New York State Route 262
- Map of Genesee County in western New York with NY 262 highlighted in red

Route information
- Maintained by NYSDOT and Genesee County
- Length: 17.03 mi (27.41 km)
- Existed: 1930–present

Major junctions
- West end: NY 63 in Oakfield
- East end: NY 19 in Bergen

Location
- Country: United States
- State: New York
- Counties: Genesee

Highway system
- New York Highways; Interstate; US; State; Reference; Parkways
← NY 261	→ NY 263

New York State Route 262 (NY 262) is an east–west state highway in Genesee County, New York, in the United States. It extends for 17.03 miles (27.41 km) across mostly rural areas dominated by cultivated fields, connecting NY 63 in the village of Oakfield to NY 19 in the village of Bergen. In between, the two-lane NY 262 serves the village of Elba and the hamlet of Byron, where it meets NY 98 and NY 237. NY 262 is situated several miles north of the New York State Thruway (Interstate 90 or I-90) and follows a routing parallel to that of the Thruway. The route was assigned as part of the 1930 renumbering of state highways in New York to a more northerly routing between Elba and Byron, but gradually moved onto its current Oakfield–Bergen alignment through a series of changes in the following decades.

== Route description ==
NY 262 begins at an intersection with NY 63 in the business district of the village of Oakfield. It heads east as a two-lane highway named Drake Street, serving three blocks of homes before leaving the village for a rural area of the town of Oakfield. NY 262 continues generally eastward across farmlands, following a similar routing to that of the New York State Thruway (I-90), located 4 miles (6 km) to the south. After 3.5 miles (5.6 km) in the towns of Oakfield and Elba, NY 262 reaches the sparsely populated southern portion of the village of Elba, where it meets NY 98 at South Main Street. The two routes overlap for one block along South Main Street to Ford Road, where NY 262 leaves NY 98 and continues northeastward through the remainder of the village.

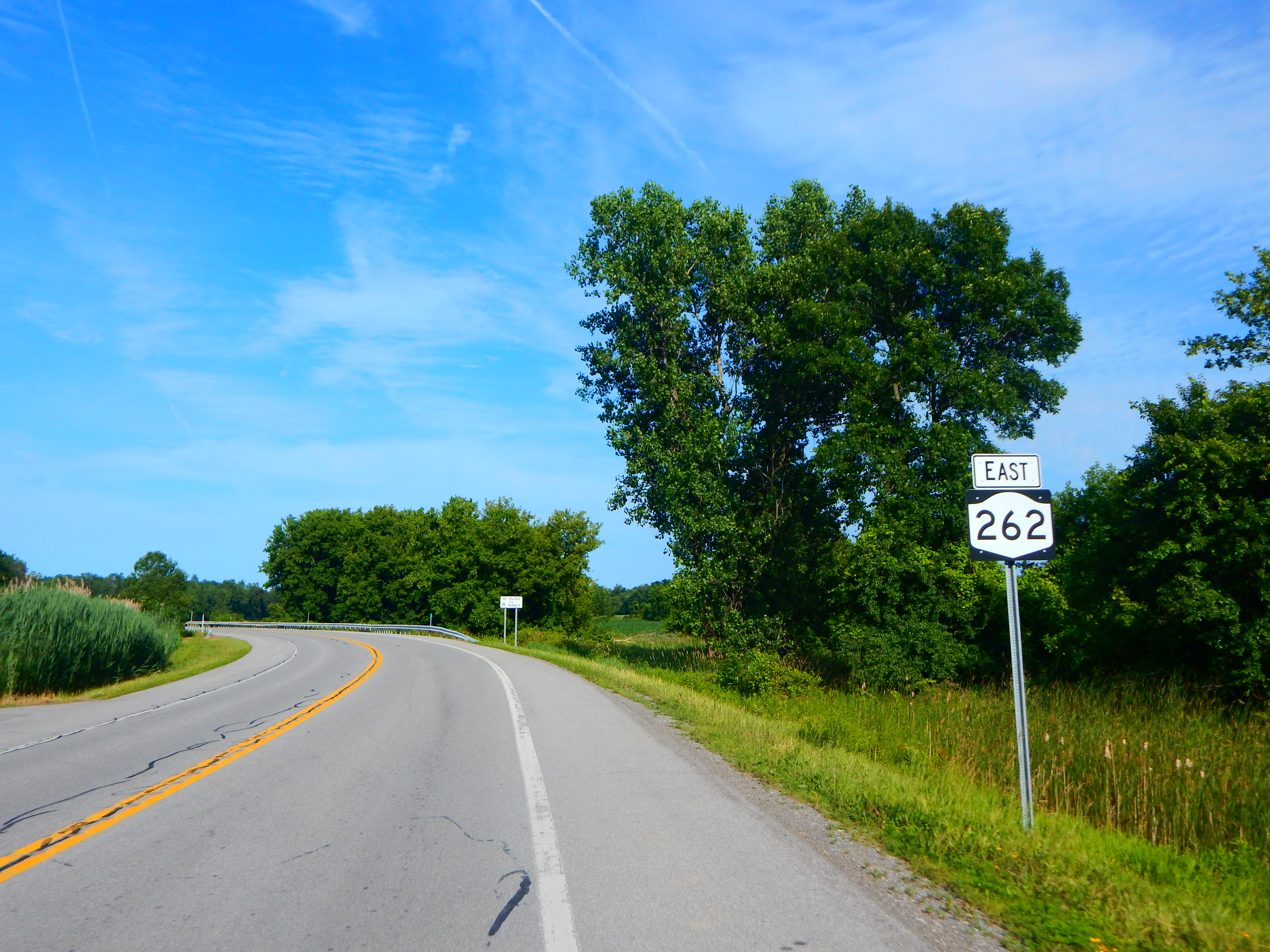
NY 262 east of NY 98 in Elba

Outside of Elba village, NY 262 heads east-northeast across a mixture of farmlands and undeveloped fields to the town of Byron, becoming Byron–Elba Road at the town line. Not far to the east is the hamlet of Byron, situated around NY 262's junction with NY 237. At this point, ownership and maintenance of NY 262 shifts from the New York State Department of Transportation to Genesee County, which maintains all of NY 262 east of Byron as the eastern segment of the unsigned County Route 13 (CR 13). Past NY 237, NY 262 becomes Townline Road and heads toward Bergen, traversing farmland and serving a handful of homes as it heads east. Across the town line in Bergen, the route passes directly north of the Byron–Bergen Central School District's three-school campus, located in an otherwise open area off of West Bergen Road.

The route continues on, crossing the CSX Transportation-owned Rochester Subdivision rail line at a sharp angle by way of a grade crossing on its way to the village of Bergen. Like in Elba, NY 262 bypasses most of the village's more developed areas and only skirts the southern edge of the community. It intersects one residential street before terminating at a junction with NY 19, named South Lake Avenue. The center of the village is situated 0.5 miles (0.8 km) to the north on NY 19, which also indirectly connects with the Thruway 3 miles (5 km) to the south in Le Roy.

== History ==
NY 262 was assigned as part of the 1930 renumbering of state highways in New York; however, it initially began at NY 98 in the village of Elba and followed a more northerly alignment along Barrville and North Byron Roads to NY 237 north of the hamlet of Byron. The route was extended on both ends by the following year to NY 19 (now NY 63) in Oakfield and NY 63 (modern NY 19) in Bergen, but was truncated on its eastern end to its junction with NY 98 south of Elba c. 1939. It was reextended to Byron in the early 1950s; however, it now used Ford and Byron–Elba Roads instead in order to serve the hamlet of Byron. NY 262 was extended back to Bergen in the late 1950s.

== Major intersections ==
The entire route is in Genesee County.

Location	mi	km	Destinations	Notes
Village of Oakfield	0.00	0.00	NY 63	Western terminus
Village of Elba	4.24	6.82	NY 98 north	Northern terminus of NY 98 / NY 262 overlap
Town of Elba	4.47	7.19	NY 98 south	Southern terminus of NY 98 / NY 262 overlap
Byron	10.98	17.67	NY 237	Hamlet of Byron
Village of Bergen	17.03	27.41	NY 19	Eastern terminus
1.000 mi = 1.609 km; 1.000 km = 0.621 mi: Concurrency terminus
