= Gifford–Walker Farm =

Historic house in New York, United States

- Gifford-Walker Farm
- U.S. National Register of Historic Places
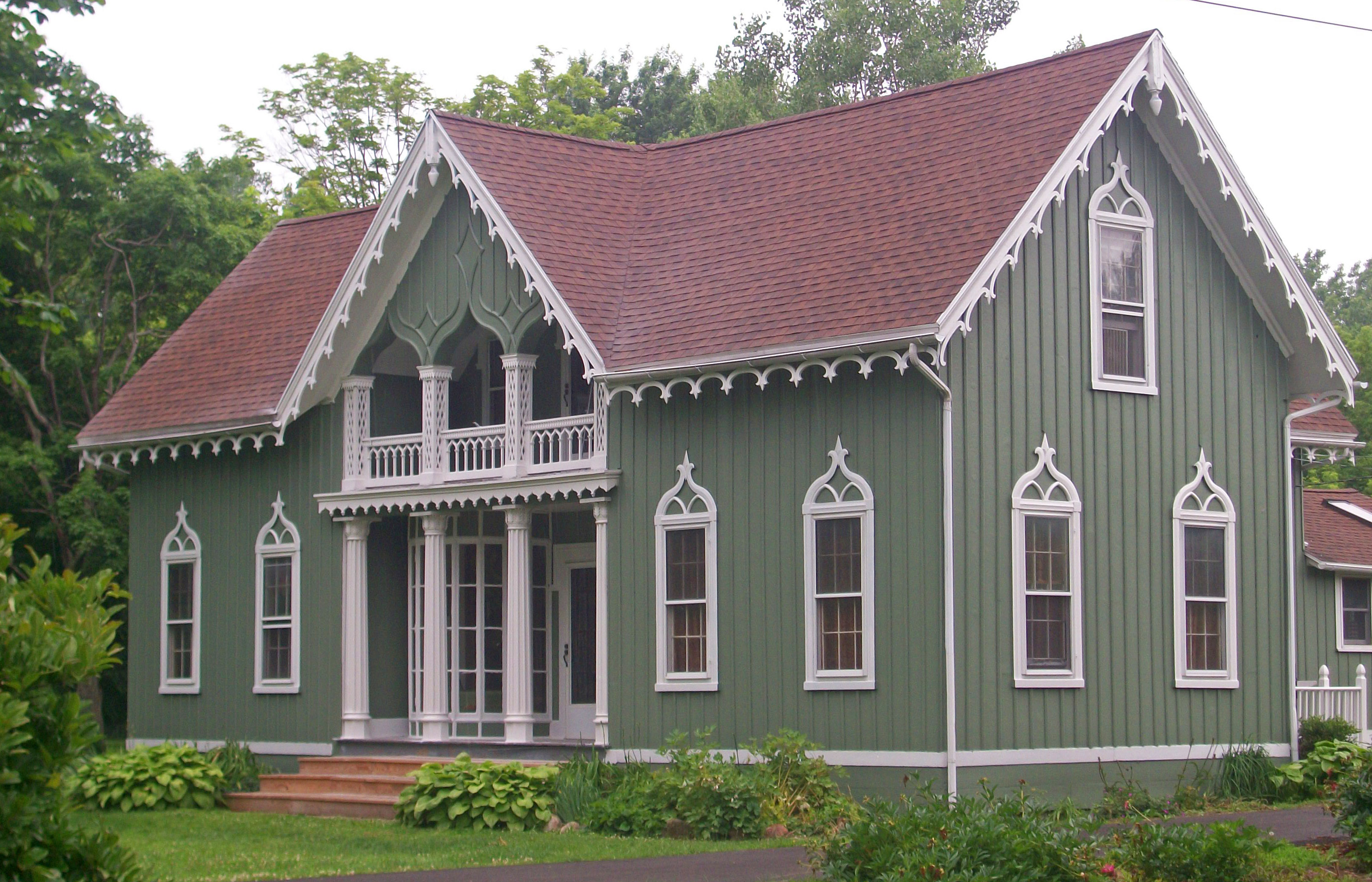
- South elevation and east profile, 2010

- Location within New York Location within the United States
- Location: North Bergen, NY
- Nearest city: Batavia
- Coordinates: 43°7′26″N 78°0′51″W
- Area: 69 acres (28 ha).
- Built: 1870
- Architectural style: Carpenter Gothic
- NRHP reference No.: 80004276
- Added to NRHP: January 10, 1980

The Gifford–Walker Farm, also known as the Alice Walker Farm, is located on North Bergen Road (Genesee County Route 14) in North Bergen, New York, United States. Its farmhouse is a two-story Carpenter Gothic style structure built in 1870.

It has remained largely intact since it was construction, and has only been owned by three families. In 1980 it and an accompanying barn and shed were listed on the National Register of Historic Places, the northernmost property in the county listed.

== Buildings and grounds ==
The farm is located along the north side of North Bergen Road in the small rural hamlet of North Bergen, part of the Town of Bergen. It is just west of Wood Road, a quarter-mile (400 m) south of the Orleans County line, southwest of the tripoint the two counties share with Monroe County. There is a church across the street and some other houses on either side, all with large lots, some of them also cultivated. North of the house the fields stretch 69 acres (28 ha), with the northern 22 acres (8.9 ha) across the county line in the town of Clarendon. The three buildings are all located near North Bergen, at the south end of the property.

The house is a T-shaped frame two-story structure seven bays wide with board-and-batten siding rising to a steeply pitched cross-gabled roof covered in asphalt shingles. On the north (rear) elevation the central section telescopes into three progressively smaller sections. The two smaller units are sided in shingle; an enclosed porch is on the northeast corner of a clapboard-sided wing on the east of the smallest extension.

In the center of the front (south) facade is a recessed porch that serves as the main entrance. On its west side is a bay window with 36 separate panes of glass. The porch is screened by four fluted Corinthian columns. Above them the second story has a Gothic railing with four square latticework piers supporting the three ogee arches that shelter a small recessed balcony. Ogee trim also tops all windows save those in the inside of the porch and balcony, both sided in flushboard. The roofline's overhanging eaves are trimmed with decorative hand-sawn vergeboard.

Inside, the house is laid out with a living room, dining room and kitchen in line from front to back on the first floor of the stem of the T. The east wing has a parlor; the west a family room. Many rooms, particularly the living room, retain their original "grained"] Gothic-style woodwork.

There are two outbuildings. A barn behind the house is painted in red with white trim and has the name "G H Walker" on it. A frame shed to the northwest is similar to the barn but is not in as good condition. The frame shed collapsed and was taken down in 2009.

== History ==
Aaron Gifford, postmaster of North Bergen, built the house around 1870 as the homestead for what was then a hundred-acre (40 ha) farm. The Carpenter Gothic style had been popularized several decades earlier in the pattern books of Andrew Jackson Downing, and these were often used by builders without any architectural training. The house shows many features of the style, such as the decorative vergeboards, steep cross-gabled roofs and vertical siding, the latter of which Downing recommended as more economical and better in tune with natural surroundings.

The bay window west of the main entrance, not a feature found on every Carpenter Gothic home, was also a feature praised by Downing. In The Architecture of Country Houses, he wrote that they gave "an air of dignity even to the smallest dwellings. The linear quality of the home suggests the Federal and Greek Revival styles used for many rural homes earlier in the 19th century, and the unknown builder, familiar with those modes, may have unconsciously been recalling them.

Gifford sold the farm to a Walker family in 1891. They seem to have added the two smaller rear wings and the east wing adjoining them to the house. At the time of the property's listing on the Register, when the Walkers still owned the house, the front porch was blocked by shrubs and the rear porch was instead used as the main entrance. The house was sold by auction in 1986 and purchased by William and Bonnie Perkins of Byron, NY for the purpose of renovation and resale. For four years the entire house was worked on: gutted and modernized without damage to any of the woodwork and character. The front porch steps were restored to the front porch. Their daughter, Jennifer Weaver, began renting the house in 1991 and eventually purchased the house in 2000. In 2018 the house was sold to Matt and Caitlyn Mckenrick. There have been no other changes to the house.

== See also ==
- National Register of Historic Places listings in Genesee County, New York
