= Diver's Lake =

Glacial lake in western New York

Coordinates: 43°2′28″N 78°23′58″W

Divers Lake
- Interactive map of Divers Lake

Divers Lake is a spring-fed glacial lake located in Genesee County, New York, with a size of 6.5 acres. It is also the site of the largest flint quarry in Western New York, where Clovis points have been discovered.

Other names for the lake include Spirit Lake, Hidden Lake, and Devil's Lake.

== History ==
The name Spirit Lake comes from the belief held by the Seneca that a spirit sea serpent, "Sais-Tah-Go-Wa" lived there. According to Seneca mythology, the lake was believed to be inhabited by a "monster underwater serpent with horns. Yearly, the sacrifice of a beautiful maiden and her lover were required. Sorrowfully the relatives turned away, dreading to see the serpent arise to swallow them. Of course the lovers never could come back; and of course they never wanted to be devoured by horned serpents. Who knows where they went?"

Rev. Samuel Kirkland visited the lake on his mission to the Senecas in 1788. According to Kirkland, "The old Indians affirm that formerly a demon in the form of a dragon resided in this lake, which frequently disgorged balls of liquid fire. To appease him many sacrifices of tobacco had been made by the Indians". White Chief or White Feather, an Indian chief, resided at the lake. In 1801, he was hired to lay out our present Route 5 from Bushville to Clarence. Until the 1838 Treaty of Buffalo Creek, where many Seneca were relocated, the lake was part of the Tonawanda Reservation. The land was purchased from James W. Wadsworth in 1878 by Edward Diver, hence the name.
