= Sy Studley =

American baseball player (1841–1901)

- Center fielder
- Born: May 1841; Byron, New York, U.S.
- Died: July 9, 1901 (aged 60); Grand Island, Nebraska, U.S.

MLB debut
- April 20, 1872, for the Washington Nationals

Last MLB appearance
- May 8, 1872, for the Washington Nationals

MLB statistics
- Games played: 5
- Hits: 2
- Batting average: .095
- Stats at Baseball Reference

Teams
- National Association of Base Ball Players: Washington Nationals (1866–1870); National Association of Professional Base Ball Players: Washington Nationals (1872)

Seymour L. "Sy" Studley (May, 1841 – July 9, 1901), nicknamed "Warhorse", also known as "Seem" Studley, was an American professional baseball player who played five games in center field for the 1872 Washington Nationals of the National Association of Professional Base Ball Players. He collected two hits in 21 at bats for a career .095 batting average.

Born in Byron, New York in May 1841, he hailed from Rochester, New York when he joined the Washington Nationals of the NABBP in 1866. He continued to play for the Nationals from 1867 to 1870.

Before his baseball career, Studley served for the 54th New York National Guard for a period of 100 days in 1864 during the American Civil War. He died in Grand Island, Nebraska at the age of 60, and is interred at Soldiers and Sailors Home Cemetery.

== Selected works ==
- Ryczek, William J. 1998. When Johnny Came Sliding Home. McFarland. ISBN 0-7864-0514-7.
