= New York State Route 98 =

Highway in western New York

New York State Route 98
- Map of western New York with NY 98 highlighted in red

Route information
- Maintained by NYSDOT and the city of Batavia
- Length: 97.57 mi (157.02 km)
- Existed: 1930–present

Major junctions
- South end: US 219 in Great Valley
- NY 39 in Arcade; US 20A in Sheldon; US 20 in Alexander; I-90 / New York Thruway in Batavia; NY 31 in Albion
- North end: Lake Ontario State Parkway in Carlton

Location
- Country: United States
- State: New York
- Counties: Cattaraugus, Wyoming, Genesee, Orleans

Highway system
- New York Highways; Interstate; US; State; Reference; Parkways
← NY 97	→ I-99

New York State Route 98 (NY 98) is a state highway in the western part of New York in the United States. The southern terminus of the route is at an intersection with U.S. Route 219 (US 219) in the town of Great Valley in Cattaraugus County. The northern end is at an interchange with the Lake Ontario State Parkway in the town of Carlton in Orleans County, near the southern shore of Lake Ontario. In between, NY 98 serves the city of Batavia, connects to the New York State Thruway (Interstate 90 or I-90), and passes by the Attica Correctional Facility. Most of the route passes through rural, undeveloped areas; however, in southern Genesee County, it traverses more urbanized areas that lie in and around Batavia.

Most of modern NY 98 north of Batavia was originally designated as New York State Route 74 in the mid-1920s. It was extended south to US 20 (now US 20A) in Varysburg in the late 1920s. NY 98, meanwhile, was assigned as part of the 1930 renumbering of state highways in New York, utilizing NY 74 north of Varysburg and its modern alignment south of the hamlet. Initially, it followed what is now US 219 into Salamanca and ended at NY 18 in Carlton. The extension into Salamanca was eliminated in the 1960s, while the route was extended north to meet the Lake Ontario Parkway in the 1970s. Other changes, including a pair of substantial realignments, have also occurred in the time since the route was originally assigned.

== Route description ==
Most of NY 98 is maintained by the New York State Department of Transportation. The only non-state-maintained section of the route lies within the city of Batavia, where the route is locally maintained from the southern city line to the south end of the overlap with NY 33.

=== Great Valley to Arcade ===
NY 98 begins at an intersection with US 219 in Great Valley, a hamlet located northeast of Salamanca in the town of Great Valley. The route heads northeast across Cattaraugus County, paralleling Forks Creek through northeast Great Valley and the northwestern corner of Humphrey to the town of Franklinville. The creek ends southwest of the village of Franklinville; however, NY 98 continues northeast for an additional 3.5 miles (5.6 km) across sparsely populated areas to the hamlet of Cadiz, where it intersects NY 16 just south of Franklinville. Here, NY 98 joins NY 16 northward through the village to the town of Farmersville, where the two routes split.

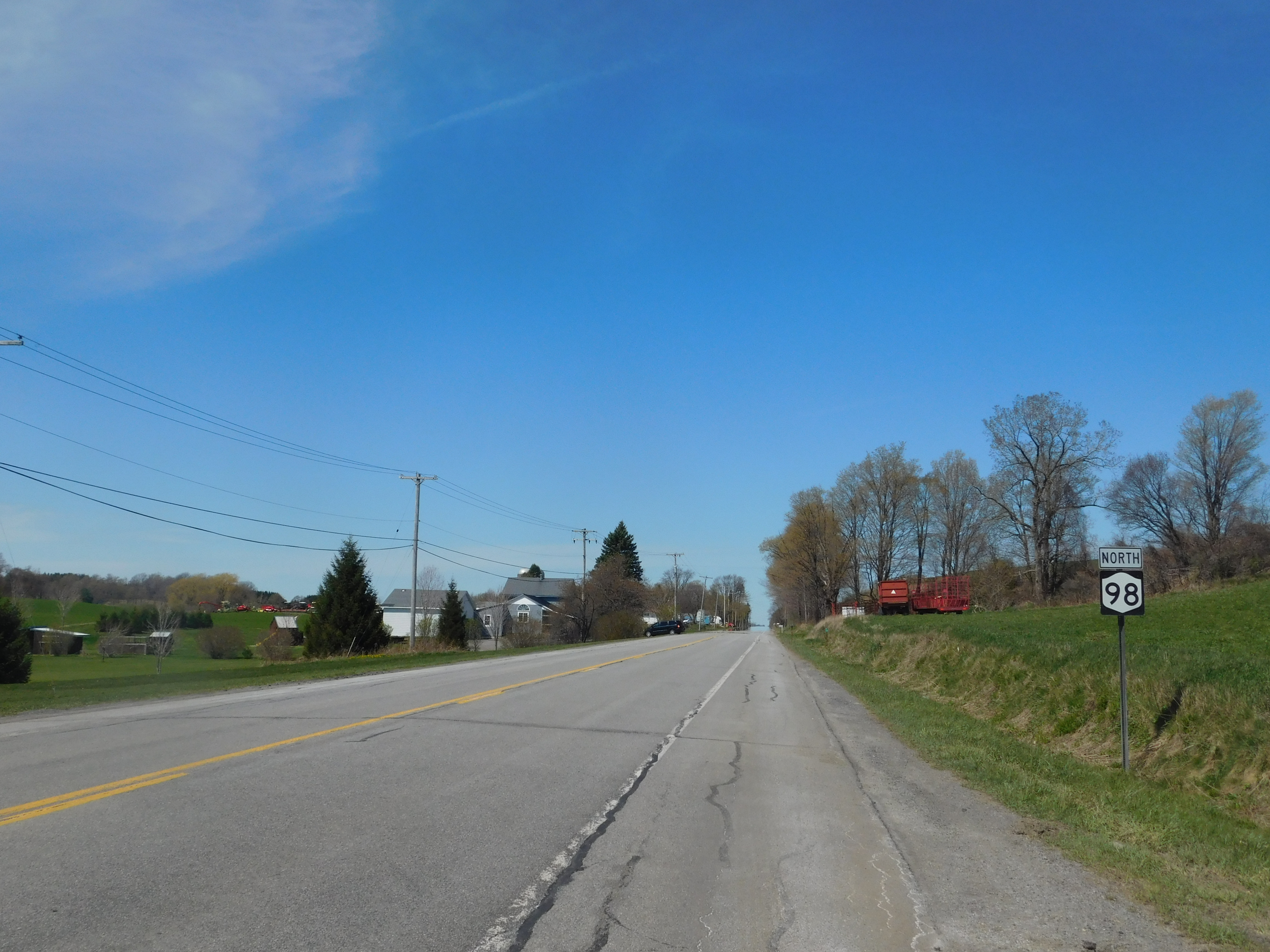
NY 98 north from NY 78 in Waldos Corners

East of NY 16, NY 98 continues generally northeastward across rural terrain through the hamlets of Farmersville and Farmersville Station to an isolated junction east of the latter, where NY 98 intersects NY 243 at a T-intersection. While NY 243 leaves to the right (east), NY 98 turns left, initially heading northwest before curving to the north as it crosses into the town of Freedom. The route initially heads north toward the hamlet of the same name in the northeastern corner of the county, but ultimately bypasses the hamlet to the west to follow Clear Creek into Sandusky, the last settlement on NY 98 within the county. At the hamlet, NY 98 turns back to the northwest and crosses into Wyoming County and the town of Arcade.

Across the county line, the amount of development along the route increases as NY 98 enters the village of Arcade on Liberty Street. In the center of the village, NY 98 turns east to overlap with NY 39 for two long blocks along Main Street. The two routes split at Water Street, with NY 98 following the street northward across Cattaraugus Creek to a junction with North Street in the lightly populated northern portion of the village. At this point, Water Street merges into North Street, and the latter parallels the Arcade and Attica Railroad (ARA) and Cattaraugus Creek as it carries NY 98 northeastward out of the village. NY 98 follows the creek to an area of farmlands known as Arcade Center, where the route and the railroad both turn north toward Java, a mostly rural town dominated by farmland.

=== Java to Attica ===
NY 98 heads virtually due north through Java, remaining in close proximity to the ARA up to the hamlet of Java Center. NY 98 crosses the railroad at a grade crossing just south of the hamlet before meeting NY 77 and NY 78 at a four-way junction in the center of the community. NY 77 continues north from the intersection on Cattaraugus Road while NY 98 joins NY 78 eastward on Main Street, traversing the ARA at another grade crossing on their way out of the hamlet. The overlap extends for 2.5 miles (4.0 km) across farmlands and through forests to a point once known as Five Corners, where NY 98 separates from NY 78 and turns northward once more. The route continues across a mixture of cultivated fields and forests to North Java, a small hamlet located at the junction between NY 98 and Perry and Wethersfield Roads. Not far to the north is the Java–Sheldon town line, where NY 98 curves to follow a slightly northeastward alignment across Sheldon.

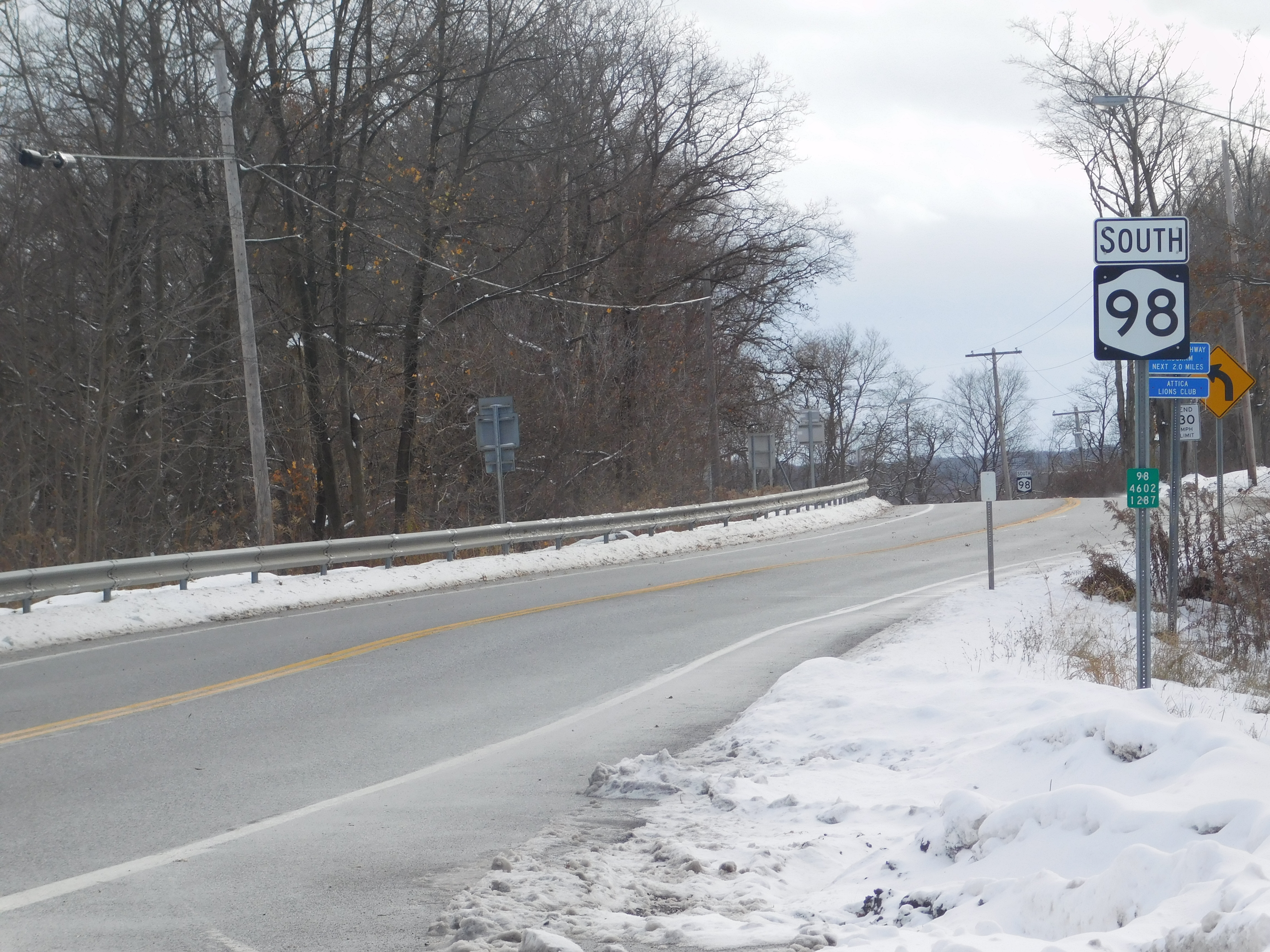
Southbound on NY 98 from NY 354 in Attica

About 1.5 miles (2.4 km) into Sheldon, NY 98 passes the southern end of Tonawanda Creek, the source of which is located along the west side of NY 98. The route follows the water body along the Sheldon–Orangeville town line to a junction with US 20A just inside of the town of Orangeville. NY 98 joins US 20A here, following the latter northwestward to Varysburg, a small creekside hamlet in Sheldon. At the center of Varysburg, NY 98 leaves US 20A to follow Creek Road northward through the towns of Bennington and Attica, following the base of a large valley surrounding Tonawanda Creek. Due to the terrain of the area, the routing of NY 98 is fairly isolated from the remainder of the county until it reaches the outskirts of the village of Attica.

South of the village, the route comes within view of the Attica Correctional Facility, the site of the 1971 Attica Prison riot. The route enters the village shortly afterward, following High Street through the lightly developed southern half of Attica. The amount of development begins to increase at a junction with NY 354, known here as the Attica–Bennington Highway. One block later, NY 98 passes under the Norfolk Southern Railway's Southern Tier Line and joins NY 238 at Main Street. The junction of Main and High Streets marks the start of Attica's business district, which follows NY 98 and NY 238 north for two blocks along Market Street to Buffalo Street. Here, NY 238 leaves NY 98 to continue toward Darien while NY 98 remains on Market Street to the northern village and town lines, which also serves as the Wyoming–Genesee county line, though a small northernmost portion of the village of Attica, which NY 98 returns slightly, is in the town of Alexander.

=== Batavia area ===
Across the county line in the town of Alexander, NY 98 passes through lightly but consistently populated areas that serve as the suburbs of Batavia. As Alexander Road, the route meets US 20 at an interchange in the village of Alexander. The Alexander Road name remains through Alexander, past the CSX Transportation-owned Rochester Subdivision in the town of Batavia (which NY 98 passes under), and up to the Batavia city limits, leaving the town of the same name, where it becomes Walnut Street. Within the city, NY 98 continues to run through mostly residential areas as it crosses the Depew, Lancaster and Western Railroad at-grade. On the southern fringe of downtown Batavia, Walnut Street turns westward and becomes South Main Street, avoiding the nearby Tonawanda Creek. NY 98 meets NY 33 one block later, and the two routes join on Oak Street for one block to cross over Tonawanda Creek and enter the city's commercial district.

On the opposite bank, NY 33 separates from NY 98 at an intersection with West Main Street (NY 5 and NY 63), one of Batavia's main commercial strips. While NY 33 heads southeast toward downtown Batavia, NY 98 continues north on Oak Street through a residential part of the city to the northern city limits, coming back to the town of Batavia, where it connects to the New York State Thruway (I-90) via an interchange south of the Genesee County Airport. At this point, NY 98 becomes Oak Orchard Road and heads through progressively less developed areas to the village of Elba, located in an area of the town of Elba dominated by open farmland. NY 98 overlaps NY 262 through the southern fringe of the village before continuing through Elba as Main Street. Just north of the village limits, Oak Orchard Road leaves NY 98 to follow a more easterly routing into Orleans County.

=== Orleans County ===
NY 98, meanwhile, proceeds toward the county line on Quaker Hill Road, which forms the first portion of the linear north–south alignment that the remainder of NY 98 takes to its northern terminus near Lake Ontario. About 0.5 miles (0.8 km) south of Orleans County, NY 98 passes through a marshy area and crosses over Oak Orchard Creek, here contained within a canal that takes the stream through the nearby swamps. The marshes follow NY 98 into Orleans County and the town of Barre, where the route meets County Route 99 (CR 99) at a junction 3 miles (5 km) north of the county line. Until the early 1950s, CR 99 (West Barre Road) was part of NY 279, which overlapped NY 98 between this point and its current southern terminus in the town of Gaines. Past CR 99, Oak Orchard Road returns from its eastern sojourn and carries NY 98 as it heads across firmer areas through Barre Center and crosses into the town of Albion.

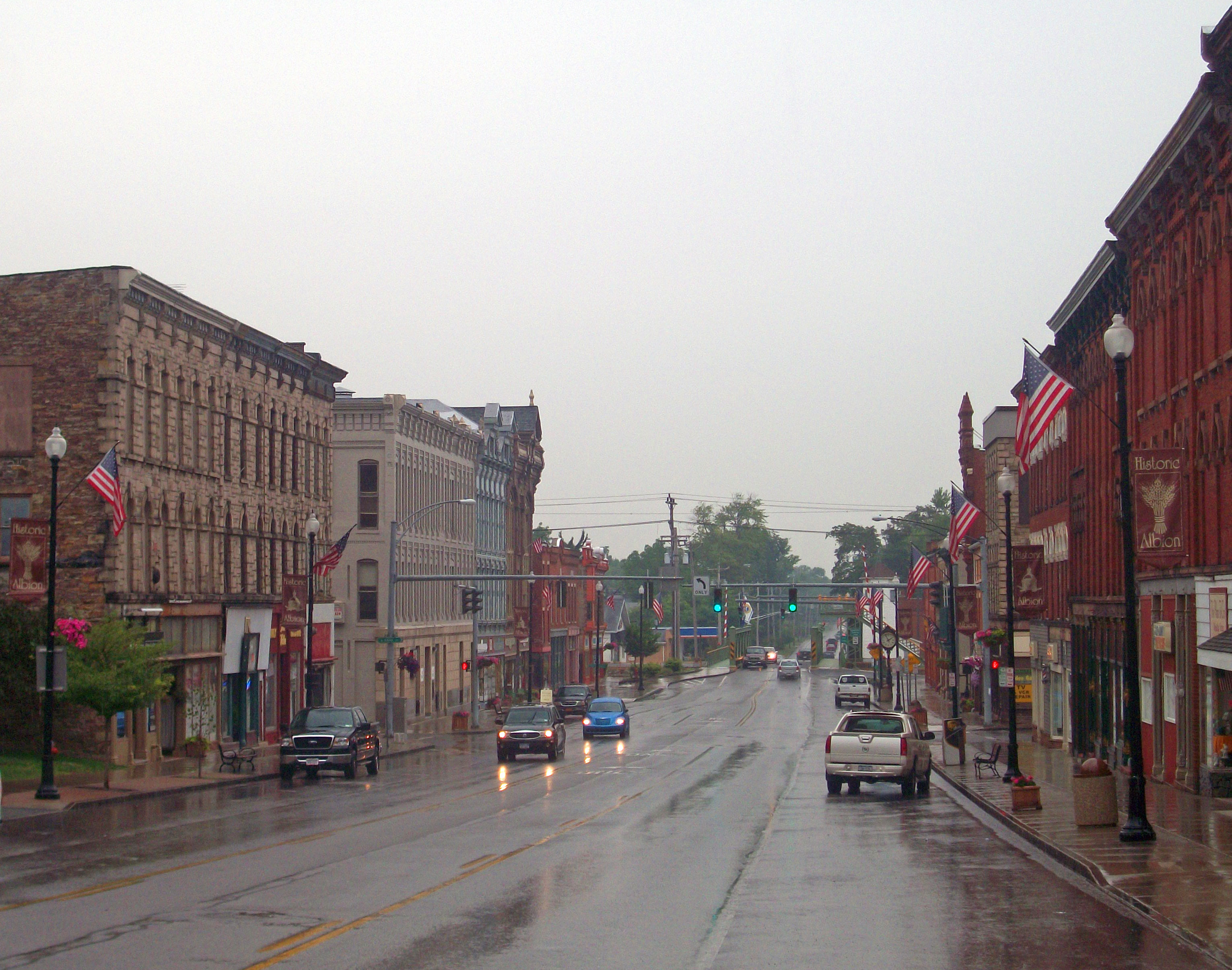
NY 98 through downtown Albion

Just north of the Barre–Albion town line, NY 98 intersects NY 31A, a southerly alternate route of NY 31 across Orleans and Monroe counties. NY 98 continues on for 2 miles (3.2 km) to the village of Albion, where it becomes Main Street and intersects NY 31 itself. Past NY 31, NY 98 passes the county courthouse before going through the village's downtown district and crossing over the Erie Canal. On the other side of the canal, the route enters the town of Gaines before exiting the Albion village limits. At Five Corners, a small hamlet north of Albion, NY 98 intersects the current southern terminus of NY 279. From this point north, NY 98 traverses far less developed areas, save for a handful of hamlets. One of these is Childs, where NY 98 meets NY 104 (Ridge Road), just west of the Cobblestone Historic District, a National Historic Landmark.

North of Childs lies the town of Carlton, the final town that NY 98 traverses. The route proceeds through the hamlet of Carlton to an area known as Baldwin Corner, where NY 18 enters from the east and merges with NY 98. NY 18 and NY 98 remain concurrent to a hamlet known as The Bridges, where NY 18 turns west and crosses over Oak Orchard Creek, which enters The Bridges from the southwest. NY 98, meanwhile, crosses over a small tributary known as Marsh Creek and meets Oak Orchard River Road on the northern bank. From here, NY 98 continues northward along the eastern edge of Oak Orchard Creek as Point Breeze Road to an interchange with the Lake Ontario State Parkway, where NY 98 terminates just 0.5 miles (0.8 km) south of Lake Ontario.

== History ==
The segment of modern NY 98 between Varysburg and Batavia was originally designated as part of Route 19, an unsigned legislative route, by the New York State Legislature in 1908. In the mid-1920s, what is now NY 98 between Batavia and modern NY 18 in Carlton was designated as NY 74. The route was extended southward to Varysburg over the former routing of legislative Route 19 in the late 1920s. In the 1930 renumbering of state highways in New York, NY 74 became part of NY 98, a new route that extended from Salamanca in the south to Carlton in the north via Great Valley, Franklinville, Arcade, and Varysburg. When US 219 was extended into New York c. 1935, it was routed on NY 98 between Salamanca and Great Valley. The overlap between US 219 and NY 98 remained intact until c. 1962 when NY 98 was truncated on its southern end to Great Valley.

Originally, NY 98 followed a more easterly alignment through the towns of Elba and Barre. At the northern edge of the village of Elba, NY 98 left its modern alignment and followed modern CR 24 in Genesee County and CR 98 in Orleans County before rejoining its current alignment near Barre Center. The route was realigned to follow a linear path between the two communities in July 1952. Farther south, NY 98 was originally routed on East Arcade Road (now Wyoming County's CR 11) between Arcade and North Java. NY 98 was realigned c. 1933 to follow Curriers, Chaffee, and Cattaraugus Roads between Arcade and Java Center and overlap with NY 78 between Java Center and its original alignment to the east. The portion of the route between Arcade and Java Center was also designated as part of NY 77. NY 98 was relocated back onto its original alignment via East Arcade Road c. 1939 while NY 77 was truncated north to Corfu. NY 77 was reextended to the vicinity of Arcade c. 1961, following the modern routing of NY 98 between Arcade and Java Center. NY 98 was realigned in the early 1960s to follow NY 77 between Arcade and Java Center, resulting in the truncation of NY 77 to Java Center.

When the Lake Ontario State Parkway was constructed in the 1970s, NY 98 was extended north along NY 18 and Point Breeze Road to meet the parkway at a new interchange near the Carlton hamlet of The Bridges. Although the short extension of the route was signed as a state highway, ownership and maintenance of it was not transferred from Orleans County to the state of New York until April 1, 1989. The segment of Point Breeze Road from the parkway to the Lake Ontario shoreline remains county maintained as CR 37.

== Major intersections ==
County	Location	mi	km	Destinations	Notes
Cattaraugus	Great Valley	0.00	0.00	US 219 – Salamanca, Ellicottville, Buffalo	Southern terminus
Cattaraugus	Town of Franklinville	12.38	19.92	NY 16 south	Southern terminus of NY 16 / NY 98 overlap; hamlet of Cadiz
Cattaraugus	Farmersville	15.54	25.01	NY 16 north – Delevan	Northern terminus of NY 16 / NY 98 overlap
Cattaraugus	Freedom	25.00	40.23	NY 243 east – Rushford	Western terminus of NY 243
Wyoming	Village of Arcade	34.01	54.73	NY 39 west	Western terminus of NY 39 / NY 98 overlap
Wyoming	Village of Arcade	34.14	54.94	NY 39 east – Bliss, Pike	Eastern terminus of NY 39 / NY 98 overlap
Wyoming	Java	42.92	69.07	NY 77 north – Bennington Center NY 78 north	Hamlet of Java Center; western terminus of NY 78 / NY 98 overlap; southern terminus of NY 77
Wyoming	Java	45.47	73.18	NY 78 south – Pike	Eastern terminus of NY 78 / NY 98 overlap
Wyoming	Orangeville	53.18	85.58	US 20A east – Warsaw	Southern terminus of US 20A / NY 98 overlap
Wyoming	Sheldon	53.79	86.57	US 20A west – East Aurora	Hamlet of Varysburg; northern terminus of US 20A / NY 98 overlap
Wyoming	Village of Attica	61.27	98.60	NY 354 west – Bennington	Eastern terminus of NY 354
Wyoming	Village of Attica	61.39	98.80	NY 238 south	Southern terminus of NY 98 / NY 238 overlap
Wyoming	Village of Attica	61.69	99.28	NY 238 north	Northern terminus of NY 98 / NY 238 overlap
Genesee	Village of Alexander	64.91	104.46	US 20 – Buffalo, Avon	
Genesee	City of Batavia	72.34	116.42	NY 33 west	Southern terminus of NY 33 / NY 98 overlap
Genesee	City of Batavia	72.42	116.55	NY 5 east / NY 63 / NY 33	Northern terminus of NY 33 / NY 98 overlap
Genesee	City of Batavia	73.53	118.34	I-90 / New York Thruway – Buffalo, Albany	Exit 48 on I-90 / Thruway
Genesee	Town of Elba	77.05	124.00	NY 262 east	Southern terminus of NY 98 / NY 262 overlap
Genesee	Village of Elba	77.28	124.37	NY 262 west	Northern terminus of NY 98 / NY 262 overlap
Orleans	Town of Albion	87.15	140.25	NY 31A – Medina, Clarendon	
Orleans	Village of Albion	89.08	143.36	NY 31	
Orleans	Gaines	90.57	145.76	NY 279 north	Southern terminus of NY 279
Orleans	Gaines	92.22	148.41	NY 104 – Rochester, Niagara Falls	Hamlet of Childs
Orleans	Carlton	95.80	154.18	To NY 18 east	Access via NY 941M; hamlet of Baldwin Corner
Orleans	Carlton	96.00	154.50	NY 18 east	Hamlet of Baldwin Corner; southern terminus of NY 18 / NY 98 overlap
Orleans	Carlton	96.54	155.37	NY 18 west – Lakeside Beach State Park	Hamlet of The Bridges; northern terminus of NY 18 / NY 98 overlap
Orleans	Carlton	97.57	157.02	Lake Ontario State Parkway – Hamlin Beach, Rochester, Lakeside Beach State Park	Interchange; northern terminus
1.000 mi = 1.609 km; 1.000 km = 0.621 mi: Concurrency terminus; Electronic toll collection

== See also ==
- List of county routes in Genesee County, New York (21–30)
- List of county routes in Orleans County, New York
- List of county routes in Wyoming County, New York
