= Bergen (village), New York =

Bergen, New York
- Village
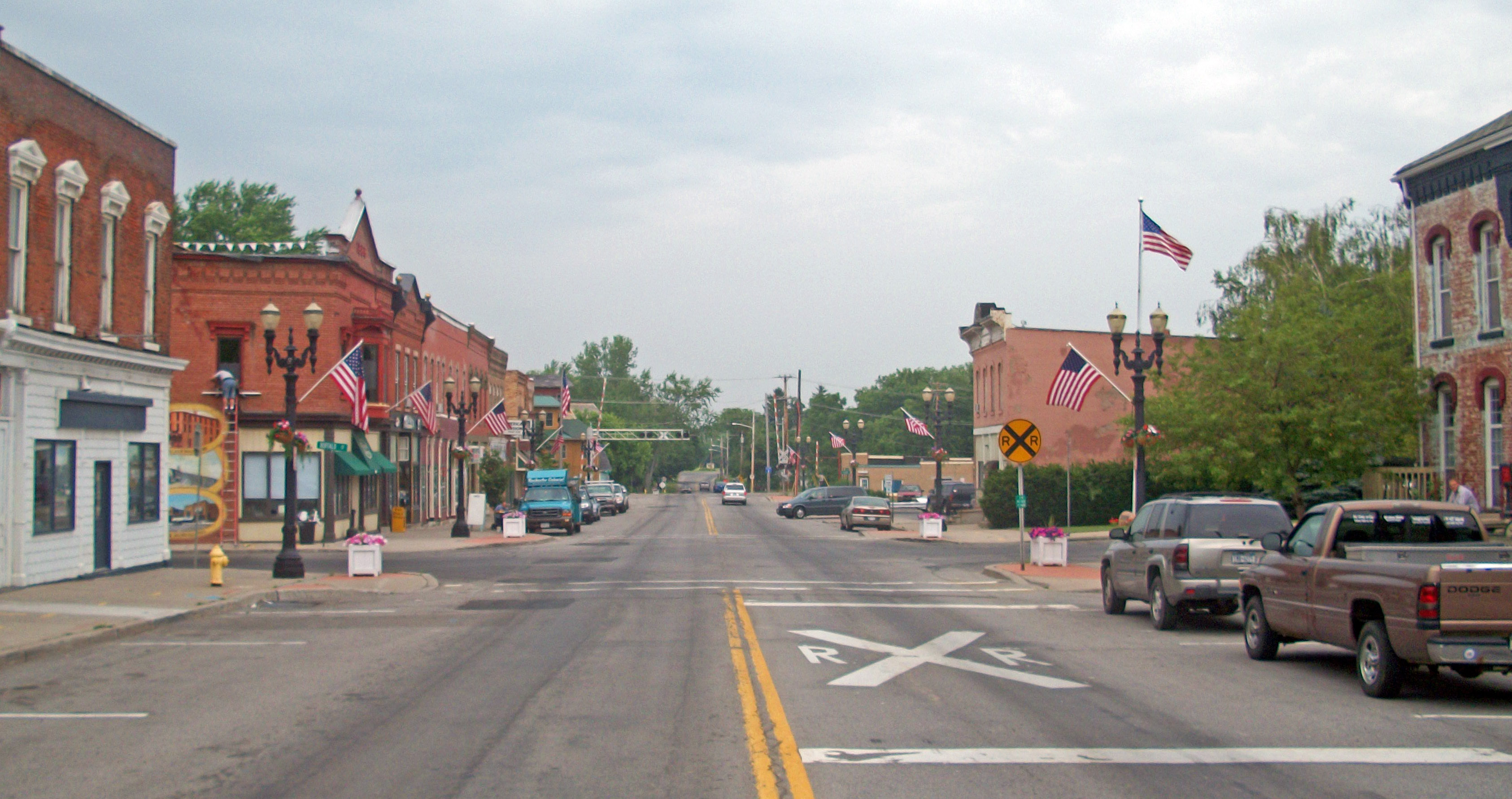
- Looking north along Lake Street (NY 19) to railroad crossing

- Location in Genesee County and the state of New York.

- Location of New York in the United States
- Coordinates: 43°5′0″N 77°56′30″W
- Country: United States
- State: New York
- County: Genesee
- Settled: 1801
- Incorporated: 1877
- Named for: Bergen, Norway

Government
  - Type: Village Hall
  - Mayor: Joseph Chimino

Area
  - Total: 0.74 sq mi (1.91 km^{2})
  - Land: 0.74 sq mi (1.91 km^{2})
  - Water: 0 sq mi (0.00 km^{2})
- Elevation: 606 ft (185 m)
- Highest elevation (In S corner of village): 665 ft (203 m)

Population (2020)
  - Total: 1,208
  - Density: 1,640.0/sq mi (633.21/km^{2})
- Time zone: UTC-5 (EST)
  - Summer (DST): UTC-4 (EDT)
- ZIP Code: 14416
- Area code: 585
- FIPS code: 36-06046
- GNIS feature ID: 0943720
- Website: www.villageofbergen.com

Bergen (/ˈbɜːrdʒən/ BUR-jən) is a village in Genesee County, New York, United States. The population was 1,208 at the 2020 census.

The village lies on the eastern edge of the town of Bergen. The village is north of the junction of Routes 19 and 33.

== History ==
See also Bergen, New York.

The Bergen area was opened up in 1801 when a road was hacked through the thick "Northwoods" from LeRoy to Lake Ontario. (In its early days of settlement, Bergen was called "Northwoods".) Bergen was first settled in 1801 by Samuel Lincoln. In the same year George Letson, William Letson, Benajah Worden, Richard Abbey, Solomon Levi, Jesse Leach, James Letson, Gideon Elliott, and David Scott settled in town.

A colony of 60 families from Connecticut settled the area along Route 19 from Fort Hill (near Parmalee Road) to Black Creek from 1805 to 1810. The first store was a mile south of Route 33 on Route 19 on the east side of the road. The first group of stores was located from the intersection of Lake Road (Route 19) and Route 262 to the intersection of Route 19 and the Scottsville Road (Route 33A). This area was called "Buell's Corner", later "Bergen Corners" or "High Bergen". The first church organization was established in December 1807. The Congregational church was founded January 25, 1808. Harry Kelsey, a graduate of Yale College, taught the first school. The first frame house in the town was erected by Levi Ward, a pioneer physician. Jared Merritt built the first sawmill. Dr. Ward was proprietor of the first store, in 1808. The first inn was opened in 1809 by Samuel Butler. Colonel W.H. Ward was the first postmaster.

After the railroad came through in 1836, an area was laid out around the intersection of Lake Road (Route 19) and the railroad for businesses and houses. It was called "Wardville" after the Levi Ward family who laid it out. It was also called "Cork", after the Irish who settled there while and after the building of the railroad, and "Lower Bergen". The two areas were soon connected by residences and churches.

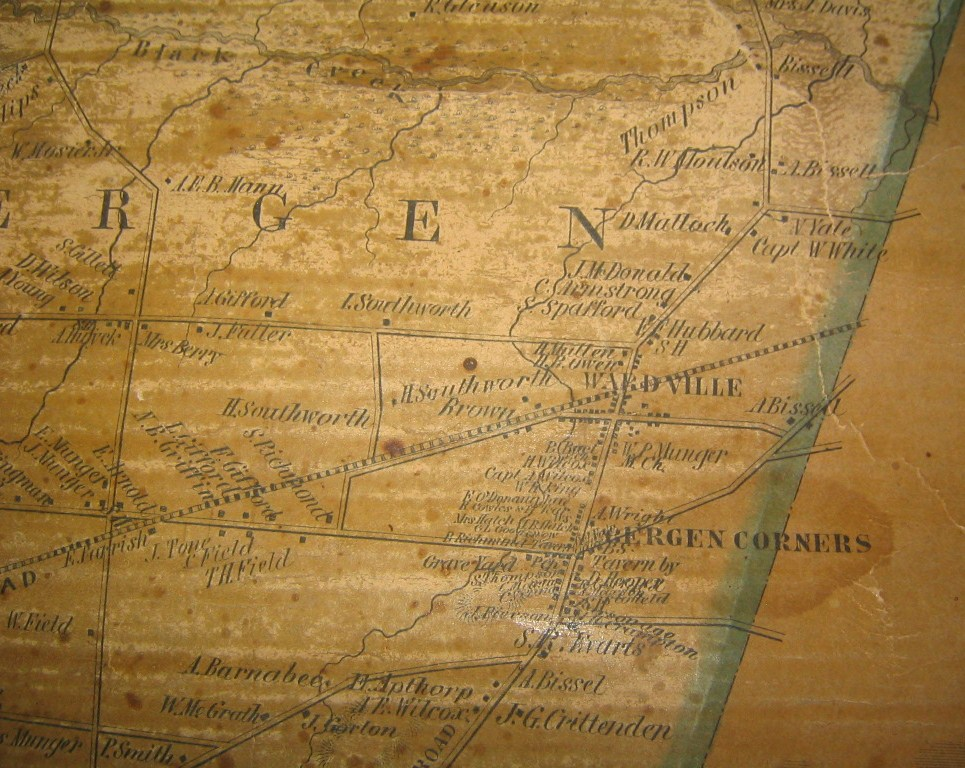
Wardville and Bergen Corners in 1854

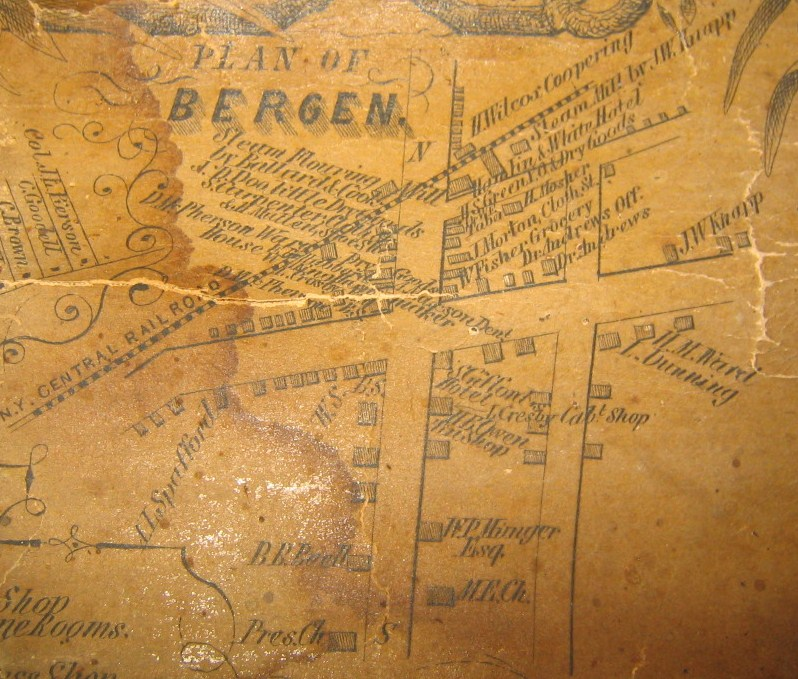
Downtown Bergen in 1854

Fire initially destroyed the business area around the railroad tracks in 1866.

This area, along with the surrounding residences, was incorporated in on March 5, 1877, as the Village of Bergen. The village is near the center of the eastern boundary line, on the New York Central and Hudson River Railroad.

Fire destroyed the business area around the railroad tracks again in 1880. The Village Board passed an ordinance requiring that all structures in this area should be built of brick, stone, or wrought iron.

The west side of the district south of the railroad is on the National Register as the Lake Street Historic District due to its 1880 wrought-iron storefronts, transom windows and probably, also, because of the famous family who founded "Wardville". Some of the family went on from Bergen to the Rochester area and were primary developers of that area.

Due to better building material and firefighting equipment, another fire in 1906 destroyed only some of the buildings on the west side of the street. A fire in 1932 leveled some of the buildings on the east side of the street. Since then, fires in individual buildings have caused some alteration of their facades.

== Geography ==
The village of Bergen is located in northeastern Genesee County at 43°05′00″N 77°56′30″W (43.083388, -77.941754), on the eastern side of the town of Bergen. New York State Route 19 passes through the village center as Lake Avenue, leading north 9 miles (14 km) to Brockport and south 8 miles (13 km) to Le Roy. New York State Route 33 passes along the southern and eastern edges of the village, leading northeast 3 miles (5 km) to Churchville and 19 miles (31 km) to Rochester. To the southwest NY 33 leads 14 miles (23 km) to Batavia. New York State Route 262 leads west 13 miles (21 km) to Elba. Interstate 490 passes just southeast of Bergen village, with access from exit 2 (NY Route 33A); I-490 leads northeast into Rochester and southwest 3.5 miles (5.6 km) to Interstate 90, the New York State Thruway.

According to the United States Census Bureau, the village has a total area of 0.74 square miles (1.91 km^{2}), all land. The village area drains north to Black Creek, an eastward-flowing tributary of the Genesee River.

== Demographics ==
Historical population
Census	Pop.	Note	%±
1850	250		—
1860	150		−40.0%
1880	675		—
1890	623		−7.7%
1900	624		0.2%
1910	637		2.1%
1920	576		−9.6%
1930	724		25.7%
1940	658		−9.1%
1950	786		19.5%
1960	964		22.6%
1970	1,018		5.6%
1980	976		−4.1%
1990	1,103		13.0%
2000	1,240		12.4%
2010	1,176		−5.2%
2020	1,208		2.7%
U.S. Decennial Census

As of the census of 2000, there were 1,240 people, 466 households, and 317 families residing in the village. The population density was 2,002.3 inhabitants per square mile (773.1/km^{2}). There were 477 housing units at an average density of 770.2 per square mile (297.4/km^{2}). The racial makeup of the village was 95.32% White, 0.56% Black or African American, 0.40% Native American, 0.81% Asian, 0.97% from other races, and 1.94% from two or more races. Hispanic or Latino of any race were 1.45% of the population.

There were 466 households, out of which 35.2% had children under the age of 18 living with them, 57.5% were married couples living together, 6.4% had a female householder with no husband present, and 31.8% were non-families. 24.2% of all households were made up of individuals, and 8.2% had someone living alone who was 65 years of age or older. The average household size was 2.66 and the average family size was 3.23.

In the village, the population was spread out, with 28.8% under the age of 18, 7.9% from 18 to 24, 32.8% from 25 to 44, 21.2% from 45 to 64, and 9.3% who were 65 years of age or older. The median age was 35 years. For every 100 females, there were 103.9 males. For every 100 females age 18 and over, there were 102.1 males.

The median income for a household in the village was $51,016, and the median income for a family was $54,327. Males had a median income of $35,909 versus $26,364 for females. The per capita income for the village was $19,689. About 2.2% of families and 3.6% of the population were below the poverty line, including 4.8% of those under age 18 and 7.1% of those age 65 or over.

== See also ==
- Bergen, New York
