= North Bergen, New York =

Hamlet in New York, United States

Coordinates: 43°07′25″N 78°00′48″W

North Bergen is a hamlet in the town of Bergen in Genesee County, New York, United States.
