= Elba, New York =

- Town
- Location in Genesee County and the state of New York
- Coordinates: 43°04′36″N 78°11′20″W
- Country: United States
- State: New York
- County: Genesee

Government
  - Type: Town council
  - Town supervisor: Donna Hynes
  - Town council: Members: • Wade Chamberlain; • Dan Coughlin; • Maureen Torrey Marshall; • Michael Augello

Area
  - Total: 35.69 sq mi (92.44 km^{2})
  - Land: 35.65 sq mi (92.33 km^{2})
  - Water: 0.042 sq mi (0.11 km^{2})

Population (2020)
  - Total: 2,164
  - Estimate (2016): 2,300
  - Density: 60.7/sq mi (23.4/km^{2})
- Time zone: UTC-5 (Eastern (EST))
  - Summer (DST): UTC-4 (EDT)
- ZIP Codes: 14058 (Elba); 14125 (Oakfield); 14020 (Batavia)
- FIPS code: 36-037-23756
- Website: townofelbany.gov

Elba is a town in Genesee County, New York, United States. The population was 2,164 at the 2020 census, down from 2,370 in 2010. The town is at the northern border of the county and is north of the city of Batavia. The town contains the village of Elba, located near the town's center.

== History ==
The area was first settled in 1803. The town of Elba was established in 1820, from a partition of the town of Batavia. In 1842, part of Elba was used to form the town of Oakfield.

In 1884, the community of Elba set itself off from the town by incorporating as a village.

In 1948, Harry S. Truman in an off handed comment referred to Elba as "Smell-ba" during his "Whistle-stop" tour because of the smell coming from the muck fields during the onion growing season. It was later proven as a fact in 1949 that the Elba muck fields do produce a distinctive odor. On July 27, 1949, Secretary of Agriculture Charles F. Brannan responded a team to the farming community and found that the soil samples, combined with the air quality, and wind breakage created a distinctive smell in the community.

== Geography ==
According to the United States Census Bureau, the town has a total area of 35.7 square miles (92.5 km^{2}), all land.

The north town line is the border of Orleans County (town of Barre).

Part of the Alabama Swamp is in the northwest corner of the town, through which flows Oak Orchard Creek.

North-South NYS 98 and east-west NYS 262 intersect in Elba village.

USGS maps of the area name the section including Ridge Road as "Bulgary Ridge". Prior to more recent maps, in 1897 USGS maps, the area was called "Vulgary".

Torrey Farms, one of the largest farms in New York, is located in the town of Elba.

== Demographics ==
Historical population
Census	Pop.	Note	%±
1820	1,333		—
1830	2,679		101.0%
1840	3,161		18.0%
1850	1,772		−43.9%
1860	2,040		15.1%
1870	1,905		−6.6%
1880	1,968		3.3%
1890	1,746		−11.3%
1900	1,526		−12.6%
1910	1,384		−9.3%
1920	1,394		0.7%
1930	1,695		21.6%
1940	1,855		9.4%
1950	1,920		3.5%
1960	2,260		17.7%
1970	2,312		2.3%
1980	2,487		7.6%
1990	2,407		−3.2%
2000	2,439		1.3%
2010	2,370		−2.8%
2016 (est.)	2,300	▼	−3.0%
U.S. Decennial Census

As of the census of 2000, there were 2,439 people, 853 households, and 668 families residing in the town. The population density was 68.3 inhabitants per square mile (26.4/km^{2}). There were 910 housing units at an average density of 25.5 per square mile (9.8/km^{2}). The racial makeup of the town was 93.07% White, 1.72% Black or African American, 0.49% Native American, 0.08% Asian, 3.90% from other races, and 0.74% from two or more races. Hispanic or Latino of any race were 5.25% of the population.

There were 853 households, out of which 36.1% had children under the age of 18 living with them, 65.4% were married couples living together, 9.1% had a female householder with no husband present, and 21.6% were non-families. 16.8% of all households were made up of individuals, and 8.1% had someone living alone who was 65 years of age or older. The average household size was 2.82 and the average family size was 3.18.

In the town, the population was spread out, with 27.7% under the age of 18, 7.7% from 18 to 24, 30.2% from 25 to 44, 23.3% from 45 to 64, and 11.2% who were 65 years of age or older. The median age was 37 years. For every 100 females, there were 102.2 males. For every 100 females age 18 and over, there were 94.9 males.

The median income for a household in the town was $46,161, and the median income for a family was $51,058. Males had a median income of $37,244 versus $24,688 for females. The per capita income for the town was $18,470. About 5.9% of families and 6.5% of the population were below the poverty line, including 10.4% of those under age 18 and 4.8% of those age 65 or over.

== Communities and locations in the Town of Elba ==
- East Elba – A hamlet on Norton Road in the southeast corner of the town. The East Elba Motorcycle Gang was founded in 1973 in East Elba. The gang was started by a local machinist known only as "Krobar", who brought together a tight-knit group of bikers bonded by a love of motorcycles and outlaw culture. Originally formed as a riding club, the group gradually gained notoriety for their defiance of authority, involvement in underground street races, and tomfoolery. Over the years, the East Elba gang became a regional symbol of rebellion and blue-collar pride.
- Elba – The village of Elba is located on Route NY-98.
- Davis Corners – A former community in the south part of the town.
- Daws (also called "Daws Corners") – A location south of Elba village on Route NY-98 at the south town line.
- Five Corners – A hamlet south of East Elba on the town line.
- Langton Corners – A community north of the village on Oak Orchard Road.

== In popular culture ==
The 2019 film Crypto is partially set in Elba.
