= Oakfield, New York =

Oakfield, New York Oak Orchard
- Town
- Location in Genesee County and the state of New York.
- Coordinates: 43°04′00″N 078°16′13″W
- Country: United States
- State: New York
- County: Genesee

Government
  - Type: Town Council
  - Town Supervisor: Carol Glor
  - Town Council: Members' List: • Michael T. Cianfrini; • Timothy Kabel; • James P. Veazey; • Carol Glor

Area
  - Total: 23.93 sq mi (61.99 km^{2})
  - Land: 23.31 sq mi (60.37 km^{2})
  - Water: 0.63 sq mi (1.62 km^{2})

Population (2010)
  - Total: 3,250
  - Estimate (2016): 3,134
  - Density: 134.4/sq mi (51.91/km^{2})
- Time zone: UTC-5 (Eastern (EST))
  - Summer (DST): UTC-4 (EDT)
- ZIP Code: 14125
- FIPS code: 36-037-54166
- Website: townofoakfieldny.gov

Oakfield is a town in Genesee County, New York, United States. The population was 3,250 at the 2010 census. The name of the town is derived from a number of trees, including the oak. The town is on the northern border of Genesee County. Within the town is a village also named Oakfield.

== History ==
Prehistoric earthworks indicate a previous occupation by Native Americans. The local tribe during historic time were the Seneca people. The manner in which they cut down the trees on their land gave rise to the phrase "Oak Orchard," which has current usage in the area.

The area was once known as "Plain Brook", after it was first settled around 1801. The town was formed in 1842 from the town of Elba and named "Oakfield".

In 1858, the community of Caryville set itself off from the town by incorporating as the village of Oakfield.

== Geography ==
According to the United States Census Bureau, the town has a total area of 23.9 square miles (62.0 km^{2}), of which 23.5 square miles (60.7 km^{2}) is land and 0.5 square miles (1.2 km^{2}, or 1.96%) is water.

Oak Orchard Creek flows across the north part of the town.

The north town line is the border of Orleans County (town of Barre).

== Demographics ==
Historical population
Census	Pop.	Note	%±
1850	1,457		—
1860	1,595		9.5%
1870	1,471		−7.8%
1880	1,495		1.6%
1890	1,441		−3.6%
1900	1,589		10.3%
1910	2,115		33.1%
1920	2,438		15.3%
1930	3,115		27.8%
1940	2,896		−7.0%
1950	3,041		5.0%
1960	3,388		11.4%
1970	3,364		−0.7%
1980	3,213		−4.5%
1990	3,312		3.1%
2000	3,203		−3.3%
2010	3,250		1.5%
2016 (est.)	3,134	▼	−3.6%
U.S. Decennial Census

As of the census of 2010, there were 3,782 people, 1,390 households, and 1007 families residing in the town. The population density was 136.6 inhabitants per square mile (52.7/km^{2}). There were 1,250 housing units at an average density of 53.3 per square mile (20.6/km^{2}). The racial makeup of the town was 95% White, 1.4% Black or African American, 0.6% Native American, 0.2% Asian, 1.1% from other races, and 1.7% from two or more races. Hispanic or Latino of any race were 3.2% of the population.

There were 1,390 households, out of which 31.2% had children under the age of 18 living with them, 56.6% were married couples living together, 10.5% had a female householder with no husband present, and 27.6% were non-families. 22% of all households were made up of individuals, and 10.2% had someone living alone who was 65 years of age or older. The average household size was 2.70 and the average family size was 3.14.

In the town, the population was spread out, with 27.8% under the age of 19, 6.1% from 20 to 24, 25.2% from 25 to 44, 28% from 45 to 64, and 12.9% who were 65 years of age or older. The median age was 38.7 years. For every 100 females, there were 95.6 males.

The median income for a household in the town was $49,023. Males had a median income of $32,355 versus $23,403 for females. The per capita income for the town was $22,174. About 9.1% of the population were below the poverty line.

== Communities and locations in the Town of Oakfield ==
- Dunhams Grove – A former location in the town, where Lewiston Road crosses Oakfield-Batavia Townline Road.
- East Oakfield – A hamlet on the Lockport Road east of the village of Oakfield.
- Five Corners (previously "Oakfield Corners") – A location northwest of the village of Oakfield.
- Oak Orchard Wildlife Management Area – A conservation area in the north part of the town.
- Oakfield (named at first "Plain Brook," then "Caryville" until 1858) – The village of Oakfield, located on NY-63.
