= Byron, New York =

- Town
- Location in Genesee County and the state of New York
- Coordinates: 43°4′50″N 78°3′55″W
- Country: United States
- State: New York
- County: Genesee

Government
  - Type: Town council
  - Town supervisor: Pete Yasses
  - Town council: Members' List: • Jack Redick; • John M. Ivison; • Jeanne A. Freeman; • Jeffrey Thompson

Area
  - Total: 32.29 sq mi (83.63 km^{2})
  - Land: 32.21 sq mi (83.43 km^{2})
  - Water: 0.077 sq mi (0.20 km^{2})
- Elevation: 604 ft (184 m)

Population (2010)
  - Total: 2,369
  - Estimate (2016): 2,294
  - Density: 71/sq mi (27.5/km^{2})
- Time zone: UTC-5 (Eastern (EST))
  - Summer (DST): UTC-4 (EDT)
- ZIP Codes: 14422 (Byron); 14557 (South Byron); 14058 (Elba); 14416 (Bergen)
- Area code: 585
- FIPS code: 36-037-11572
- GNIS feature ID: 0978771
- Website: Town of Byron

Byron is a town in Genesee County, New York, United States. The town is named after a famous poet, Lord Byron. It on the northern border of the county, and lies northeast of the city of Batavia. The population was 2,369 at the 2010 census. The local school district, Byron-Bergen Central School District, is shared with the town of Bergen.

== History ==
Byron was first settled circa 1807. The town was incorporated in 1820 from part of the town of Bergen.

On January 12, 1919, there was a New York Central train wreck in South Byron, killing 22.

Byron was traditionally a rural area of dairy and vegetable farms.

== Geography ==
According to the United States Census Bureau, the town has a total area of 32.2 square miles (83 km^{2}), of which 32.2 square miles (83 km^{2}) is land and 0.1 square miles (0.26 km^{2}), or 0.19%, is water.

== Demographics ==
Historical population
Census	Pop.	Note	%±
1830	1,939		—
1840	1,907		−1.7%
1850	1,566		−17.9%
1860	1,864		19.0%
1870	1,734		−7.0%
1880	1,754		1.2%
1890	1,578		−10.0%
1900	1,512		−4.2%
1910	1,520		0.5%
1920	1,273		−16.2%
1930	1,347		5.8%
1940	1,374		2.0%
1950	1,381		0.5%
1960	1,589		15.1%
1970	2,020		27.1%
1980	2,242		11.0%
1990	2,345		4.6%
2000	2,493		6.3%
2010	2,369		−5.0%
2016 (est.)	2,294		−3.2%
U.S. Decennial Census

As of the census of 2000, there were 2,493 people, 878 households, and 663 families residing in the town. The population density was 77.4 inhabitants per square mile (29.9/km^{2}). There were 922 housing units at an average density of 28.6 per square mile (11.0/km^{2}). The racial makeup of the town was 95.75% White, 0.28% African American, 0.64% Native American, 0.36% Asian, 0.04% Pacific Islander, 1.89% from other races, and 1.04% from two or more races. Hispanic or Latino of any race were 3.77% of the population.

There were 878 households, out of which 40.2% had children under the age of 18 living with them, 64.2% were married couples living together, 7.4% had a female householder with no husband present, and 24.4% were non-families. 18.6% of all households were made up of individuals, and 5.8% had someone living alone who was 65 years of age or older. The average household size was 2.84 and the average family size was 3.24. There are slightly more livestock, mostly cattle in the township than there are humans

In the town, the population was spread out, with 29.3% under the age of 18, 8.2% from 18 to 24, 31.4% from 25 to 44, 22.9% from 45 to 64, and 8.1% who were 65 years of age or older. The median age was 36 years. For every 100 females, there were 100.4 males. For every 100 females age 18 and over, there were 101.1 males.

The median income for a household in the town was $49,722, and the median income for a family was $56,927. Males had a median income of $38,828 versus $24,877 for females. The per capita income for the town was $19,825. About 3.7% of families and 5.0% of the population were below the poverty line, including 6.2% of those under age 18 and 6.4% of those age 65 or over.

== Notable people ==
- Lina Beecher, roller coaster engineer
- D. M. Martin, former football coach
- Sy Studley, former MLB player

== Communities and locations in the Town of Byron ==
- Byron (previously "Byron Center") – A hamlet located at the junction of Routes 237 and 262.
- Lidke's Hill – A location in the northern part of the town.
- Mosquito Point – A location in the northwest part of the town.
- Pumpkin Hill – A hamlet north of Byron hamlet on Route 237. It is also called "North Byron". The name Pumpkin Hill comes from a sign with a pumpkin shape at a former hotel.
- South Byron (originally "Brusselville") – A community south of Byron hamlet on Route 237. It lies along CSX Railroad's "Chicago Line"(formerly the main branch of the New York Central)
