= Genesee County, New York =

County in New York, United States

- County
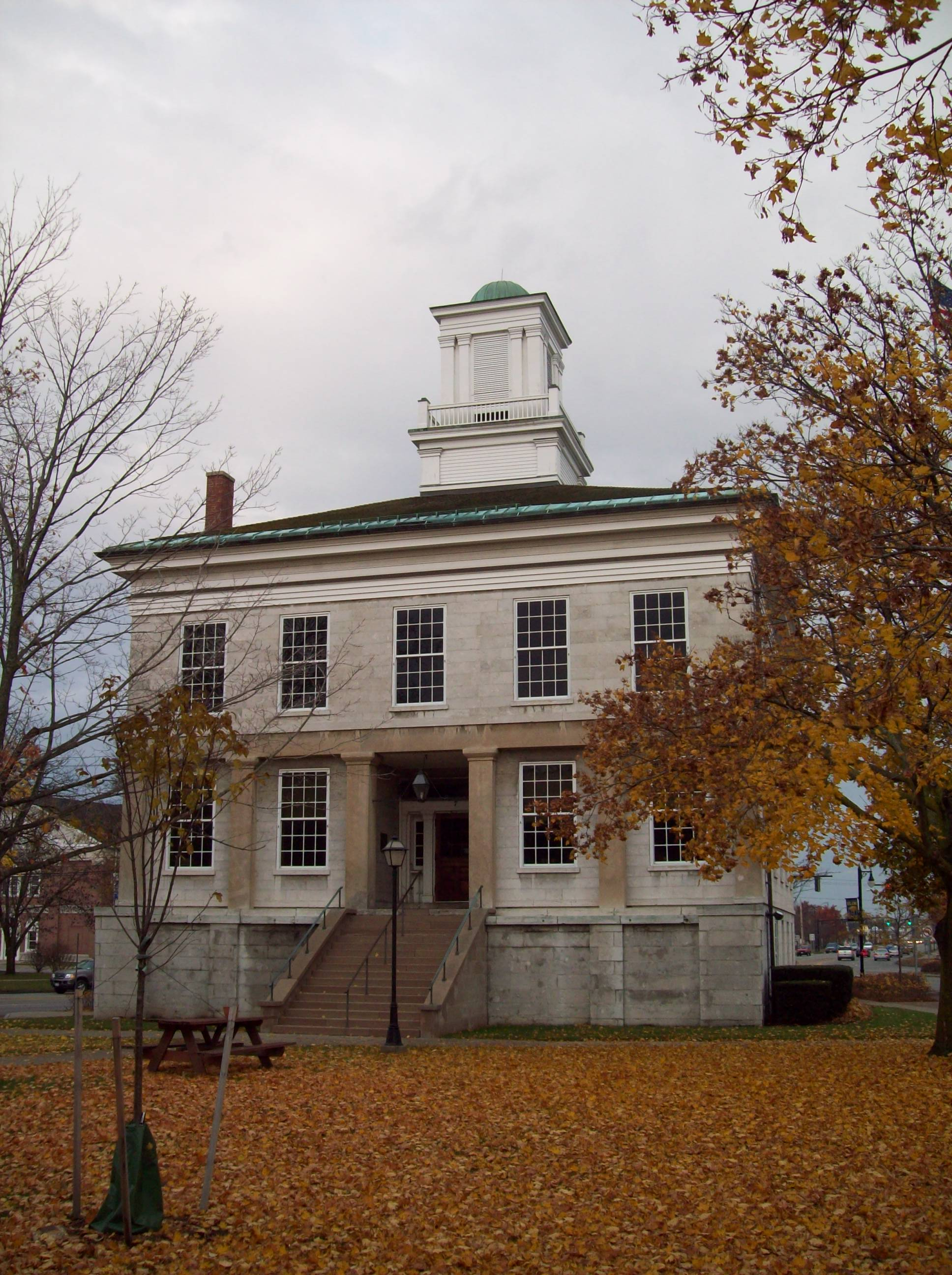
- Genesee County Courthouse

- Flag Seal

- Location within the U.S. state of New York
- Coordinates: 43°00′N 78°11′W
- Country: United States
- State: New York
- Founded: March 1803
- Named for: Seneca for "good valley"
- Seat: Batavia
- Largest city: Batavia

Area
  - Total: 495 sq mi (1,280 km^{2})
  - Land: 493 sq mi (1,280 km^{2})
  - Water: 2.4 sq mi (6.2 km^{2}) 0.5%

Population (2020)
  - Total: 58,388
  - Estimate (2025): 58,416 ▲
  - Density: 118/sq mi (45.7/km^{2})
- Time zone: UTC−5 (Eastern)
  - Summer (DST): UTC−4 (EDT)
- Congressional district: 24th
- Website: www.geneseeny.gov/Home

Genesee County is a county in the U.S. state of New York. As of the 2020 census, the population was 58,388. Its county seat is Batavia. Its name is from the Seneca word Gen-nis'-hee-yo, meaning "the Beautiful Valley". The county was created in 1802 and organized in 1803. The county is part of the Finger Lakes region of the state.

Genesee County comprises the Batavia, NY micropolitan statistical area, which is also in the Rochester-Batavia-Seneca Falls, NY combined statistical area. It is in Western New York. It is the namesake of Genesee County, Michigan.

== History ==
=== Precontact era ===
The archaeological record at the Hiscock Site, in Byron, New York goes back 10,000 to 12,000 years to the Ice Age. Researchers have found a variety of humanmade tools, ceramics, metal, and leather, along with a mastodon jaw, tusks, and teeth and assorted animal bones, indicating long occupation of the site. This site is among North America's most important for archaeological artifacts from the Ice Age.

Different Indigenous peoples lived in the area for thousands of years. Centuries before European arrival, the Iroquoian-speaking Seneca Nation developed in the central part of present-day New York; it became one of the first Five Nations of the Haudenosaunee (Iroquois Confederacy). Beginning in 1639 and lasting for the rest of the century, the Seneca led an invasion of Western New York as part of the Beaver Wars, driving out the existing tribes of Wenro, Erie and Neutrals.

=== Colonial and revolutionary era ===
When counties were established in New York in 1683, the present Genesee County was part of Albany County. This was an enormous county, including the northern part of New York, as well as all of the present state of Vermont and in theory extending westward to the Pacific Ocean. On March 12, 1772, what was left of Albany County was split into three parts, one remaining under the name Albany County. One of the other pieces, Tryon County, contained the western portion (thus, since no western boundary was specified, theoretically still extended west to the Pacific). In 1784, Tryon County was renamed as Montgomery County. Around this time, the Province of Pennsylvania and the Massachusetts Bay Colony also claimed the territory as their own, but New York did not enforce its territorial claim. In 1789 Ontario County was split off from Montgomery as a result of the Phelps and Gorham Purchase. Again, the county theoretically extended west to the Pacific Ocean.

=== New York State ===
Until the Holland Purchase of 1793, Western New York was not enforced as the territory of New York. Land in the region was sold through the Holland Land Company's office in Batavia, starting in 1801. All the land in Western New York was in the newly created Genesee County, and all of that was in the single town of Batavia.

Genesee County was created by a partition of 7,100 square miles (18,000 km^{2}) of land from Ontario County. The county was not fully organized so it remained under the supervision of Ontario County until it achieved full organization and separation during March 1803.

On April 7, 1806, Genesee's area was reduced to 5,550 square miles (14,400 km^{2}) due to a partition that created Allegany County. On March 8, 1808, Genesee's area was again reduced, this time to 1,650 square miles (4,300 km^{2}) due to a partition that created Cattaraugus, Chautauqua, and Niagara Counties. On February 23, 1821, Genesee's area was again reduced, this time to 1,450 square miles (3,800 km^{2}) due a complex partition that produced Livingston and Monroe Counties. On April 15, 1825, another partition reduced Genesee's area to 1,030 square miles (2,700 km^{2}) in the creation of Orleans County. On May 1, 1826, the Orleans partition was again surveyed, with 10 square miles (26 km^{2}) of land along the western half of the Orleans/Genesee border returned to Genesee. On March 19, 1841, Genesee's area was again reduced, this time to the 500 square miles (1,300 km^{2}) it remains to this day due to the partitioning to create Wyoming County.

=== 19th-century politics: Origins of antimasonry ===
Genesee County was included in the 19th-century "burned-over district" — the Western region of New York consumed by religious revivals and characterized by "the evangelical desire to convert the entire American population to Christianity and to create a 'moral, homogeneous commonwealth.'" This religious moral crusade provided the social atmosphere that allowed antimasonic sentiment to gain momentum as a significant church-oriented movement and, later, a grass-roots political party that became the nation's first third party.

By the 1820s, Freemasonry was prevalent in Genesee County. From 1821 to 1827, half of all county officials were Freemasons. In September 1826, William Morgan, a resident of Batavia, New York, disappeared after having been briefly imprisoned for failure to repay a debt. Morgan had been rejected from the Masonic lodge in Batavia, and, as a result, threatened to publish a book which exposed the secret rituals of Freemasonry. His disappearance and presumed murder ignited a campaign against Freemasonry. The investigation into Morgan's disappearance confronted major obstacles from government officials and the judiciary- positions that were largely occupied by Freemasons. The Morgan affair combined with existing suspicions and distrust of the secrecy of Freemasonry initiated mass meetings throughout the county to decide how the issue of Freemasonry should be handled. The Antimasonry crusade's original goal was to oust Masons from political offices. Through the political guidance of party organizers, such as Thurlow Weed and William H. Seward, the crusade developed into a political party that enjoyed a political stronghold in Genesee County and the rest of the "burned-over district."

The Antimasonic Party found strong support within Genesee County from 1827 to 1833. The party averaged 69 percent of the vote and won every county office. After continuous domination of Masonic politicians, citizens saw Antimasonry as a solution and an opportunity to restore justice and republicanism. The Baptist and Presbyterian churches favored Antimasonry and encouraged their members to renounce ties with the fraternity. The party was originally associated with populist rhetoric, however, strong Antimasonic sentiment throughout the county correlated with positive economic developments and high population densities. Larger towns, such as Batavia, the county seat and Le Roy, harbored the strongest support for the party. The timing of the creation of the Antimasonic Party coincided with a time in New York politics that encouraged the expansion of political participation. The party leaders made the Antimasonic Party, and later the Whig Party, a great success in Genesee County and other neighboring counties.

=== Modern day ===
In 2009, the City and Town of Batavia began exploring ways to merge or consolidate governmental systems.

== Geography ==
According to the U.S. Census Bureau, the county has a total area of 495 square miles (1,280 km^{2}), of which 493 square miles (1,280 km^{2}) is land and 2.4 square miles (6.2 km^{2}) (0.5%) is water. Genesee County is east of Buffalo and southwest of Rochester in the western portion of New York State.

=== Adjacent counties ===
- Erie County - west
- Livingston County - southeast
- Monroe County - northeast
- Niagara County - northwest
- Orleans County - north
- Wyoming County - south

=== Major highways ===
- Interstate 90 (New York State Thruway)
- Interstate 490
- U.S. Route 20
- New York State Route 5
- New York State Route 19
- New York State Route 33
- New York State Route 63
- New York State Route 77
- New York State Route 98

=== Genesee County watersheds ===
- Black Creek
- Canaseraga Creek to Oatka Creek, excluding Beards, Conesus and Cayuga Creek
- Honeoye Creeks
- Mud Creek
- Murder Creek
- Oak Orchard Creek
- Oatka Creek
- Ransom Creek to Mouth
- Tonawanda Creek, Middle and Upper

=== Lakes ===
- Diver's Lake
- Genesee Lake

=== National protected area ===
- Iroquois National Wildlife Refuge (part)

=== State protected areas ===
- Darien Lakes State Park
- Oak Orchard Wildlife Management Area
- Tonawanda Wildlife Management Area

=== County parks ===
- Genesee County Park and Forest consists of 430 acres (1.7 km^{2}) of forest and rolling hills.
- DeWitt Recreation Area is a 63-acre (250,000 m^{2}) park that includes a 38-acre (150,000 m^{2}) pond.

== Government and politics ==
Genesee County is governed by a 9–member legislature headed by a chairperson. Genesee County is part of the 8th Judicial District of the New York Supreme Court and the 4th Department of the New York Supreme Court, Appellate Division.

Office	District	Area of the county	Officeholder	Party	First took office
Congressman	New York's 24th congressional district	All	Claudia Tenney	Republican	2021
State Senator	61st State Senate District	All	Sean Ryan	Democratic	2021
State Assemblyman	139th State Assembly District	All	Stephen M. Hawley	Republican	2006

=== Presidential elections ===
Genesee County is solidly Republican at the Presidential level with Lyndon Johnson in 1964 being the only Democrat to ever carry the county. Since then the closest a Democrat has gotten to winning the county was Bill Clinton in 1996 when he lost to Bob Dole by 3 percent. In 2024 Donald Trump received 66.8 percent of the vote which was the best result for a Republican since 1956 when Dwight D. Eisenhower received 74.6 percent.

United States presidential election results for Genesee County, New York
Year	Republican		Democratic		Third party(ies)	
Year	No.	%	No.	%	No.	%
1884	4,631	53.22%	3,643	41.87%	427	4.91%
1888	4,952	55.07%	3,633	40.40%	408	4.54%
1892	4,289	51.99%	3,250	39.40%	710	8.61%
1896	5,190	61.50%	3,004	35.60%	245	2.90%
1900	5,385	59.82%	3,267	36.29%	350	3.89%
1904	5,810	63.89%	2,883	31.70%	401	4.41%
1908	5,794	62.26%	3,171	34.07%	341	3.66%
1912	3,231	39.10%	2,656	32.14%	2,377	28.76%
1916	5,590	64.39%	2,802	32.27%	290	3.34%
1920	9,628	74.50%	2,570	19.89%	725	5.61%
1924	11,101	71.43%	3,384	21.77%	1,057	6.80%
1928	13,251	69.03%	5,181	26.99%	763	3.97%
1932	11,881	64.80%	6,152	33.55%	302	1.65%
1936	13,292	66.23%	6,177	30.78%	600	2.99%
1940	14,503	68.32%	6,664	31.39%	62	0.29%
1944	13,478	66.32%	6,796	33.44%	50	0.25%
1948	12,650	62.80%	7,024	34.87%	468	2.32%
1952	16,606	70.85%	6,819	29.10%	12	0.05%
1956	17,614	74.64%	5,986	25.36%	0	0.00%
1960	14,724	58.70%	10,343	41.23%	18	0.07%
1964	8,114	34.03%	15,713	65.91%	14	0.06%
1968	12,418	53.64%	9,533	41.18%	1,199	5.18%
1972	17,107	66.28%	8,631	33.44%	73	0.28%
1976	14,567	57.04%	10,803	42.30%	166	0.65%
1980	11,650	47.57%	10,677	43.60%	2,162	8.83%
1984	16,582	65.78%	8,549	33.91%	79	0.31%
1988	14,182	58.29%	9,945	40.87%	205	0.84%
1992	11,663	44.47%	8,071	30.78%	6,491	24.75%
1996	10,821	44.64%	10,074	41.56%	3,343	13.79%
2000	14,459	55.45%	10,191	39.08%	1,424	5.46%
2004	16,725	60.64%	10,331	37.46%	524	1.90%
2008	15,705	58.40%	10,762	40.02%	423	1.57%
2012	14,607	59.03%	9,601	38.80%	538	2.17%
2016	16,915	63.99%	7,650	28.94%	1,867	7.06%
2020	18,876	64.61%	9,625	32.94%	716	2.45%
2024	18,997	66.79%	9,367	32.93%	80	0.28%

=== Law enforcement ===
The primary law enforcement agency is the Genesee County Sheriff's Office.

In most counties in N.Y., the undersheriff is the warden of the county jail. In Genesee County, the sheriff has ultimate authority to operate the 80-bed county jail, built in 1985. In this county, rather than an undersheriff, it is managed by a "jail superintendent" with 27 other employees and managers. The current Genesee County Jail was built in 1985.

== Demographics ==
Historical population
Census	Pop.	Note	%±
1810	12,588		—
1820	58,093		361.5%
1830	52,147		−10.2%
1840	59,587		14.3%
1850	28,488		−52.2%
1860	32,189		13.0%
1870	31,606		−1.8%
1880	32,806		3.8%
1890	33,265		1.4%
1900	34,561		3.9%
1910	37,615		8.8%
1920	37,976		1.0%
1930	44,468		17.1%
1940	44,481		0.0%
1950	47,584		7.0%
1960	53,994		13.5%
1970	58,722		8.8%
1980	59,400		1.2%
1990	60,060		1.1%
2000	60,370		0.5%
2010	60,079		−0.5%
2020	58,388		−2.8%
2025 (est.)	58,416	▲	0.0%
U.S. Decennial Census; 1790-1960 1900-1990; 1990-2000 2010-2020

|estyear=2023 |estimate=57529 |estref=

=== 2020 census ===
Genesee County, New York – Racial and ethnic composition Note: the US Census treats Hispanic/Latino as an ethnic category. This table excludes Latinos from the racial categories and assigns them to a separate category. Hispanics/Latinos may be of any race.
Race / Ethnicity (NH = Non-Hispanic)	Pop 1980	Pop 1990	Pop 2000	Pop 2010	Pop 2020	% 1980	% 1990	% 2000	% 2010	% 2020
White alone (NH)	57,191	57,660	56,799	54,990	50,960	96.28%	96.00%	94.08%	91.53%	87.28%
Black or African American alone (NH)	1,102	1,038	1,217	1,491	1,358	1.86%	1.73%	2.02%	2.48%	2.33%
Native American or Alaska Native alone (NH)	613	671	449	661	361	1.03%	1.12%	0.74%	1.10%	0.62%
Asian alone (NH)	101	209	290	355	412	0.17%	0.35%	0.48%	0.59%	0.71%
Native Hawaiian or Pacific Islander alone (NH)	x	x	13	2	16	x	x	0.02%	0.00%	0.03%
Other race alone (NH)	68	31	77	55	173	0.11%	0.05%	0.13%	0.09%	0.30%
Mixed race or Multiracial (NH)	x	x	621	909	2,356	x	x	1.03%	1.51%	4.04%
Hispanic or Latino (any race)	325	451	904	1,616	2,752	0.55%	0.75%	1.50%	2.69%	4.71%
Total	59,400	60,060	60,370	60,079	58,388	100.00%	100.00%	100.00%	100.00%	100.00%

=== 2000 census ===
As of the 2000 census, there were 60,370 people, 22,770 households, and 15,825 families residing in the county. The population density was 122 people per square mile (47 people/km^{2}). There were 24,190 housing units, with an average density of 49 units per square mile (19/km^{2}). The county's racial makeup was 94.69% White, 2.13% Black or African American, 0.78% Native American, 0.48% Asian, 0.02% Pacific Islander, 0.71% from other races, and 1.18% from two or more races. 1.50% of the population were Hispanic or Latino of any race. 25.0% were of German, 15.2% Italian, 13.5% English, 13.1% Irish, 8.9% Polish and 5.6% American ancestry according to Census 2000. 96.5% spoke English and 1.5% Spanish as their first language.

There were 22,770 households, of which 33.30% had children under the age of 18. 55.4% were married couples living together, 9.80% had a female householder with no husband present, and 30.50% were non-families. 24.80% of households were made up of individuals, and 11.10% had someone living alone who was 65 years of age or older. The average household size was 2.59 and the average family size was 3.10.

26.10% of the county's population was under the age of 18, 7.50% were from age 18 to 24, 29.50% were from age 25 to 44, 22.60% were from age 45 to 64, and 14.30% were age 65 or older. The median age was 37 years. For every 100 females there were 96.90 males. For every 100 females age 18 and over, there were 95.00 males.

The U.S. Census in 2000 showed the county had a 63.7% employment rate and 2.9% were unemployed. The median household income was $40,542, and the median family income was $47,771. Males had a median income of $34,430 versus $23,788 for females. The county's per capita income was $18,498. About 5.60% of families and 7.60% of the population were below the poverty line, including 9.00% of those under age 18 and 6.80% of those age 65 or over.

== Education ==
The county has eight public school districts:

- Akron Central School District
- Alden Central School District
- Alexander Central School District
- Attica Central School District
- Batavia City School District
- Byron-Bergen Central School District
- Elba Central School District
- Le Roy Central School District
- Oakfield-Alabama Central School District
- Pavilion Central School District
- Pembroke Central School District

It has one state-operated school: New York State School for the Blind

Several private schools at the primary and secondary levels are also maintained (Catholic schools are affiliated with the Roman Catholic Diocese of Buffalo):

- St.Joseph's School, Batavia
- Notre Dame High School, Batavia
- St. Paul Lutheran School, Batavia

Genesee Community College has its main campus in the Town of Batavia.

== Communities ==
=== Larger Settlements ===
#	Location	Population	Type	Sector
1	†Batavia	15,600	City	Northwest
2	Le Roy	4,391	Village	Southeast
3	‡Attica	2,547	Village	Southwest
4	Oakfield	1,813	Village	Northwest
5	Bergen	1,176	Village	Northeast
6	Corfu	709	Village	Southwest
7	Elba	676	Village	Northeast
8	Pavilion	646	CDP	Southeast
9	Alexander	509	Village	Southwest

† - County Seat

‡ - Not Wholly in this County

=== Towns ===
- Alabama
- Alexander
- Batavia
- Bergen
- Bethany
- Byron
- Darien
- Elba
- Le Roy
- Oakfield
- Pavilion
- Pembroke
- Stafford

=== Other hamlets ===
- East Bethany
- Indian Falls
- North Bergen

=== Indian reservations ===
- Tonawanda Reservation

== See also ==
- Holland Purchase
- List of counties in New York
- National Register of Historic Places listings in Genesee County, New York
