= Elba (village), New York =

Elba, New York
- Village
- Nickname: "Onion Capital of the World"
- Location in Genesee County and the state of New York
- Coordinates: 43°4′35″N 78°11′2″W
- Country: United States
- State: New York
- County: Genesee
- Town: Elba

Area
  - Total: 1.02 sq mi (2.63 km^{2})
  - Land: 1.02 sq mi (2.63 km^{2})
  - Water: 0 sq mi (0.00 km^{2})
- Elevation: 761 ft (232 m)

Population (2020)
  - Total: 558
  - Density: 547.06/sq mi (211.22/km^{2})
- Time zone: UTC-5 (Eastern (EST))
  - Summer (DST): UTC-4 (EDT)
- ZIP Code: 14058
- Area code: 585
- FIPS code: 36-23745
- GNIS feature ID: 0949446
- Website: villageofelba.com

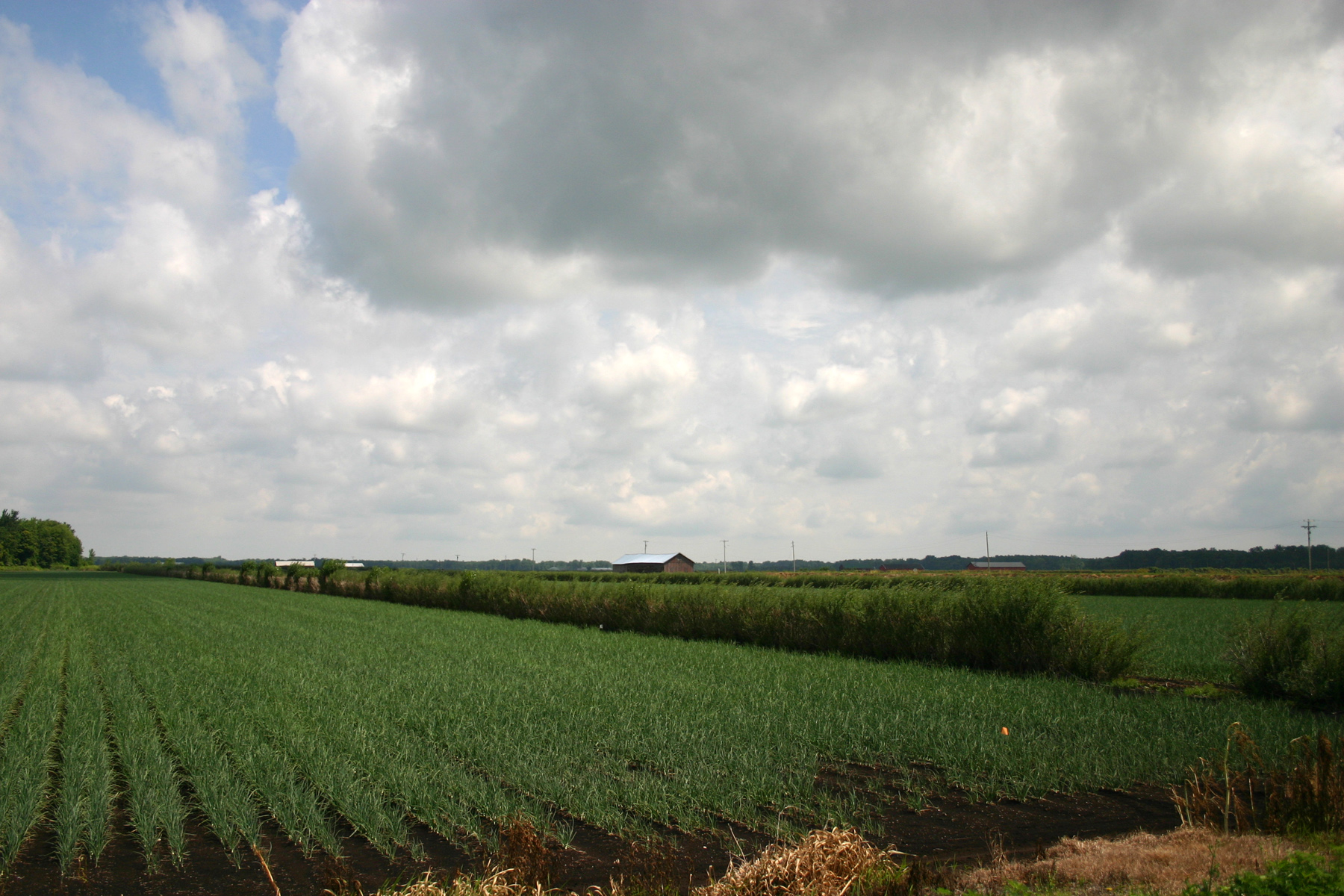
Elba muckland onion fields; part of Torrey Farms

Elba is a village within the town of Elba in Genesee County, New York, United States. The population was 558 at the 2020 census, out of 2,164 in the entire town of Elba. The village population has dropped from 676 in 2010.

The village of Elba is north of Batavia at the intersection of NYS Route 98 and NYS Route 262.

Elba claims to be the "Onion Capital of the World". Torrey Farms, one of the largest farms in New York, is located in Elba with about 8,000 acres (32 km^{2}). They also own about 2,000 acres (8.1 km^{2}) of muckland in Potter, New York, where they grow a large number of onions.

Elba hosts its annual Onion Festival on the first weekend of August. The festival draws the vast majority of Elba residents as well as people from neighboring towns in Genesee County, and some from all over New York. Among the events are the Fireman's Parade, Kiddie Parade, raffling of a car (usually a new Mustang GT), and the crowning of an "Onion Queen". All profits from the festival go towards the funding of the Elba Fire Department. Although in 2016 the Onion Festival was not held, an Onion Queen continues to be selected each year for scholarship opportunities.

== History ==
The site of the town was first settled in 1804, by John Roraback, a weaver. The village of Elba was incorporated in 1884. Previously, in 1882, an attempt to incorporate "Pine Hill" as the town's name led to dissension and a lawsuit. The name "Pine Hill" was derived from a Native American name for the area.

Elba was a stop on the Underground Railroad. There literally was an underground section, as there was a tunnel underneath Main Street between the inn and the home of its owner, Elias Pettibone, which is now collapsed.

== Geography ==
The village is located in northern Genesee County near the center of the town of Elba. New York State Route 98 runs through the village as Main Street, leading north 11 miles (18 km) to Albion and south 5 miles (8 km) to Batavia, the Genesee County seat. New York State Route 262 passes through the southern part of the village, leading east 6 miles (10 km) to Byron and west 4 miles (6 km) to Oakfield.

According to the United States Census Bureau, the town has a total area of 1.0 square mile (2.6 km^{2}), all land.

== Demographics ==
Historical population
Census	Pop.	Note	%±
1890	428		—
1900	395		−7.7%
1910	351		−11.1%
1920	577		64.4%
1930	562		−2.6%
1940	614		9.3%
1950	569		−7.3%
1960	739		29.9%
1970	752		1.8%
1980	750		−0.3%
1990	703		−6.3%
2000	696		−1.0%
2010	676		−2.9%
2020	558		−17.5%
U.S. Decennial Census

As of the census of 2000, there were 696 people, 245 households, and 190 families residing in the town. The population density was 684.2 inhabitants per square mile (264.2/km^{2}). There were 258 housing units at an average density of 253.6 per square mile (97.9/km^{2}). The racial makeup of the village was 96.41% White, 1.44% Black or African American, 0.57% Native American, 0.14% Asian, 1.15% from other races, and 0.29% from two or more races. Hispanic or Latino of any race were 3.30% of the population.

There were 245 households, out of which 38.8% had children under the age of 18 living with them, 63.7% were married couples living together, 9.8% had a female householder with no husband present, and 22.4% were non-families. 20.4% of all households were made up of individuals, and 11.4% had someone living alone who was 65 years of age or older. The average household size was 2.84 and the average family size was 3.28.

In the town, the population was spread out, with 28.3% under the age of 18, 9.6% from 18 to 24, 28.9% from 25 to 44, 20.5% from 45 to 64, and 12.6% who were 65 years of age or older. The median age was 37 years. For every 100 females, there were 102.9 males. For every 100 females age 18 and over, there were 89.0 males.

The median income for a household in the town was $47,614, and the median income for a family was $51,042. Males had a median income of $40,156 versus $30,192 for females. The per capita income for the town was $18,246. About 5.6% of families and 5.7% of the population were below the poverty line, including 6.1% of those under age 18 and none of those age 65 or over.

== Notable people ==
- Bill Kauffman, paleoconservative political writer
- B. S. Potter, former Wisconsin State Assembly member
