= Bergen, New York =

Bergen, New York Northwoods
- Town
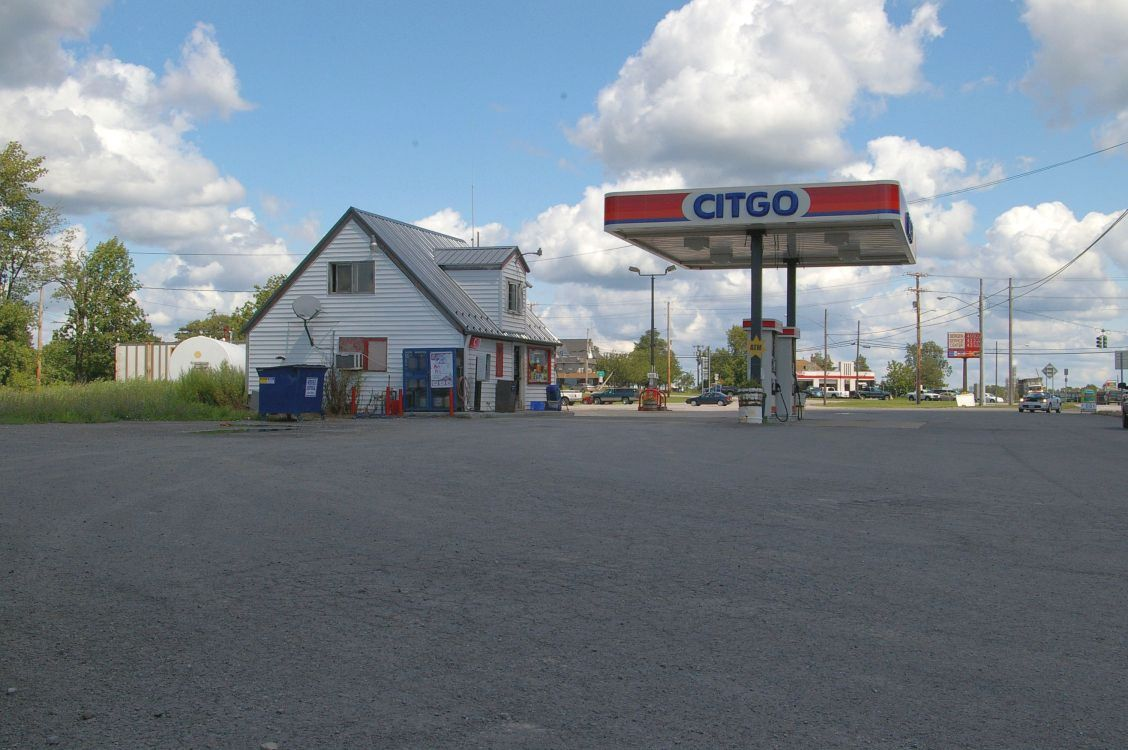
- Gas station in Bergen

- Location in Genesee County and the state of New York
- Coordinates: 43°5′N 77°57′W
- Country: United States
- State: New York
- County: Genesee
- Settled: 1801
- Named for: Bergen, Norway

Government
  - Type: Town Council
  - Town Supervisor: Donald S. Cunningham
  - Town Council: Members: • Hugh F. McCartney; • Barry Miller; • Rachael J. Millspaugh; • Joseph Nenni

Area
  - Total: 27.59 sq mi (71.47 km^{2})
  - Land: 27.56 sq mi (71.38 km^{2})
  - Water: 0.035 sq mi (0.09 km^{2})

Population (2020)
  - Total: 3,120
  - Estimate (2016): 2,999
  - Density: 108.8/sq mi (42.02/km^{2})
- Time zone: UTC-5 (Eastern (EST))
  - Summer (DST): UTC-4 (EDT)
- ZIP Code: 14416
- FIPS code: 36-037-06057
- Website: Town of Bergen

Bergen is a town in Genesee County, New York, United States. The town is in the northeastern corner of the county. The population was 3,120 at the 2020 census. There is also a village of Bergen in the town.

== History ==
Bergen is one of the mid-sized towns in Genesee County. It was part of the Triangle Tract and the 100,000 Acre Tract (or the Connecticut Tract) in the Morris Reserve. It is a portion of the triangular tract sold to Le Roy and others from the Morris Reserve, and it contains two tiers of lots from the Connecticut tract. The latter are in the western part of the town. The community was named for a city on the west coast of Norway.

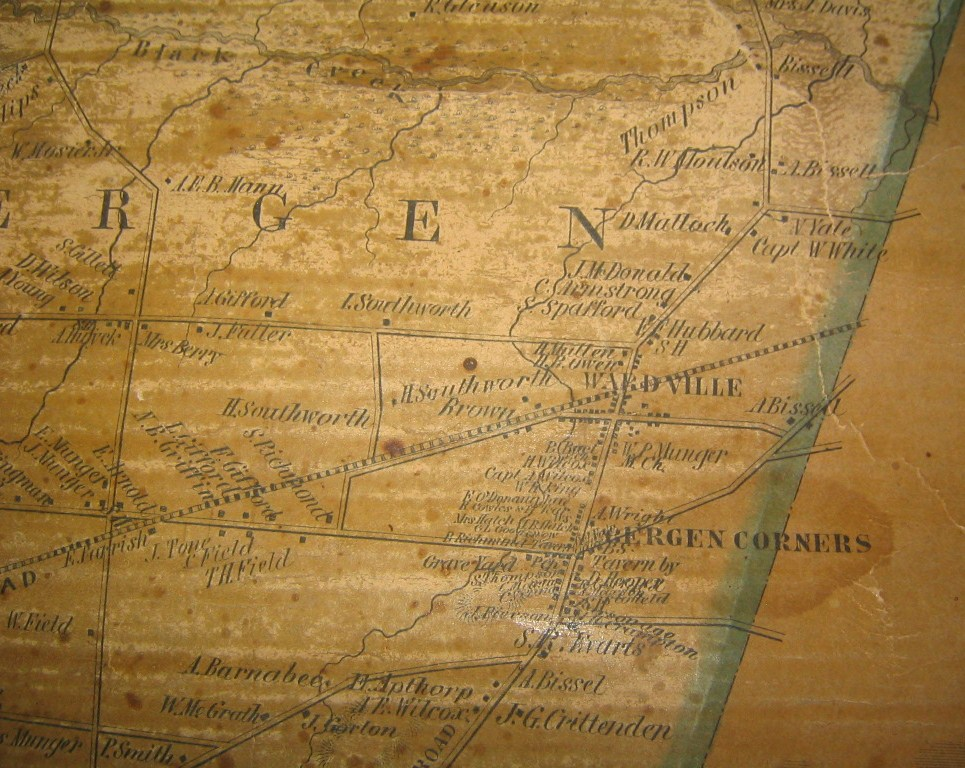
Wardville and Bergen Corners in 1854

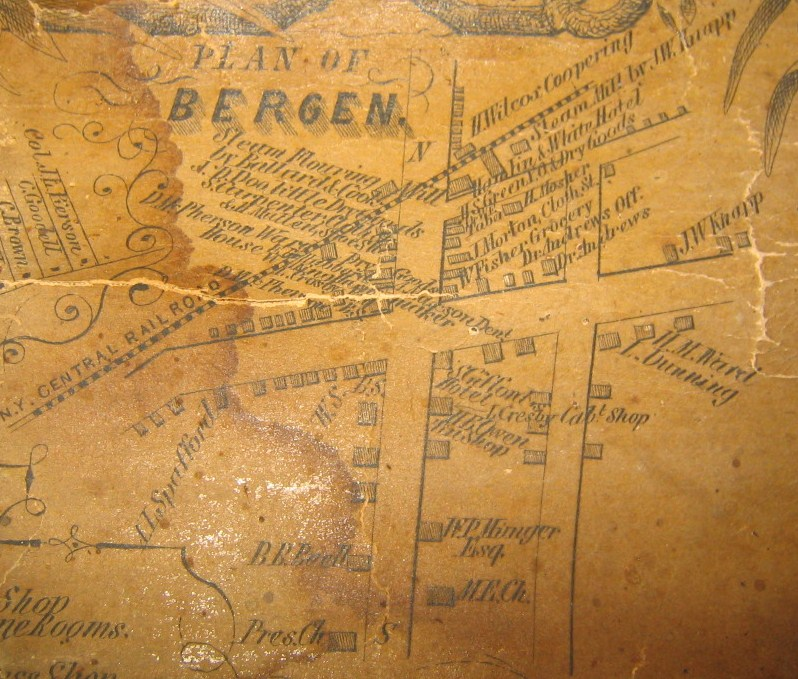
Downtown Bergen in 1854

The Bergen area was opened up in 1801 when a road was hacked through the thick "Northwoods" region from LeRoy to Lake Ontario. (In its early days of settlement, Bergen was in fact called "Northwoods".) Bergen was first settled in 1801 by Samuel Lincoln. In the same year George Letson, William Letson, Benajah Worden, Richard Abbey, Solomon Levi, Jesse Leach, James Letson, Gideon Elliott and David Scott settled in town. A colony of 60 families from Connecticut settled the area along present-day Route 19 from Fort Hill (near Parmalee Road) to Black Creek between 1805 and 1810. The first store was a mile south of current Route 33 on Route 19 on the east side of the road. The first group of stores was located from the intersection of Lake Road (Route 19) and Route 262 to the intersection of Route 19 and Scottsville Road (Route 33A). This area was called "Buell's Corner", later "Bergen Corners" or "High Bergen". The first church organization was established in December 1807. The Congregational church was founded January 25, 1808. Harry Kelsey, a graduate of Yale College, taught the first school. The first frame house in the town was erected by Dr. Levi Ward, the pioneer physician. Jared Merritt built the first sawmill. Dr. Ward was also proprietor of the first store, in 1808. The first inn was opened in 1809 by Samuel Butler. Colonel W. H. Ward was the first postmaster.

Bergen was erected from the town of Murray (which was divided into three towns) on April 2, 1813. It was also part of the town of Northampton. The town of Byron was part of Bergen until 1820.

After the railroad came through in 1836, an area was laid out around the intersection of Lake Road (Route 19) and the railroad for businesses and houses. It was called "Wardville" after the Levi Ward family who laid it out. It was also called "Cork", after the Irish who settled there during and after the building of the railroad, and "Lower Bergen". The two areas were soon connected by residences and churches.

Fire initially destroyed the business area around the railroad tracks in 1866.

This area, along with the surrounding residences, was incorporated in on March 5, 1877, as the village of Bergen. The village of Bergen is located near the center of the eastern boundary line, on the New York Central and Hudson River Railroad.

Fire destroyed the business area around the railroad tracks again in 1880. The Village Board passed an ordinance requiring that all structures in this area should be built of brick or stone or wrought iron.

The west side of the district south of the railroad is on the National Register of Historic Places due to its 1880 wrought-iron store fronts, transom windows and probably, also, because of the famous family who founded "Wardville". Some of the family went on from Bergen to the Rochester area and were also primary developers of that area.

Due to the building material and better fire fighting equipment, a fire in 1906 destroyed only some of the buildings on the west side of the street. A fire in 1932 leveled some of the buildings on the east side of the street. Since then fires in individual buildings have caused some alteration of the facade of the buildings.

When glaciers of the fourth ice age retreated from the northeast corner of New York State 125,000 years ago, they left behind 2,000 acres (8.1 km^{2}) of forested wetlands now known as the Bergen Swamp. The wildlife area was designated a National Natural Landmark in 1964 and is home to dozens of species of unusual birds, reptiles and rare flowers that thrive in an undisturbed environment.

== Geography ==
According to the United States Census Bureau, the town has a total area of 27.6 square miles (71.6 km^{2}), of which 27.6 square miles (71.6 km^{2}) is land and 0.04% is water.

Bergen Swamp, a glacial feature now kept as a wildlife preserve, is home to a small endangered rattlesnake, the Eastern Massasauga, as well as a large diversity of other species.

The eastern town line is the border of Monroe County, and the northern town line is the border of both Monroe County and Orleans County.

Interstate 490 passes through the southeast part of the town.

== Demographics ==
Historical population
Census	Pop.	Note	%±
1820	2,438		—
1830	1,508		−38.1%
1840	1,832		21.5%
1850	1,897		3.5%
1860	2,008		5.9%
1870	1,997		−0.5%
1880	2,002		0.3%
1890	1,830		−8.6%
1900	1,699		−7.2%
1910	1,631		−4.0%
1920	1,497		−8.2%
1930	1,512		1.0%
1940	1,412		−6.6%
1950	1,588		12.5%
1960	1,996		25.7%
1970	2,281		14.3%
1980	2,568		12.6%
1990	2,794		8.8%
2000	3,182		13.9%
2010	3,120		−1.9%
2016 (est.)	2,999	▼	−3.9%
U.S. Decennial Census

As of the census of 2000, there were 3,182 people, 1,196 households, and 857 families residing in the town. The population density was 115.2 inhabitants per square mile (44.5/km^{2}). There were 1,240 housing units at an average density of 44.9 per square mile (17.3/km^{2}). The racial makeup of the town was 97.27% White, 0.31% Black or African American, 0.25% Native American, 0.50% Asian, 0.79% from other races, and 0.88% from two or more races. Hispanic or Latino of any race were 1.01% of the population.

There were 1,196 households, out of which 34.2% had children under the age of 18 living with them, 61.8% were married couples living together, 5.6% had a female householder with no husband present, and 28.3% were non-families. 21.8% of all households were made up of individuals, and 9.7% had someone living alone who was 65 years of age or older. The average household size was 2.66 and the average family size was 3.14.

In the town, the population was spread out, with 26.6% under the age of 18, 7.3% from 18 to 24, 30.7% from 25 to 44, 23.6% from 45 to 64, and 11.8% who were 65 years of age or older. The median age was 37 years. For every 100 females, there were 102.9 males. For every 100 females age 18 and over, there were 101.6 males.

The median income for a household in the town was $49,412, and the median income for a family was $54,012. Males had a median income of $36,913 versus $26,571 for females. The per capita income for the town was $20,932. About 1.6% of families and 4.1% of the population were below the poverty line, including 2.8% of those under age 18 and 7.3% of those age 65 or over.

== Notable people ==
- Galusha Anderson, theologian
- Bucky Freeman, former football and baseball coach
- William Henry Munger, former US federal judge
- Lewis S. Payne, former New York state senator
- Billy Sands, character actor

== Communities and locations in the Town of Bergen ==
- Bergen – A village in the eastern part of the town on Route 19.
- East Bergen – A hamlet on Route 19 in the northeast corner of the town.
- Jerico Corners – A location at the intersection of Jerico and Swamp Roads.
- Little Boston
- North Bergen – A hamlet in the northwest corner of the town.
- Sheepskin Corners
- Stone Church – A hamlet south of Bergen village on Route 19.
- West Bergen – A hamlet near the western town line.
- West Sweden
