= Oakfield (village), New York =

Oakfield, New York
- Village
- Location in Genesee County and the state of New York
- Coordinates: 43°4′0″N 78°16′13″W
- Country: United States
- State: New York
- County: Genesee

Area
  - Total: 0.66 sq mi (1.71 km^{2})
  - Land: 0.66 sq mi (1.71 km^{2})
  - Water: 0 sq mi (0.00 km^{2})
- Elevation: 750 ft (230 m)

Population (2020)
  - Total: 1,812
  - Density: 2,743.3/sq mi (1,059.21/km^{2})
- Time zone: UTC-5 (Eastern (EST))
  - Summer (DST): UTC-4 (EDT)
- ZIP code: 14125
- Area code: 585
- FIPS code: 36-54155
- GNIS feature ID: 0959164
- Website: villageofoakfieldny.gov

Oakfield is a village in Genesee County, New York, United States. As of the 2010 census, the village population was 1,813. The village lies within the town of Oakfield in northern Genesee County. The village is at the intersection of Route 63 (Lewiston Road) and Route 262. It is northwest of Batavia.

== History ==
The community was called "Caryville" and "Plain Brook" in the past. The village was incorporated in 1858, changing its name to "Oakfield" at that time.

== Geography ==
The village is in the southern part of the town of Oakfield, 6 miles (10 km) northwest of Batavia, the county seat, by NY Route 63, and 16 miles (26 km) southeast of Medina. NY Route 262 leads east 4 miles (6 km) to Elba.

According to the United States Census Bureau, the village has a total area of 0.66 square miles (1.7 km^{2}), all land.

== Demographics ==
Historical population
Census	Pop.	Note	%±
1890	578		—
1900	714		23.5%
1910	1,226		71.7%
1920	1,422		16.0%
1930	1,919		35.0%
1940	1,876		−2.2%
1950	1,781		−5.1%
1960	2,070		16.2%
1970	1,964		−5.1%
1980	1,791		−8.8%
1990	1,818		1.5%
2000	1,805		−0.7%
2010	1,813		0.4%
2020	1,812		−0.1%
U.S. Decennial Census

As of the census of 2000, there were 1,805 people, 648 households, and 465 families residing in the village. The population density was 2,721.4 inhabitants per square mile (1,050.7/km^{2}). There were 702 housing units at an average density of 1,058.4 per square mile (408.7/km^{2}). The racial makeup of the village was 96.95% White, 1.22% Black or African American, 0.06% Native American, 0.22% Asian, 0.66% from other races, and 0.89% from two or more races. 0.94% of the population were Hispanic or Latino of any race.

There were 648 households, out of which 39.4% had children under the age of 18 living with them, 57.3% were married couples living together, 11.0% had a female householder with no husband present, and 28.2% were non-families. 22.1% of all households were made up of individuals, and 11.4% had someone living alone who was 65 years of age or older. The average household size was 2.77 and the average family size was 3.25.

In the village, the population was spread out, with 29.7% under the age of 18, 7.5% from 18 to 24, 30.4% from 25 to 44, 19.4% from 45 to 64, and 13.0% who were 65 years of age or older. The median age was 34 years. For every 100 females, there were 93.0 males. For every 100 females age 18 and over, there were 88.6 males.

The median income for a household in the village was $40,580, and the median income for a family was $45,270. Males had a median income of $32,981 versus $21,897 for females. The per capita income for the village was $15,962. 11.6% of the population and 8.0% of families were below the poverty line. Out of the total population, 15.8% of those under the age of 18 and 7.8% of those 65 and older were living below the poverty line.

== Religion ==
Religious diversity is low, with all religious institutions adhering to Christianity. There are presently five churches in the village:

- Oakfield United Methodist Church
- Oakfield Community Bible Church
- St. Cecilia's Roman Catholic Church
- St. Michael's Episcopal Church
- Genesee Country Church

== See also ==
- Oakfield, New York
