= Mount Pleasant (Indian Falls, New York) =

Historic house in New York, United States

- U.S. National Register of Historic Places
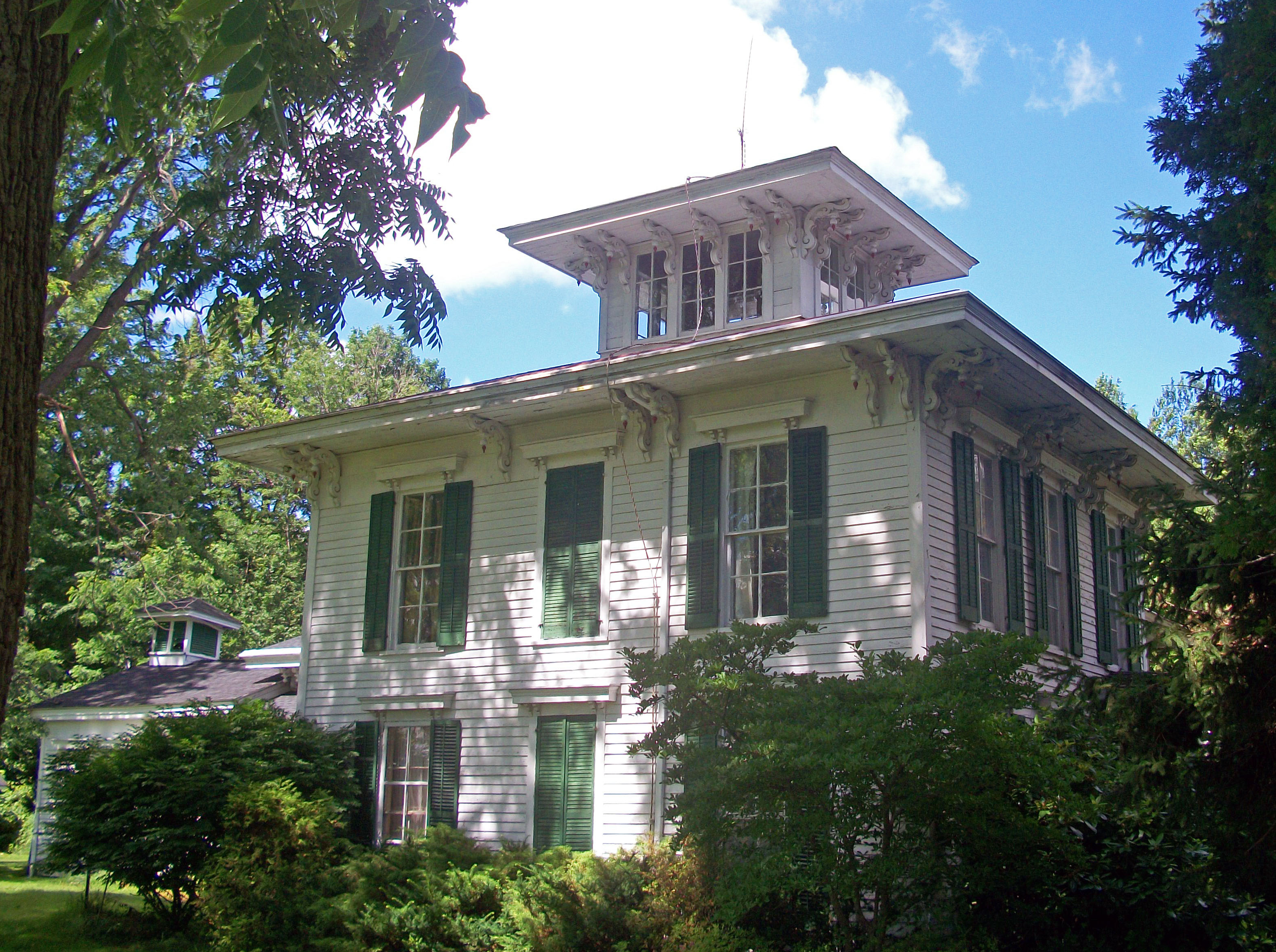
- East profile and north (front) elevation, 2010

- Location within New York Location within the United States
- Location: Town of Pembroke, NY
- Nearest city: Corfu, New York
- Coordinates: 43°0′51″N 78°20′45″W
- Area: 31 acres (13 ha)
- Built: 1861
- Architect: Mook, Abram
- Architectural style: Italianate
- NRHP reference No.: 84002393
- Added to NRHP: August 09, 1984

Mount Pleasant is a farm complex located in the Town of Pembroke, New York, United States, east of the hamlet of Indian Falls. It was established in the mid-19th century.

The main dwelling is a sophisticated Italianate style wood frame house. It and the other buildings have remained mostly intact since their construction. The farm was listed on the National Register of Historic Places in 1984.

== Buildings and grounds ==
The farm is located on the south side of Indian Falls Road (Genesee County Route 4), a half-mile (1 km) west of where the road bends to the south and crosses the New York State Thruway and 3.5 miles (5.6 km) east of New York State Route 77 just south of Tonawanda Creek and the hamlet of Indian Falls. The terrain is generally level and the area rural, with most land used for fields and houses clustered along the road. The Mt. Pleasant property is a 31-acre (13 ha) parcel bordered by the Thruway on the south. A southern portion on the opposite side of the Thruway is no longer visually and physically connected with the farm and is not included with the listing.

An original circular driveway leads into a triangular, uncleared northern portion of the property where the buildings are located. Hedgerows of mature trees separate this grassy area from the farmland. A three-foot (1 m) retaining wall of Medina sandstone sets off the main house from the road. The farm has a total of eight contributing resources, five buildings and three structures.

=== Main house ===
The house itself is a clapboard-sided stricture with five sections. Its main block is a two-story rectangular structure with a gently pitched hipped roof pierced by a square central cupola. Both it and the house itself have wide overhanging eaves supported by paired brackets. The four-over-four double-hung sash windows are flanked by louvered wooden shutters and topped by wooden lintels with miniature brackets.

Its main entrance is on the west elevation, sheltered by a porch with clustered columns supporting a roof with decorative scrollwork balustrade. From this side projects a one-and-a-half-story wing with a shallow hip roof. It has a porch on its north facade with a similar treatment to the one on the main block. A brick flue pierces its roof at the west.

Three segmental gable-roofed additions project to the south of the west wing. The westernmost is one and a half stories, with wide projecting eaves supported by paired brackets with pendants. A brick chimney pierces the roof at the center. The wing's west side has a small porch similar to the other two, and a shed-roofed projection on its east. On its rear is the carriage house, with a belfry on top, and on its south the privy, with its original planked door.

The main house's floor plan has remained relatively unchanged, save for some changes to the bedrooms on the first floor. Many of its finishes are original as well, such as the door and window surrounds, moldings, wainscoting, high ceilings and pine flooring. The front hall and parlor (now a bedroom) have their original plaster ceiling medallions. The cold pantry has slate walls and the kitchen pantry its original marble shelves. The stairway to the cupola has been enclosed, the only change on the second floor.

=== Outbuildings ===
Due south of the main house is a garage, believed to be the original house on the property. It is a one-story gabled wood-frame structure with its original vertical board siding, paneled door and shed-roofed addition on the west. To its east is the original smokehouse, a one-story brick building on a stone foundation with a shallow hip roof.

The barn is to the west. It is a two-and-a-half-story structure with vertical siding, gambrel roof and assorted window configurations, with large sliding doors on the east elevation. On the east side of the barnyard formed between it and a second barn formerly to its east is one of the original wells, the three contributing structures. The other two wells are to the east and west of the main house.

== History ==
The farm was established around 1847 by Abram Mook, a German American from Pennsylvania who bought several tracts in the area from the Holland Land Company. In addition to clearing and farming them, he built what is now Indian Falls Road from North Pembroke Road to the old Indian trail that is now NY 77. The 1850 census lists his net worth at $3,500 ($135,000 in contemporary dollars).

In 1854 he bought the two parcels that make up the current farm and moved onto it. Records from that year show that the current garage was in existence at the time; it may have been the family residence. Mook and his brothers built a suspension bridge across the Tonawanda to connect their farms; the 1860 census shows that his family had grown by two and his wealth considerably increased.

The following year he hired seven carpenters to build the current house, replacing one on another nearby piece of land he owned that had burned down. The yellow pine and decorative features were shipped to Lockport on the Erie Canal and then delivered to the construction site. The building contrasts the ornamentation of a sophisticated Italianate villa of the time with the form of a more vernacular farmhouse of the time, particularly the projecting wings.

Mook died in 1908. His son lost the house to foreclosure the next year, and it and the farm became the property of the Stang brothers for $5,210 ($187,000 in contemporary dollars). In 1945 they sold it to LaVerne Lamkin, who owned it until the early 21st century.

== See also ==
- National Register of Historic Places listings in Genesee County, New York
