= Darien, New York =

Town in Genesee County, New York

Darien, New York Seneca: O’sóötgeh South Pembroke
- Town
- Location in Genesee County and the state of New York.
- Coordinates: 42°54′33″N 78°22′54″W
- Country: United States
- State: New York
- County: Genesee

Government
  - Type: Town council
  - Town supervisor: David Hagelberger
  - Town council: Members' list: • Linda P. Graber; • David Riker; • Christopher Nicastro; • Stephen J. Ferry, Jr.

Area
  - Total: 47.59 sq mi (123.26 km^{2})
  - Land: 47.37 sq mi (122.69 km^{2})
  - Water: 0.22 sq mi (0.57 km^{2})
- Elevation: 950 ft (290 m)

Population (2020)
  - Total: 3,010
  - Density: 63.5/sq mi (24.53/km^{2})
- Time zone: UTC−5 (Eastern (EST))
  - Summer (DST): UTC−4 (EDT)
- ZIP Codes: 14040 (Darien Center); 14036 (Corfu); 14005 (Alexander); 14004 (Alden)
- FIPS code: 36-037-19719
- GNIS feature ID: 0978886
- Website: Town of Darien

Darien (pronounced "Dare-E-Ann", Seneca: O’sóötgeh) is a town in Genesee County, New York, United States. The population was 3,010 at the 2020 census. Darien lies in the southwestern part of Genesee County, southwest of Batavia.

== History ==
During the early historic period, the area was occupied by the Seneca people and was referred to by them as O’sóötgeh or "turkey place".

The area was settled by Europeans circa 1803 and was known at first as South Pembroke. The town of Darien was founded in 1832 from the south part of the town of Pembroke. The early town was agricultural, supplying food products to nearby urban areas, such as Buffalo.

== Geography ==
According to the United States Census Bureau, the town has a total area of 47.6 square miles (123 km^{2}), of which 47.5 square miles (123 km^{2}) is land and 0.1 square miles (0.26 km^{2}), or 0.13%, is water.

The western town line is the town of Alden in Erie County, and the southern town boundary is the town of Bennington in Wyoming County.

US Route 20 (Broadway) passes across the town and intersects NY-77 at Darien Center. The northern terminus of NY-238 (Attica Road) is in Darien. NY-33 crosses the northwest corner of Darien.

== Demographics ==
Historical population
| Census | Pop. | Note | %± |
|---|---|---|---|
| 1840 | 2,406 | | — |
| 1850 | 2,084 | | −13.4% |
| 1860 | 2,143 | | 2.8% |
| 1870 | 2,054 | | −4.2% |
| 1880 | 2,046 | | −0.4% |
| 1890 | 1,964 | | −4.0% |
| 1900 | 1,887 | | −3.9% |
| 1910 | 1,779 | | −5.7% |
| 1920 | 1,617 | | −9.1% |
| 1930 | 1,740 | | 7.6% |
| 1940 | 1,667 | | −4.2% |
| 1950 | 1,899 | | 13.9% |
| 1960 | 2,357 | | 24.1% |
| 1970 | 2,745 | | 16.5% |
| 1980 | 2,950 | | 7.5% |
| 1990 | 2,979 | | 1.0% |
| 2000 | 3,061 | | 2.8% |
| 2010 | 3,158 | | 3.2% |
| 2020 | 3,010 | | −4.7% |
U.S. Decennial Census

As of the census of 2000, there were 3,061 people, 1,064 households, and 854 families residing in the town. The population density was 64.4 inhabitants per square mile (24.9/km^{2}). There were 1,125 housing units at an average density of 23.7 per square mile (9.2/km^{2}). The racial makeup of the town was 99.12% White, 0.10% African American, 0.29% Native American, 0.03% Asian, and 0.46% from two or more races. Hispanic or Latino of any race were 0.23% of the population.

There were 1,064 households, out of which 37.9% had children under the age of 18 living with them, 69.5% were married couples living together, 5.9% had a female householder with no husband present, and 19.7% were non-families. 15.8% of all households were made up of individuals, and 6.1% had someone living alone who was 65 years of age or older. The average household size was 2.87 and the average family size was 3.20.

In the town, the age distribution of the population shows 29.0% under the age of 18, 6.3% from 18 to 24, 30.5% from 25 to 44, 23.3% from 45 to 64, and 10.8% who were 65 years of age or older. The median age was 37 years. For every 100 females, there were 109.1 males. For every 100 females age 18 and over, there were 102.6 males.

The median income for a household in the town was $48,844, and the median income for a family was $50,844. Males had a median income of $35,000 versus $23,278 for females. The per capita income for the town was $18,372. About 1.8% of families and 3.2% of the population were below the poverty line, including 2.4% of those under age 18 and 3.4% of those age 100 and older

== Notable people ==
- Robert Laben, University of California, Davis professor and namesake of Laben Hall
- Marshal H. Pengra, Wisconsin State Assemblyman
- Al Tharnish, a nineteenth-century foot-racing champion

== Communities and locations ==
- Corfu – A small part of the village of Corfu is in the north part of the town on NY-77.
- Corfu Station – A location south of Corfu village on NY-77.
- Darien, also known as Darien City – A hamlet east of Darien Center at the intersection of Routes NY-20 and NY-238.
- Darien Center – A hamlet east of the state park and south of the theme park, located at Route 20 and Route 77. It was once known as "Kings Corners".
- Darien Lakes State Park – The state park is west of Darien Center on US-20.
- Six Flags Darien Lake – North of Darien Center on NY-77.
- Fargo – A hamlet near the town lines and the state park, located in the northwest corner of the town.
- Griswold – A hamlet south of Darien.
- Lehigh – A hamlet in the northeast corner of the town.
- Longwood – A hamlet on the north town border southeast of Corfu.
- Murder Creek – A tributary of Tonawanda Creek.
- Sawyens – A hamlet east of the theme park.

== See also ==
- Darien Lake Theme Park Resort
