= Alabama, New York =

- Town
- Location of Alabama in Genesee County and New York

- Location of New York in the United States
- Coordinates: 43°05′47″N 78°23′27″W
- Country: United States
- State: New York
- County: Genesee County
- Incorporated: 1826
- Named for: Alabama

Government
  - Supervisor: Robert Crossen Town Council: Jill Klotzbach; Pamela LaGrou; Kevin Fisher; Vacant

Area
  - Total: 42.78 sq mi (110.79 km^{2})
  - Land: 42.37 sq mi (109.74 km^{2})
  - Water: 0.41 sq mi (1.05 km^{2})
- Elevation: 663 ft (202 m)

Population (2020)
  - Total: 1,602
  - Density: 38/sq mi (14.6/km^{2})
- Time zone: UTC-5 (EST)
  - Summer (DST): UTC-4 (EDT)
- ZIP Codes: 14013 (Alabama & Basom); 14001 (Akron); 14036 (Corfu); 14105 (Middleport); 14125 (Oakfield)
- Area code: 585
- FIPS code: 36-037-00474
- Website: alabamany.com

Alabama is a town in Genesee County, New York, United States. The town is in the northwestern part of the county. New York State Routes 63 and 77 intersect in the town. The population was 1,869 at the 2010 census. The town is named after the state of Alabama.

== History ==
French fur trader William Poudrit set up a trading post in what is now the Tonawanda Indian Reservation. A form of his name, "Poodry," is current among the Native Americans. The town was first settled around 1806 in West Alabama. The Town of Alabama was established in 1826 from a part of the Town of Pembroke and the Town of Shelby (Orleans County). The town was originally called the "Town of Gerrysville" after Vice-president Elbridge Gerry. In 1828 the town assumed its current name.

Some of the water from local sour springs, eight in total, was once bottled for medicinal use. A thirty-seven room hotel was erected on the property and named "Spring House". The building burned in 1914. The land is now part of the Iroquois National Wildlife Refuge.

== Geography ==
According to the United States Census Bureau, the town has a total area of 42.8 square miles (111 km^{2}), of which 42.5 square miles (110 km^{2}) is land and 0.2 square miles (0.52 km^{2}) (0.49%) is water.

The Tonawanda Creek flows through the southern part of the town, and Oak Orchard Creek flows through the northern part.

The northern town line is the border of Orleans County and the western town boundary is the border of Erie and Niagara counties.

== Demographics ==
Historical population
| Census | Pop. | Note | %± |
|---|---|---|---|
| 1830 | 783 | | — |
| 1840 | 1,798 | | 129.6% |
| 1850 | 2,054 | | 14.2% |
| 1860 | 2,061 | | 0.3% |
| 1870 | 1,805 | | −12.4% |
| 1880 | 1,975 | | 9.4% |
| 1890 | 1,654 | | −16.3% |
| 1900 | 1,611 | | −2.6% |
| 1910 | 1,797 | | 11.5% |
| 1920 | 1,530 | | −14.9% |
| 1930 | 1,734 | | 13.3% |
| 1940 | 1,763 | | 1.7% |
| 1950 | 1,766 | | 0.2% |
| 1960 | 1,931 | | 9.3% |
| 1970 | 1,872 | | −3.1% |
| 1980 | 1,926 | | 2.9% |
| 1990 | 1,998 | | 3.7% |
| 2000 | 1,881 | | −5.9% |
| 2010 | 1,869 | | −0.6% |
| 2020 | 1,602 | | −14.3% |
U.S. Decennial Census

As of the census of 2000, there were 1,881 people, 663 households, and 483 families residing in the town. The population density was 44.2 inhabitants per square mile (17.1/km^{2}). There were 700 housing units at an average density of 16.5 per square mile (6.4/km^{2}). The racial makeup of the town was 95.16% White, 0.85% African American, 2.23% Native American, 0.21% Asian, 0.11% Pacific Islander, and 1.44% from two or more races. Hispanic or Latino of any race were 0.85% of the population.

There were 663 households, out of which 37.4% had children under the age of 18 living with them, 63.7% were married couples living together, 5.3% had a female householder with no husband present, and 27.1% were non-families. 22.0% of all households were made up of individuals, and 11.2% had someone living alone who was 65 years of age or older. The average household size was 2.84 and the average family size was 3.36.

In the town, the population was spread out, with 30.0% under the age of 18, 7.3% from 18 to 24, 29.8% from 25 to 44, 20.9% from 45 to 64, and 12.0% who were 65 years of age or older. The median age was 35 years. For every 100 females, there were 101.6 males. For every 100 females age 18 and over, there were 100.8 males.

The median income for a household in the town was $40,223, and the median income for a family was $45,947. Males had a median income of $32,454 versus $23,456 for females. The per capita income for the town was $14,811. About 4.7% of families and 6.3% of the population were below the poverty line, including 5.9% of those under age 18 and 7.2% of those age 65 or over.

== Notable people ==
- Charles Dinsmoor, inventor, born in Alabama Center
- John Rankin Gamble, former US Congressman from Dakota Territory

== Communities and locations in the Town of Alabama ==
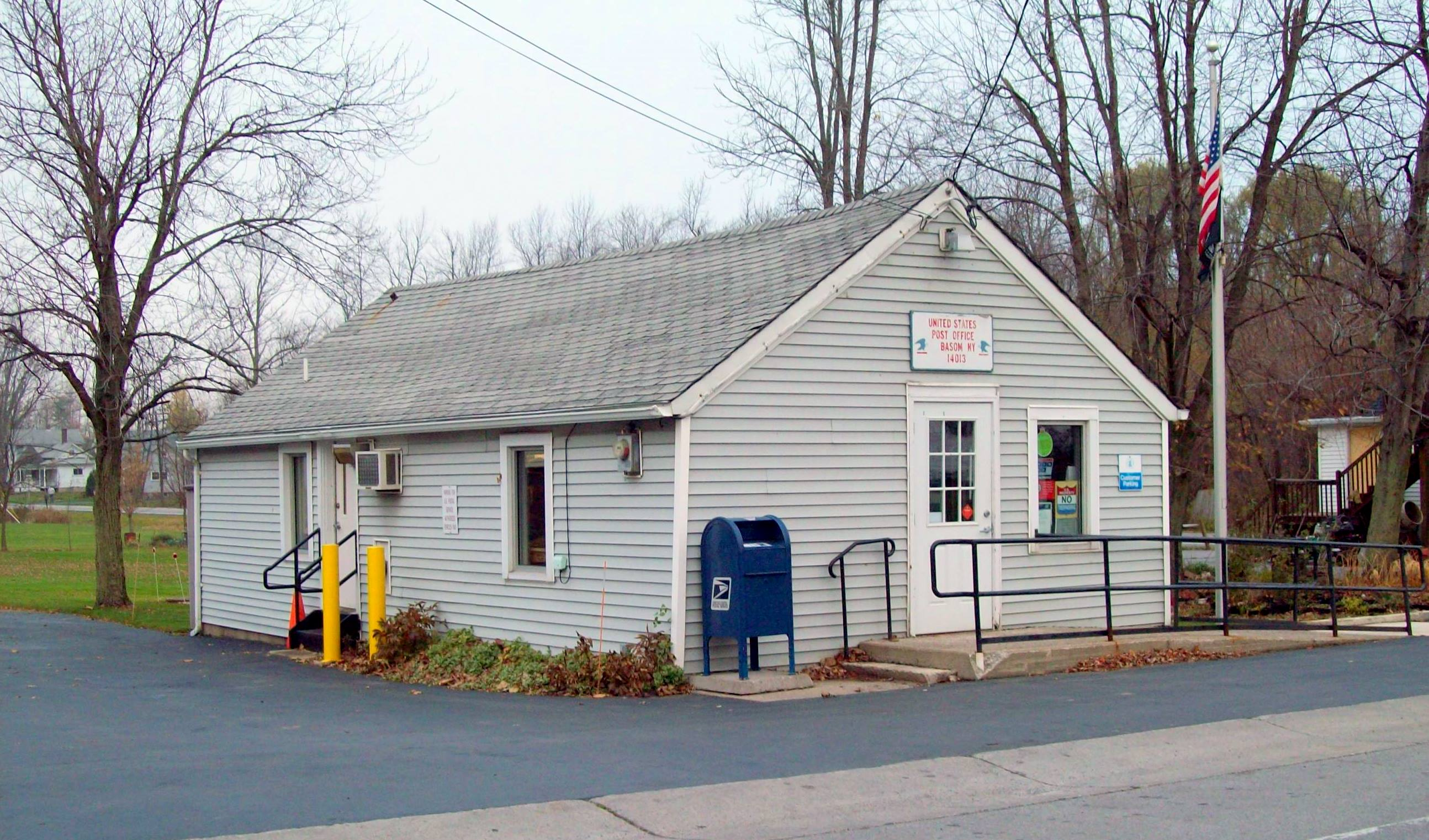
United States Post Office in Basom in November 2010

- Alabama (or Alabama Center) – The hamlet of Alabama is centered on the crossroad of Routes 63 and 77, where there is a restaurant on one corner and a small market on another.
- Basom – This hamlet is on NY-77 where Bloomingdale Road runs off to the west. This community had a railroad station at one time. It was named after an Alabama town supervisor.
- Indian Falls (formerly "Tonawanda Falls") – A hamlet at the south town line on NY-77. Tonawanda Creek flows through the community and has a spectacular waterfall. Above the falls are rapids which were a source of water power in the early days of the community.
- Iroquois National Wildlife Refuge – A federal refuge is partly in the northern part of the town.
- Meadeville – A hamlet inside the Tonawanda Wildlife Management Area, located on Meadeville Road, south of NY-77.
- Oak Orchard Wildlife Management Area - A conservation area partially in the northern part of the town.
- South Alabama – A hamlet on NY-63, near the Oakfield border and south of Wheatville. The community was formerly called "Smithville."
- Tonawanda Reservation of the Seneca tribe - A part of the reservation is inside the west border of the town. Bloomingdale Road passes through the reservation, connecting Basom and Akron.
- Tonawanda Wildlife Management Area – A New York state conservation area, partially in the northern part of the town.
- The Alabama Hotel, located at the intersection of 63 and 77, where Spiro Agnew was quoted as saying, after stopping during a campaign swing in 1968, "Really fine wings they have.... really fine"
- West Alabama – A former hamlet, now a location in the northwest corner of the town on NY-77.
- Wheatville – A hamlet east of Alabama hamlet by the intersection of Knowlesville and Lockport Roads.
- Wheatville Station – A location south of South Alabama.
- White Memorial Game Farm – A former game farm located south of Alabama hamlet on NY-77. Used primarily for raising pheasants, it has been given over to other recreational use.
