= Pembroke, New York =

Pembroke, New York Seneca: Oà:’geh
- Town
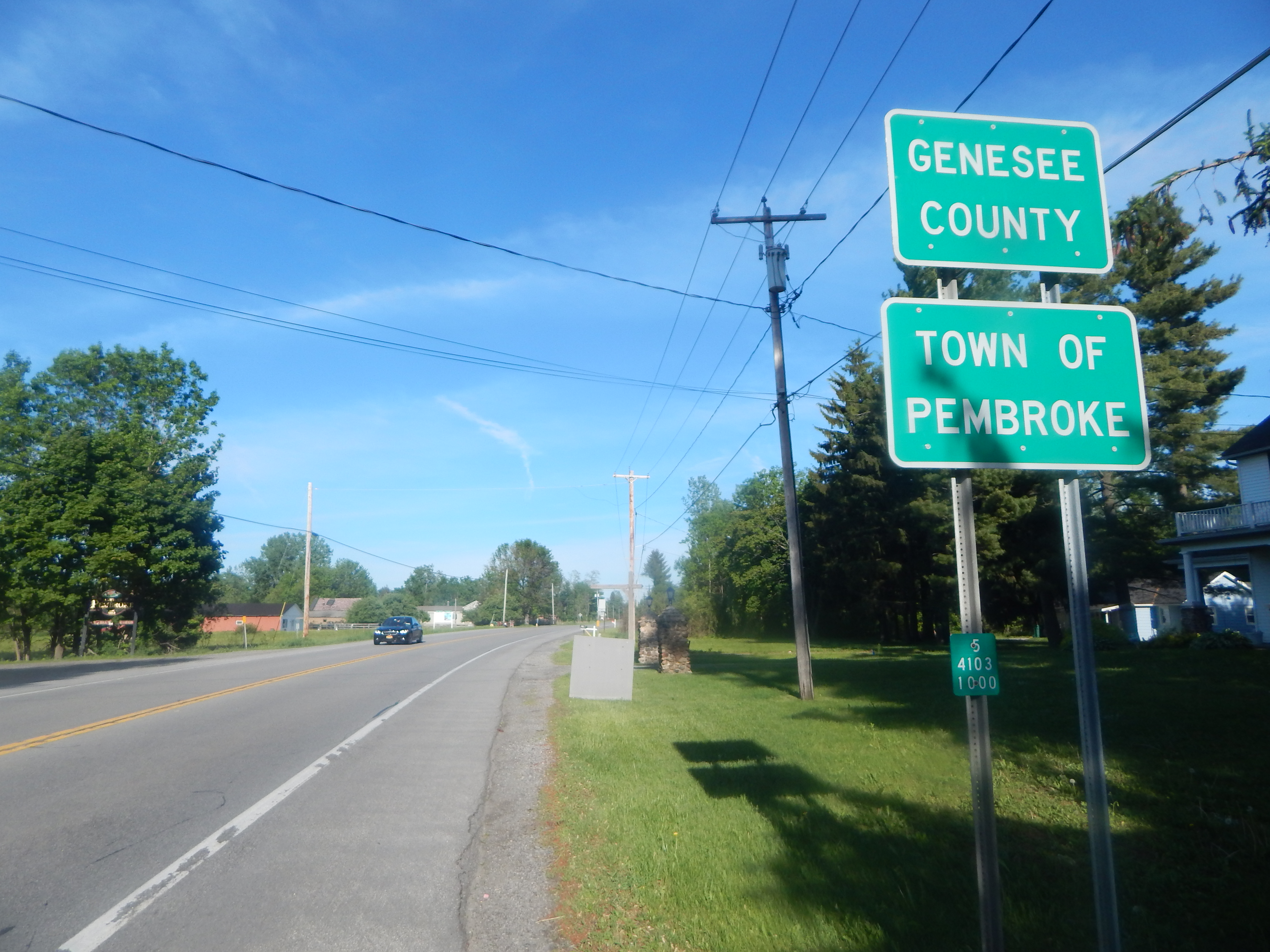
- Route 5 entering the town of Pembroke

- Location in Genesee County and the state of New York
- Coordinates: 42°59′12″N 78°23′25″W
- Country: United States
- State: New York
- County: Genesee

Government
  - Type: Town Council
  - Town Supervisor: James H. Tuttle
  - Town Council: Members' List: • Edward G. Arnold, Jr.; • Gary L. DeWind; • Peter G. Sformo; • John Worth

Area
  - Total: 41.72 sq mi (108.05 km^{2})
  - Land: 41.63 sq mi (107.81 km^{2})
  - Water: 0.089 sq mi (0.23 km^{2})
- Elevation: 850 ft (260 m)

Population (2010)
  - Total: 4,292
  - Estimate (2016): 4,240
  - Density: 101.9/sq mi (39.33/km^{2})
- Time zone: UTC-5 (Eastern (EST))
  - Summer (DST): UTC-4 (EDT)
- ZIP Codes: 14036 (Corfu); 14001 (Akron); 14013 (Basom); 14020 (Batavia); 14056 (East Pembroke)
- Area code: 585
- FIPS code: 36-037-57078
- GNIS feature ID: 0979350
- Website: Town of Pembroke

Pembroke (Seneca: Oà:’geh) is a town in Genesee County, Western New York, United States. The population was 4,292 at the 2010 census. The town is named after a town in west Wales. Pembroke lies on the west border of Genesee County, west of Batavia.

== History ==
Pembroke was first settled in 1804 by David Goss.

Pembroke was established from part of the town of Batavia in 1812.

== Geography ==
According to the United States Census Bureau, the town has a total area of 41.7 square miles (108 km^{2}), of which 41.7 square miles (108 km^{2}) is land and 0.02% is water.

The New York State Thruway (Interstate 90) passes through Pembroke, and New York State Route 5 intersects New York State Route 77 in the town.

Tonawanda Creek and its tributary Murder Creek flow through the town.

The west town line is the border of Erie County.

=== Adjacent cities and towns ===
- Erie County, Town of Alden - west
- Erie County, Town of Newstead - west
- Town of Alabama - north
- Town of Oakfield - northeast
- Town of Batavia - east
- Town of Alexander - southeast
- Town of Darien - south
- Village of Corfu- lies at south part of town bordering Town of Darien

=== Major highways in the town of Pembroke ===
- Interstate 90 (New York State Thruway), runs east–west through the town from Newstead to Batavia. There is a service area on the Thruway (eastbound) named for Pembroke.
- New York State Route 5 (Main St.), east–west highway that passes through the center of town from Newstead to Batavia.
- New York State Route 33 (Genesee St.), east–west highway through the town from the Darien town line to the Batavia town line.
- New York State Route 77 (Alleghany Rd.), north–south highway that runs through the center of town from Corfu to Alabama.

=== Notable places ===
The Western New York National Cemetery is located in Pembroke. As of 2016, the first burial is expected to take place by the end of the decade.

== Demographics ==
Historical population
Census	Pop.	Note	%±
1820	2,576		—
1830	3,831		48.7%
1840	1,970		−48.6%
1850	2,279		15.7%
1860	2,855		25.3%
1870	2,810		−1.6%
1880	2,845		1.2%
1890	2,679		−5.8%
1900	2,425		−9.5%
1910	2,301		−5.1%
1920	2,202		−4.3%
1930	2,209		0.3%
1940	2,391		8.2%
1950	2,866		19.9%
1960	3,451		20.4%
1970	3,959		14.7%
1980	4,146		4.7%
1990	4,232		2.1%
2000	4,530		7.0%
2010	4,292		−5.3%
2016 (est.)	4,240		−1.2%
U.S. Decennial Census

As of the census of 2000, there were 4,530 people, 1,660 households, and 1,228 families residing in the town. The population density was 108.6 inhabitants per square mile (41.9/km^{2}). There were 1,776 housing units at an average density of 42.6 per square mile (16.4/km^{2}). The racial makeup of the town was 98.12% White, 0.38% African American, 0.35% Native American, 0.15% Asian, 0.13% from other races, and 0.86% from two or more races. Hispanic or Latino of any race were 0.68% of the population.

There were 1,660 households, out of which 36.2% had children under the age of 18 living with them, 61.3% were married couples living together, 8.9% had a female householder with no husband present, and 26.0% were non-families. 19.8% of all households were made up of individuals, and 8.8% had someone living alone who was 65 years of age or older. The average household size was 2.73 and the average family size was 3.16.

In the town, the population was spread out, with 27.9% under the age of 18, 6.7% from 18 to 24, 30.2% from 25 to 44, 22.8% from 45 to 64, and 12.5% who were 65 years of age or older. The median age was 37 years. For every 100 females, there were 96.2 males. For every 100 females age 18 and over, there were 95.6 males.

The median income for a household in the town was $41,266, and the median income for a family was $46,495. Males had a median income of $32,487 versus $25,046 for females. The per capita income for the town was $17,148. About 2.6% of families and 4.8% of the population were below the poverty line, including 4.5% of those under age 18 and 4.7% of those age 65 or over.

== Communities and locations in Pembroke ==
- Brick House Corners – A hamlet at the intersection of NY-5 and NY-77. Toll plaza 48A of the New York Thruway is located north of the intersection.
- Cookville – A location now marked by the Pembroke service area on the New York State Thruway in the east part of the town.
- Corfu – The village of Corfu lies on the south border of the town. Initially called "Long's Corners", the village is at the intersection of NY-33 and NY-77.
- East Pembroke – A hamlet on NY-5, is located between Pembroke Center and Batavia.
- Indian Falls – This hamlet, located by a waterfall on Tonawanda Creek, is the birthplace of Ely S. Parker. NY-77 passes through the community.
- North Pembroke – A hamlet on Tonawanda Creek in the northeast corner of the town.
- Pembroke – A hamlet on NY-5 near the border with Erie County. In its early days it was called "Richville", and is now composed of houses and commercial buildings (some closed) scattered along Main Street. The only intersection is where Lake Road crosses. Two small factories on the east end of the village are dairy-related. One is Kutters Cheese Factory.
- Pembroke Center – A location on NY-5 between Pembroke and East Pembroke. It is also called "Frog Hollow", where the first settler David Goss built the Old White Tavern, the first public house in the township.
