= New York State Route 77 =

State highway in western New York, US

New York State Route 77
- Map of western New York with NY 77 highlighted in red

Route information
- Maintained by NYSDOT and Genesee County
- Length: 46.28 mi (74.48 km)
- Existed: 1930–present

Major junctions
- South end: NY 78 / NY 98 in Java
- US 20A in Sheldon; US 20 in Darien I-90 Toll / New York Thruway in Pembroke
- North end: NY 31 in Lockport

Location
- Country: United States
- State: New York
- Counties: Wyoming, Genesee, Niagara

Highway system
- New York Highways; Interstate; US; State; Reference; Parkways
← NY 76	→ NY 77A

New York State Route 77 (NY 77) is a north–south state highway in the western part of New York in the United States. The highway runs for 46.28 miles (74.48 km) across mostly rural areas from an intersection with NY 78 and NY 98 in the Wyoming County town of Java to a junction with NY 31 near the city of Lockport in Niagara County. It connects to several of the region's major east–west roads, including U.S. Route 20 (US 20) and the New York State Thruway (Interstate 90 or I-90). In southwestern Genesee County, the route takes on added importance as it provides the most direct route between the Thruway and Darien Lake, Western New York's largest amusement park.

The route was assigned as part of the 1930 renumbering of state highways in New York to the portion of its modern routing north of US 20A. Over the next 30 years, NY 77 was truncated and extended several times, moving the south end of the route to various locations in Wyoming and Genesee counties. Throughout this time, NY 77 always extended at least as far south as Corfu. It arrived at its current alignment c. 1961.

== Route description ==
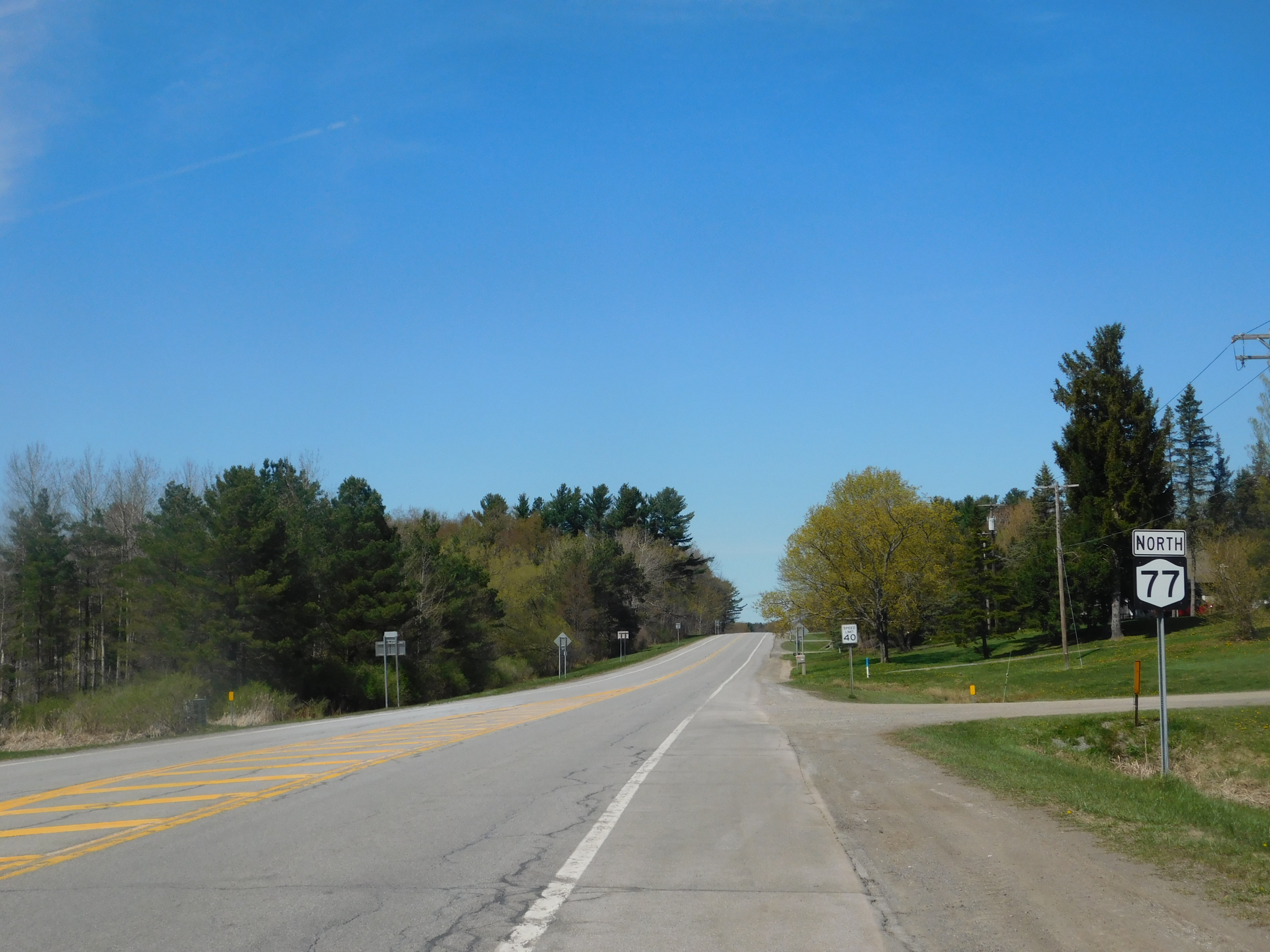
NY 77 north from NY 78/NY 98 in Java Center

NY 77 begins at a somewhat complicated four-way intersection with NY 78 and NY 98 in Java Center, a hamlet within the Wyoming County town of Java. Here, NY 78 heads east–west through the junction while NY 98 enters the intersection from the south and turns to follow NY 78 east toward an area known as Five Corners. NY 77, meanwhile, continues due north on the path set by NY 98 south of this point. The highway gradually descends through the open fields of Wyoming County, loosely paralleling the Arcade and Attica Railroad for 4 miles (6 km) to the railroad's end outside of North Java. Past this point, NY 77 heads into the town of Sheldon, where it crosses US 20A near the northern town line. In the adjacent town of Bennington, the route serves the small hamlet of the same name, situated around NY 77's junction with NY 354.

North of Bennington hamlet, the highway traverses some swampy areas on its way into Genesee County, where it crosses the Norfolk Southern Railway's Southern Tier Line at a grade crossing just south of the Darien hamlet of Darien Center. In the small community, located southeast of Darien Lakes State Park, NY 77 intersects the cross-state US 20. Not far to the north of Darien Center is Darien Lake, a sprawling amusement park located on the east side of the highway. The road, however, remains a two-lane highway as it continues north to the town of Pembroke and the village of Corfu, where it intersects NY 33. NY 77 crosses another major east–west route, NY 5, at a junction 2 miles (3.2 km) north of Corfu known locally as Brick House Corners.

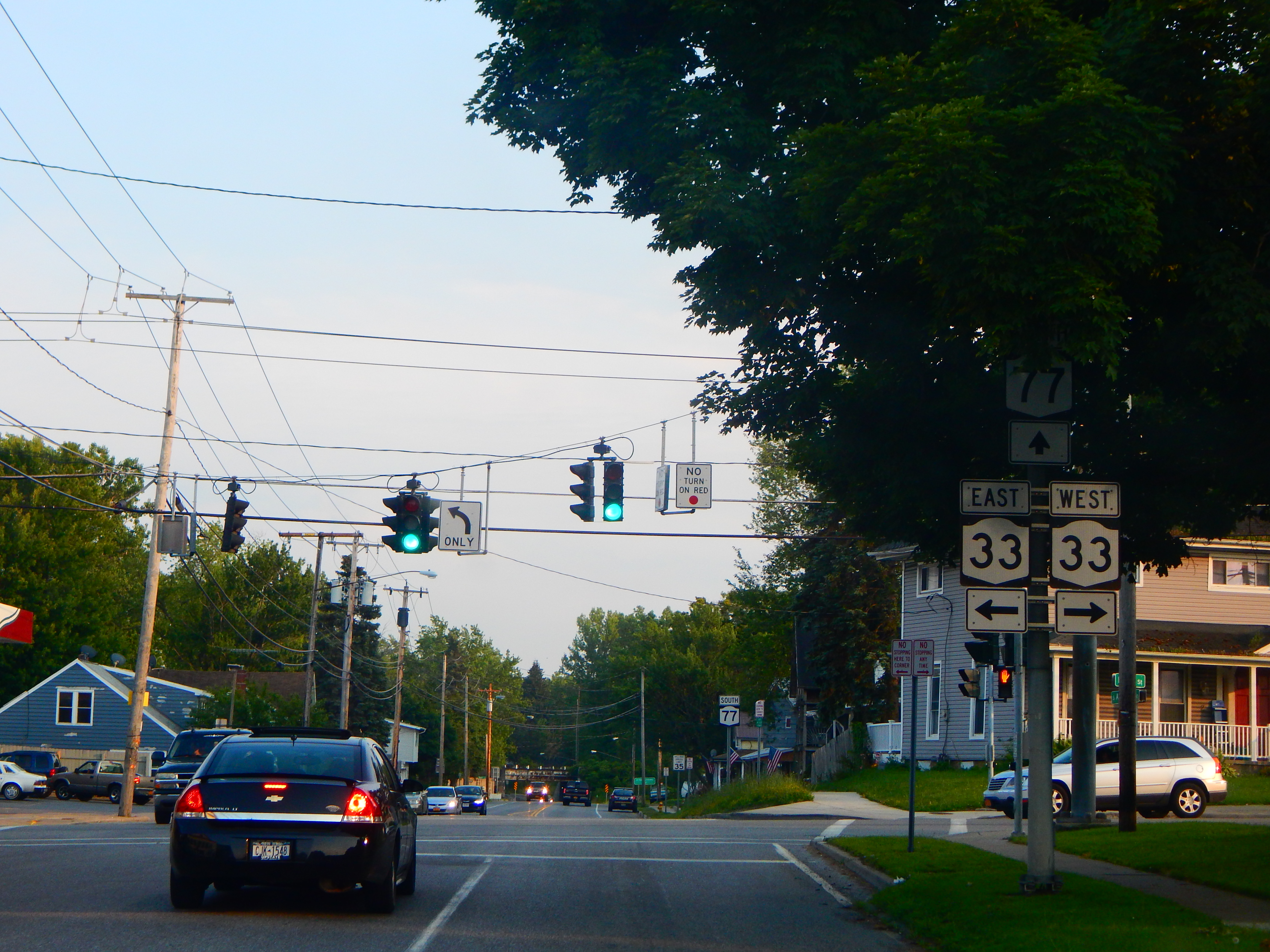
NY 77 southbound at the junction with NY 33 in Corfu

Just beyond that junction, the truck stops and toll plaza associated with exit 48A of the New York State Thruway (I-90) come into view as the road dips slightly in elevation. After connecting to the Thruway's toll plaza, the highway makes its first major bend, turning northeast to pass over the Thruway. Past the Thruway, it once again continues in a more northerly fashion to the hamlet of Indian Falls, a community located on the northern bank of the Tonawanda Creek. NY 77 crosses the creek here, and the falls that give the hamlet its name are visible from the road. North of the falls, the surrounding land becomes mostly fields once again as the route resumes a due north alignment into the town of Alabama. At the small hamlet of Basom, NY 77 intersects Bloomingdale Road, a local road serving the nearby Tonawanda Indian Reservation that was once part of NY 267.

Not far from Basom, NY 63 comes in from the east and turns north onto NY 77, starting the only concurrency along the latter route. This ends 1.5 miles (2.4 km) further north in the hamlet of Alabama, where NY 77 turns to the west as NY 63 takes over the northbound route. The portion of NY 77 from NY 63 to the Niagara County line is maintained by Genesee County as part of CR 12, which continues east of NY 63 along Lewiston, Lockport and North Byron Roads to CR 7 northeast of the village of Elba. This section of NY 77 is the only part that is not maintained by the New York State Department of Transportation (NYSDOT).

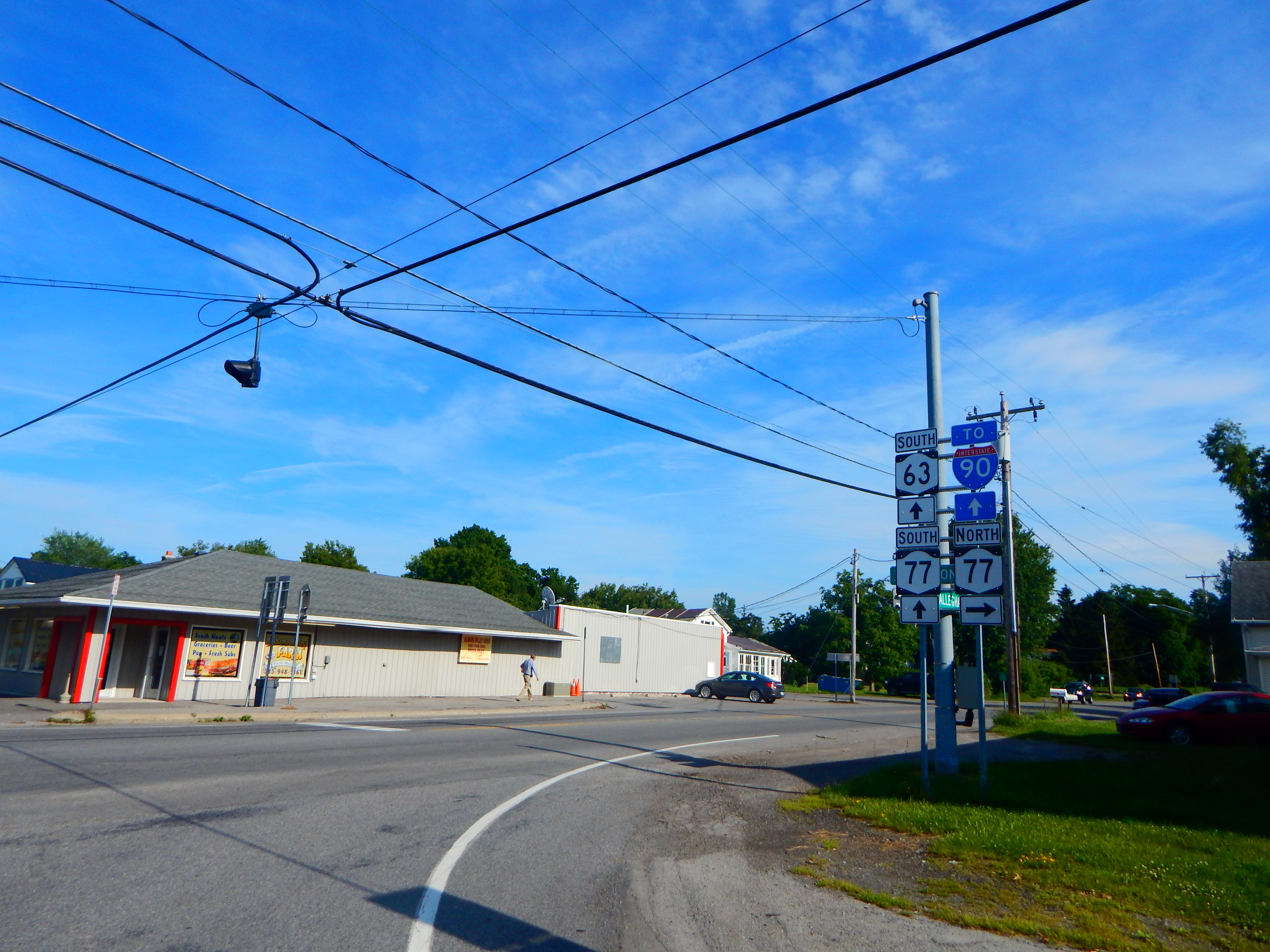
NY 77 at the junction with NY 63 in Alabama

West of NY 63, NY 77 follows Lewiston Road northwest along the southwestern edge of Oak Orchard Swamp and the Iroquois National Wildlife Refuge. As it heads into Niagara County, NY 77 continues to trend slightly northward, running along the northern fringe of the Tonawanda Wildlife Management Area. About 6 miles (10 km) northwest of the county line is the hamlet of McNalls, which served as the southern terminus of the 1930s incarnation of NY 359. The route continues on to the eastern suburbs of the city of Lockport, where NY 77 ends at an intersection with NY 31 near the community of Nottingham Estates.

== History ==
The northernmost 3.5 miles (5.6 km) of modern NY 77 between Gasport Road at McNalls and what is now NY 31 east of Lockport was originally designated as part of a spur of Route 30, an unsigned legislative route, by the New York State Legislature in 1914. On March 1, 1921, the spur became part of an extended Route 20. When the first set of posted routes in New York were assigned in 1924, all of legislative Route 20 west of Rochester was designated as part of NY 3. In the 1930 renumbering of state highways in New York, NY 3 was realigned between Lockport and Gasport to follow modern NY 31. Its former routing from Lockport to McNalls became part of NY 77, a new route assigned in the renumbering that began at US 20 (now US 20A) in Sheldon and passed through Corfu, Alabama, and McNalls on its way to NY 3 in Lockport.

NY 77 was extended south to Arcade c. 1933, following its modern alignment to Java Center and overlapping with NY 98 (via Chaffee and Curriers Roads, both part of NY 98 at the time) between Java Center and Arcade. The extension was short-lived, however, as NY 77 was truncated northward to NY 33 in Corfu c. 1939. Around the same time, NY 98 was realigned to use East Arcade Road between Arcade and NY 78 in Java. NY 77 was reextended southward to Java Center in the late 1950s and along modern NY 98 to the junction of Cattaraugus and East Arcade Roads (the latter then part of NY 98) near Arcade c. 1961. NY 98 was realigned in the early 1960s to follow NY 77 between Arcade and Java Center, resulting in the truncation of NY 77 back to Java Center once again.

== NY 77A ==
NY 77A was a spur of NY 77 in the vicinity of Basom in Genesee County. It was assigned c. 1935 and supplanted by an extended NY 267 in the late 1930s.

== Major intersections ==
County	Location	mi	km	Destinations	Notes
Wyoming	Java	0.00	0.00	NY 78 / NY 98	Southern terminus; hamlet of Java Center
Wyoming	Sheldon	8.32	13.39	US 20A – East Aurora, Warsaw	Hamlet of Persons Corners
Wyoming	Bennington	13.10	21.08	NY 354 – Attica, Cowlesville	Hamlet of Bennington
Genesee	Darien	17.57	28.28	US 20 – Avon, Alden, Buffalo	Hamlet of Darien Center
Genesee	Corfu	21.79	35.07	NY 33 (Main Street)	
Genesee	Pembroke	24.06	38.72	NY 5 – Buffalo, Akron, Batavia	
Genesee	Pembroke	24.76	39.85	I-90 Toll / New York Thruway – Buffalo, Albany	Exit 48A (I-90 / Thruway)
Genesee	Alabama	29.82	47.99	NY 63 south – Oakfield, Batavia	Southern terminus of NY 63 / NY 77 overlap
Genesee	Alabama	31.31	50.39	NY 63 north – Medina	Northern terminus of NY 63 / NY 77 overlap; hamlet of Alabama
Niagara	Town of Lockport	46.28	74.48	NY 31	Northern terminus
1.000 mi = 1.609 km; 1.000 km = 0.621 mi: Concurrency terminus; Electronic toll collection
