= Varysburg, New York =

Varysburg
- Hamlet
- Location within New York
- Coordinates: 42°44′45.37″N 78°19′0.3″W
- Founder: William L. Varys

Varysburg is a hamlet located at the intersection of U.S. Route 20A and New York State Route 98. It is in the eastern portion of the town of Sheldon close to the border with Orangeville in Wyoming County, New York, United States. As per the 2010 census the population of the Varysburg ZIP Code area (14167), which included part of the town of Orangeville, was 1,646.

== History ==
Nestled in the middle of a valley formed by the Tonawanda Creek, Varysburg was settled by William L. Vary in 1805 after purchasing the land from the Holland Land Company. William, and his extended family from Stephentown, settled the territory and hired pioneers to construct a sawmill and gristmill.

Vary, who suffered a head injury in a logging accident in 1807, was named a Colonel during the War of 1812 leading a regiment sized force and was gifted a cane from Commodore Oliver Hazard Perry made out of the main mast of the USS Lawrence for his commendable service. Due to his tenure in the war, Varys became a local celebrity and opened his family farm to other settlers upon his return in 1815 which saw the settlement be incorporated as a village. Most if not all of the original settlers of the village where Baptists and formed the Free Will Baptist Church in 1816. They would be joined by a Methodist Episcopal Church in 1836. In 1885 Vary moved to the William L. Vary House in Livingston County.

One of the original families to move into Varysburg after its opening by Varys was the Richards family. The patriarch of the family, Daniel Richards, was a 20-year veteran in various Vermont militias that served during the American Revolutionary War from 1777 to 1782, and moved with the family, dying in the town in 1825. On October 15, 2016, the Richards, after lobbying since 1984, unveiled a New York State Historical Marker for Daniel Richards in a ceremony with a 21 gun salute from members of the Wyoming County Joint Veterans Honor Guard dressed in Revolutionary War uniforms.

Starting in 1833, Varysburg, now numbering some 20 houses, came to be dominated by the Davis and Madden families who turned the village into a manufacturing hub opening Carding, Cloth, and timber mills powered by the Tonawanda Creek. Additionally, the Baptists constructed the first church in 1836, previously meeting on a rotational basis in people's homes. In 1848 the village had its first ever murder, when John Shadbolt murdered his wife Ceonies. During the trial which took place in the Wyoming County Courthouse most of the village's adult population, some 400 to 500 individuals, attended the proceedings. The village's mills specialized in the production of shoepegs, but after a fire burned down the cloth mill in 1858, a cheese factory would be built to replace it in 1861, dominating the village's economy.

The opening of the cheese factory marked the beginning of the village's golden age, as the factory brought great profits to the families living in Varysburg. By 1885 there would be eight factories in Varysburg, and a number of lumber mills. In 1882 the Freemasons opened a chapter in Varysburg and a number of stores were constructed. However, in 1895 the cheese factory burned down, and by 1899 Edward Madden, the longtime owner of the "Madden Mills" and factories, would die, marking an end to the industrial prominence of the village.

In 1906 the Freemasons sold their temple to the Independent Order of Odd Fellows whose Lodge No. 418 continue to operate in the building until at least the 1980s. Additionally, in 1905 the village had a telephone switchboard constructed by the Bell Telephone Company. In 1908 a large fire of unknown origins burned down the western half of the village, including the village's only hotel, the Lower Hotel, and general store, the Wolf Brothers Store. Although efforts were made to rebuild the village, including the construction of the first library and garage selling ford Model-Ts in 1909, after the economic collapse from the shuttering of the factories, most residents chose to move elsewhere.

By 1910 most of the village was abandoned and ran the risk of becoming a ghost town until brothers Charles and John Hartung used the old buildings as an apple evaporator and bunkhouses for their employees. In 1912 the first Catholic mass was celebrated in Varysburg and a church constructed, as well as the printing of the first edition of the village's first ever newspaper, the Sheldon Democrat, which would operate until its building burned in 1921 and was sold and moved to Warsaw. In 1928 another fire broke out, this one in one of the abandoned factories, and ripped through the largely abandoned village. Most remaining buildings were destroyed and the fire was thought to have been an act of arson by George C. Mason a banker in Webster who had secretly purchased the factories just a month prior, and put in a hefty insurance premium.
