= 1927 renumbering =

1927 renumbering may refer to:

- 1927 New Jersey state highway renumbering
- 1927 Ohio state highway renumbering
- 1927 state highway renumbering (New York)
