= New York State Route 267 =

Former state highway in New York State

New York State Route 267
- Map of the Buffalo area with NY 267 highlighted in red

Route information
- Maintained by NYSDOT, the Tonawanda Band of Seneca Indians, and the town of Alabama
- Length: 7.1 mi (11.4 km)
- Existed: c. 1935–August 14, 1980

Major junctions
- West end: NY 93 in Akron
- East end: NY 77 in Alabama

Location
- Country: United States
- State: New York
- Counties: Erie, Genesee

Highway system
- New York Highways; Interstate; US; State; Reference; Parkways
← NY 266	→ NY 268
← NY 77	NY 77A	→ I-78

New York State Route 267 (NY 267) was an east–west state highway in the western portion of New York in the United States. It extended for 7.16 miles (11.52 km) from an intersection with NY 93 in the Erie County village of Akron to a junction with NY 77 in the Genesee County hamlet of Basom. Part of NY 267 in Genesee County passed through the Tonawanda Indian Reservation. The portion of NY 267 within Erie County was assigned c. 1935. NY 267 was extended east to NY 77 in Basom in the late 1930s, replacing New York State Route 77A, a spur leading from NY 77 to the eastern edge of the Tonawanda Reservation. The Erie County segment of the route was transferred from the state of New York to Erie County in April 1980, leading to the total removal of the NY 267 designation in August of that year.

== Route description ==
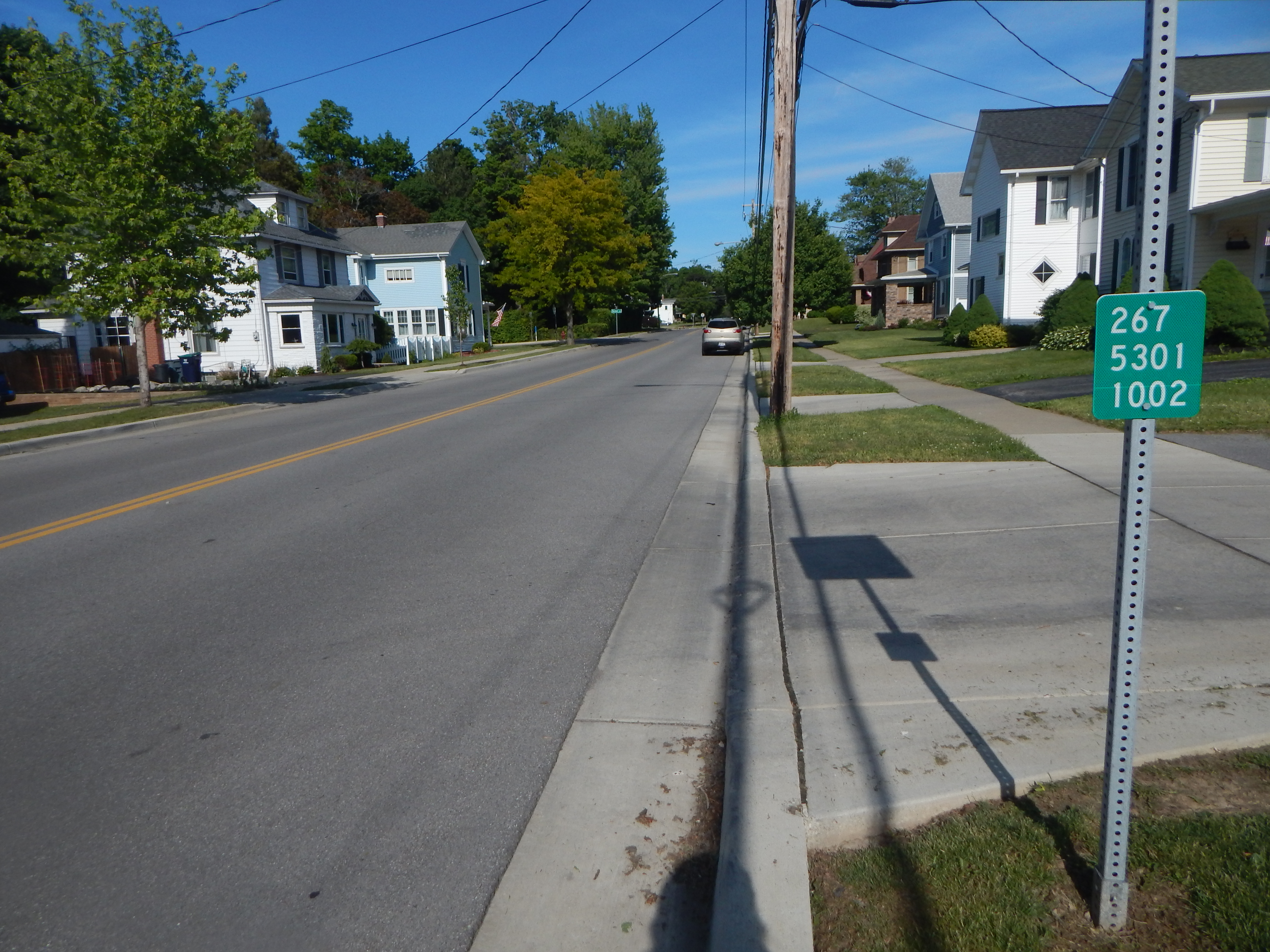
NY 267 reference marker along John Street in Akron

NY 267 began at an intersection with NY 93 in the village of Akron in eastern Erie County. The route headed eastward, following John Street through downtown Akron. NY 267 broke from John Street just four blocks later. While the street continued east to serve Akron Airport, the route turned northeast to follow Bloomingdale Road out of the village. The route continued through gradually less developed areas of the town of Newstead, intersecting with County Route 250 (CR 250, named Scotland Road). NY 267 crossed into Genesee County soon afterward.

In the Genesee County town of Alabama, NY 267 made a slight turn to the north as it entered the Tonawanda Indian Reservation. Once inside the reservation, the route remained on a north-northeasterly alignment for about 0.5 miles (0.8 km) to a junction with Parker Road. At this point, the highway turned to the east, progressing across the reservation. At an intersection with Reuben Road 1.25 miles (2.01 km) later, NY 267 turned to the north for another 0.5 miles (0.8 km) before it exited the reservation. The route continued for roughly 1 mile (1.6 km) to the hamlet of Basom, where it terminated at an intersection with NY 77.

== History ==
New York State Route 77A
- Location: Tonawanda Indian Reservation–Alabama
- Existed: c. 1935–late 1930s

NY 267 was assigned c. 1935 to a routing extending from NY 93 in Akron to the Erie–Genesee county line by way of John Street and Bloomingdale Road. Farther east, the portion of Bloomingdale Road between the Tonawanda Indian Reservation and NY 77 was designated as NY 77A around the same time. NY 77A and the remainder of Bloomingdale Road within Genesee County became an extension of NY 267 in the late 1930s. On April 1, 1980, ownership and maintenance of the portion of NY 267 within Erie County—by this point the lone state-maintained portion of the route—was transferred from the state of New York to Erie County as part of a highway maintenance swap between the two levels of government. The NY 267 designation was removed from the entirety of its routing just over four months later on August 14, 1980. The Erie County segment of the route is now CR 573 while the Genesee County section is locally maintained.

== Major intersections ==
County	Location	mi	km	Destinations	Notes
Erie	Akron	0.0	0.0	NY 93	
Genesee	Alabama	7.1	11.4	NY 77 (Allegany Road)	Hamlet of Basom
1.000 mi = 1.609 km; 1.000 km = 0.621 mi

== See also ==
- List of county routes in Erie County, New York (545–580)
