= Indian Falls =

Indian Falls may refer to:

- Indian Falls, California
- Indian Falls, New York
