= Western New York National Cemetery =

Pending veterans cemetery in Genesee County, New York

- Interactive map of Western New York National Cemetery

Details
- Established: 2016
- Location: Pembroke, New York
- Country: United States
- Coordinates: 43.0171263°N 78.401722°W
- Type: Public
- Owned by: United States Department of Veterans Affairs
- Size: 132 acres (53 ha)
- No. of graves: 3608
- Find a Grave: https://www.findagrave.com/cemetery/2642356/western-new-york-national-cemetery

The Western New York National Cemetery is a new United States National Cemetery located in the Town of Pembroke in Genesee County, approximately 30 miles (48 km) east of Buffalo and 45 miles (72 km) west of Rochester in New York, United States. The cemetery's street address is in Corfu but the property is actually located in the town of Pembroke. It encompasses 132 acres (53 ha) and is the seventh National Cemetery operated by the United States Department of Veterans Affairs in the New York. It is expected to have room for the burial of over 96,000 veterans and be open for 70 years. The cemetery is located near exit 48A of the New York State Thruway.

== History ==
The VA purchased the property in May 2014 for $625,000. Initial development is planned for 70 acres (28 ha) to provide approximately 10 years of capacity for burials of both casketed and cremated remains. The location provides a burial option much closer to the Western New York population centers than the Bath National Cemetery in Steuben County. Prior to the creation of the cemetery, the Western New York area had the largest veterans population without a nearby veterans cemetery. The cemetery was selected as a result of a 2011 VA policy intended to provide national cemeteries close to all population centers. The Fiscal Year 2017 Military Construction and Veterans Affairs Appropriations Bill included $36 million for cemetery construction which will allow construction to begin in 2017.

== Naming ==
The permanent name for the cemetery, based upon geographic location, was announced in May 2016. US Senator Charles Schumer proposed the cemetery be named after a local war hero William J. Donovan. The policy of the VA is that National cemeteries be named based on the geographic area in which the cemetery is located.

== Facilities ==
Development will include roads, landscaping, administration and maintenance buildings, a public information center, and restrooms. Cremated remains will be interred in marble columbariums. Design is planned to be completed in 2016, and construction of the first 60-acre (24 ha) section is expected to take three years. Construction of subsequent phases will occur when additional burial space is required.
