= Harry Jeremiah Parks =

American Civil War Medal of Honor recipient

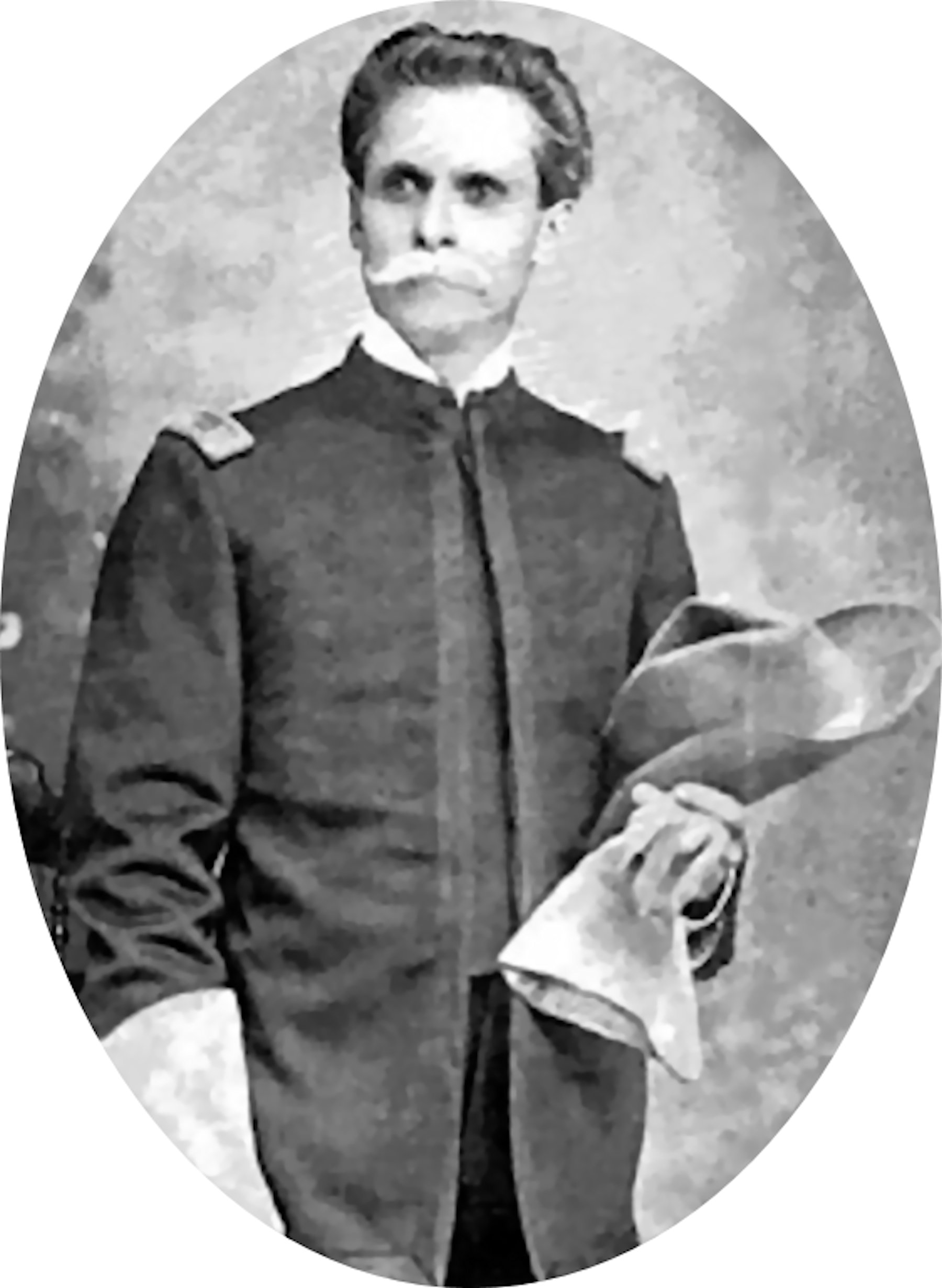
- Parks, c. 1898
- Born: February 24, 1848; Orangeville, New York, US
- Died: October 19, 1927 (aged 79)
- Burial place: Arlington National Cemetery
- Military career
- Allegiance: United States of America; Union
- Branch: United States Army; Union Army
- Rank: Captain
- Units: 9th New York Cavalry; 1st Colorado Light Artillery
- Conflicts: American Civil War; *Battle of Cedar Creek; Spanish–American War
- Awards: Medal of Honor

Harry Jeremiah Parks (February 24, 1848 – October 19, 1927) was a United States Army soldier and a recipient of the United States military highest decoration—the Medal of Honor—for his actions in the American Civil War.

== Life and career ==
Harry Jeremiah Parks, a farm boy from Orangeville, New York, Parks ran away from home twice to join the Union Army. He signed his name as Jeremiah Parks, using his middle name to escape from his father James Parks who had brought him back once before. He mustered in at Lockport, New York, shortly before his 16th birthday and was assigned as a private to Company A of the 9th New York Cavalry. Serving under General Philip Sheridan, Parks rode into battle on October 19, 1864, at Cedar Creek, Virginia, capturing the "Bonnie Blue Flag" and several prisoners. He was awarded the Medal of Honor for his actions a week later, on October 26, 1864. At age sixteen, Parks is one of the youngest recipients of the medal.

Medal of Honor

Parks again served during the Spanish–American War, rising to the rank of captain and serving with Battery A of the 1st Colorado Light Artillery. He died at age 79 and was buried in Arlington National Cemetery, Arlington County, Virginia.

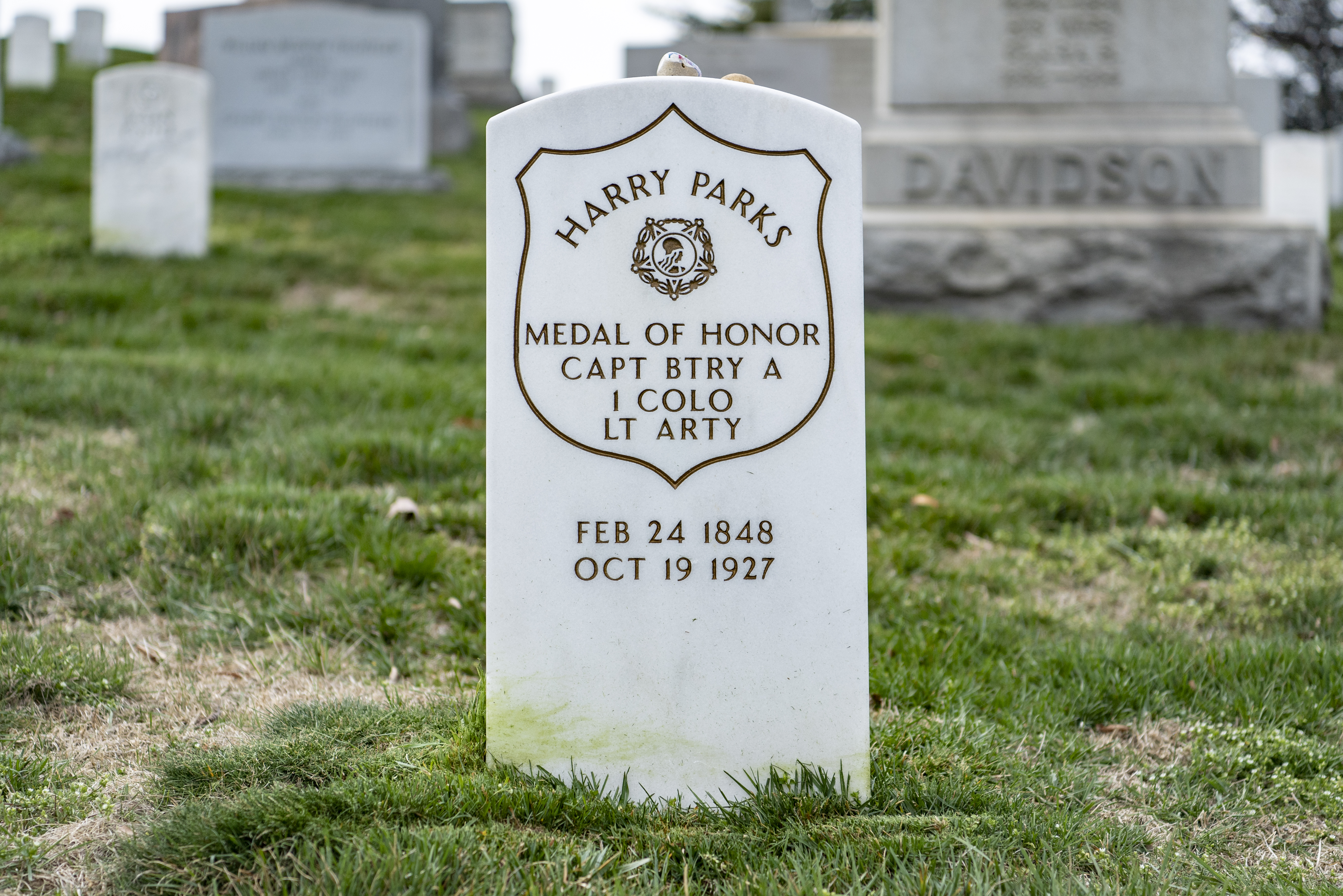
Grave at Arlington National Cemetery

== Medal of Honor citation ==
Rank and Organization:

Private, Company A, 9th New York Cavalry. Place and Date: At Cedar Creek, Va., October 19, 1864. Entered Service At: Orangeville, N.Y. Born: February 24, 1848, Orangeville, N.Y. Date of Issue: October 26, 1864.

Citation:

While alone and in advance of his unit and attempting to cut off the retreat of a supply wagon, he fought and sent to flight a Confederate color bearer. After capturing the color bearer and leaving him in the rear, he returned to the front and captured 3 more wagons and drivers.

== See also ==
- List of American Civil War Medal of Honor recipients: M–P
