= James D. Yeomans =

American politician

- Born: April 21, 1845; Bennington, New York
- Died: October 31, 1906 (aged 61); Washington, D.C.
- Occupation: a commissioner of the Interstate Commerce Commission
- Years active: 1894–1905

James Dallas Yeomans (April 21, 1845 – October 31, 1906) was an American politician and railway executive, who served from 1894 to 1905 as a commissioner of the Interstate Commerce Commission.

Born in Bennington, New York, and educated there, Yeomans worked as a railwayman from age 17, rising to the position of general superintendent. After spending time building railways, he moved to Iowa, where was elected to the State Senate. He became head of a manufacturer's association, and was appointed to the Interstate Commerce Commission (ICC) in 1894 by President Grover Cleveland. Yeomans was reappointed by President William McKinley and then by Theodore Roosevelt. He retired from the commission in 1905 and spent time pursuing his business interests until he died in Washington, D.C., in 1906.

== Early life ==
Yeomans was born in Bennington, New York, and educated in the public schools there. In 1862, he obtained a job with the Erie Railroad Company, and served two years with the company. He then went to Chattanooga, Tennessee, and worked on railroads for the Federal Government for the remainder of the American Civil War.

== Executive ==
Yeomans returned to the Northeast after the war. In 1872, he became assistant superintendent of the Buffalo, New York and Philadelphia Railway, and a year later was made its superintendent. He also served as General Superintendent of the Olean, Bradford and Warren Railway. He was then involved in railroad building in New York, Pennsylvania, and Michigan.

== Politics ==
In 1888, Yeomans moved to Iowa, where he engaged in stock farming. In 1890, he was elected to the Iowa State Senate.

Yeomans helped organize the Sioux City Jobbers' and Manufacturers' Association, which became powerful in protecting the interest of the commercial cities of the Upper Midwest. It was the work for the association that suggested him as a candidate for the ICC.

On April 2, 1894, President Cleveland appointed him to fill an unexpired term through 1898, filling a vacancy caused by the death of Commissioner James W. McDill. Yeomans was confirmed by the Senate on April 27, and took the oath of office five days later. He was reappointed by President McKinley on January 6, 1899, for a full term ending December 31, 1904, and was confirmed the following day. President Roosevelt reappointed Yeomans on January 13, 1905, for a third term, and Yeomans was confirmed by the Senate the same day. He resigned on March 1, 1905, effective March 6, and was succeeded by former Senator Francis Cockrell.

After his retirement from the ICC, Yeomans devoted himself to his business interests. He died October 31, 1906, according to The New York Times of a complication of disease.
