= Henry Harrison Hoyt =

American politician

Henry Harrison Hoyt was an American politician. He was a member of the Wisconsin State Assembly.

== Biography ==
Hoyt was born on January 21, 1840, in Sheldon, New York. During the American Civil War, he served with the 5th Wisconsin Volunteer Infantry Regiment of the Union Army. Engagements he took part in include the Siege of Yorktown, the Battle of Williamsburg, the Battle of Crampton's Gap, the Battle of Antietam, the Battle of Fredericksburg and the Battle of Gettysburg.

== Assembly career ==
Hoyt was a member of the Assembly during the 1876 session. He was a Republican.
