= Sheldon, New York =

- Town
- Location within Wyoming County and New York

- Location within the state of New York
- Coordinates: 42°43′36″N 78°22′27″W
- Country: United States
- State: New York
- County: Wyoming

Area
  - Total: 47.37 sq mi (122.70 km^{2})
  - Land: 47.35 sq mi (122.63 km^{2})
  - Water: 0.027 sq mi (0.07 km^{2})
- Elevation: 1,490 ft (454 m)

Population (2010)
  - Total: 2,409
  - Estimate (2016): 2,317
  - Density: 48.9/sq mi (18.89/km^{2})
- Time zone: UTC-5 (Eastern (EST))
  - Summer (DST): UTC-4 (EDT)
- ZIP code: 14145
- Area code: 585
- FIPS code: 36-66773
- GNIS feature ID: 0979488
- Website: Town of Sheldon

Sheldon is an incorporated town in Wyoming County, New York. The population was 2,409 at the 2010 census. The Town of Sheldon is on the west border of Wyoming County. The town is southeast of Buffalo.

== History ==
The Town of Sheldon was founded in 1808 from part of the Town of Batavia. In 1811, the Town of Attica was formed from part of Sheldon, and the Towns of Bennington and Arcade were taken off in 1818. In 1835 a wave luxembourgish immigrants settled in Sheldon.

== Geography ==
According to the United States Census Bureau, the town has a total area of 47.4 square miles (123 km^{2}), of which 47.3 square miles (123 km^{2}) is land and 0.04 square miles (0.10 km^{2}) (0.06%) is water.

The west town line is the border of Erie County, New York. Cayuga Creek flows northward through the east part of the town and the Buffalo Creek flows through the southwest part.

U.S. Route 20A passes across the north part of the town and intersects New York State Route 77 at Persons Corners.

== Demographics ==
Historical population
Census	Pop.	Note	%±
1820	887		—
1830	1,731		95.2%
1840	2,353		35.9%
1850	2,527		7.4%
1860	2,794		10.6%
1870	2,258		−19.2%
1880	2,257		0.0%
1890	2,059		−8.8%
1900	1,801		−12.5%
1910	1,713		−4.9%
1920	1,593		−7.0%
1930	1,545		−3.0%
1940	1,578		2.1%
1950	1,618		2.5%
1960	1,898		17.3%
1970	2,296		21.0%
1980	2,644		15.2%
1990	2,487		−5.9%
2000	2,561		3.0%
2010	2,409		−5.9%
2016 (est.)	2,317		−3.8%
U.S. Decennial Census

As of the census of 2000, there were 2,561 people, 916 households, and 707 families residing in the town. The population density was 54.1 inhabitants per square mile (20.9/km^{2}). There were 973 housing units at an average density of 20.6 per square mile (8.0/km^{2}). The racial makeup of the town was 99.61% White, 0.04% African American, 0.04% Asian, 0.04% Pacific Islander, 0.16% from other races, and 0.12% from two or more races. Hispanic or Latino of any race were 0.23% of the population.

There were 916 households, out of which 35.0% had children under the age of 18 living with them, 65.5% were married couples living together, 7.3% had a female householder with no husband present, and 22.8% were non-families. 18.2% of all households were made up of individuals, and 7.9% had someone living alone who was 65 years of age or older. The average household size was 2.79 and the average family size was 3.20.

In the town, the population was spread out, with 27.0% under the age of 18, 8.3% from 18 to 24, 29.8% from 25 to 44, 22.5% from 45 to 64, and 12.5% who were 65 years of age or older. The median age was 36 years. For every 100 females, there were 104.2 males. For every 100 females age 18 and over, there were 102.4 males.

The median income for a household in the town was $43,232, and the median income for a family was $45,701. Males had a median income of $32,319 versus $21,549 for females. The per capita income for the town was $18,698. About 5.2% of families and 5.8% of the population were below the poverty line, including 9.4% of those under age 18 and 3.1% of those age 65 or over.

== Notable people ==
- Seth M. Gates, former U.S. Congressman from New York
- Henry Harrison Hoyt, former Wisconsin State Assemblyman
- Lester H. Humphrey, former New York State Senator
- Enos Warren Persons, Wisconsin state legislator and businessman
- Horace T. Sanders, colonel of the 19th Wisconsin Volunteer Infantry Regiment

== Communities and locations in Sheldon ==
- Dutch Hollow – A hamlet on the western border of the town, west of Sheldon village.
- Frinks Corners – A hamlet on the south border of the town, east of Strykersville.
- Harris Corners – A location in the northwest corner of the town, located on Route 20A.
- North Sheldon – A hamlet on Route 20A in the north part of the town.
- Persons Corners – A hamlet on the north border of the town, located on Route 20A at the junction of Route 77.
- Plants Corner – A hamlet east of Strykersville.
- Sheldon – A hamlet between Dutch Hollow and Sheldon Center on Centerline Road.
- Sheldon Center – A hamlet located on Centerline Road and Route 77, east of Sheldon village. The community is the location of town government.
- Strykersville – A hamlet in the southwest corner of Sheldon, located on Route 78.
- Toziers Corner – A hamlet east of Sheldon Center.
- Varysburg – A hamlet near the border of the Town of Orangeville, located at the intersection of Routes 20A and 98.
