= 1927 state highway renumbering (New York) =

New York state highway renumbering

Highways in New York were first marked with a unified numbering system in 1924. The first routes incorporated into this system were numbered up to 34, with generally north–south routes having even numbers and generally east–west routes having odd numbers. By 1927, this numbering had been expanded into the 70s, with spurs suffixed with letters. While the advent of the U.S. Highway System in 1926 didn't initially absorb the routes that were incorporated into the system, a small renumbering was done in 1927 to avoid overlapping route numbers.

This article is part of the highway renumbering series.
Alabama	1928, 1957
Arkansas	1926
California	1964
Colorado	1953, 1968
Connecticut	1932, 1963
Florida	1945
Indiana	1926
Iowa	1926, 1969
Louisiana	1955
Maine	1933
Massachusetts	1933
Minnesota	1934
Missouri	1926
Montana	1932
Nebraska	1926
Nevada	1976
New Jersey	1927, 1953
New Mexico	1926, 1988
New York	1927, 1930
North Carolina	1934, 1937, 1940, 1961
North Dakota	1926
Ohio	1923, 1927, 1962
Pennsylvania	1928, 1961
Puerto Rico	1953
South Carolina	1928, 1937
South Dakota	1927, 1975
Tennessee	1983
Texas	1939, 1990
Utah	1962, 1977
Virginia	1923, 1928, 1933, 1940, 1958
Washington	1964
Wisconsin	1926
Wyoming	1927

== 1924 System ==
Route	From	To	Status in 1927
1	NYC city line	Connecticut state line	Transferred to US 1
2	Pennsylvania state line	Rouses Point	Transferred to US 11
2A	Potsdam	Lawrenceville	Transferred to NY 56
3	Niagara Falls	Jay (via Malone)	Unchanged
4	Pennsylvania state line	Rochester	Renumbered to 2
5	Pennsylvania	Massachusetts	Transferred to US 20 from Pennsylvania to Buffalo and from Albany to Massachusetts
6	NYC city line	QC line	Transferred to US 9E and US 9
6A	Yonkers	Tarrytown	Renumbered to 9A
6B	East Greenbush	Waterford	Transferred to US 9E
7	Buffalo	Albany	Auburn to Albany transferred to US 20; section from Buffalo to Auburn renumbered 35, as old 35 was transferred to US 20
8	New Jersey state line	Newburgh	Unchanged
9	Binghamton	Vermont state line	Renumbered to 7
10	New Jersey state line	Plattsburgh	Section south of Waterford transferred to US 9W
11	Rome	Utica	Renumbered to 76
12	Binghamton	Clayton	Unchanged
13	Horseheads	Cazenovia	Unchanged
14	Pennsylvania state line	Alton	Unchanged
15	Owego	Rochester	Unchanged
16	Olean	Buffalo	Unchanged
17	Westfield	New Jersey state line	Unchanged
18	Pennsylvania state line	Buffalo	Unchanged
19	Kingston	Grand Gorge	Unchanged
20	Syracuse	Oswego	Renumbered to 57
21	Poughkeepsie	Connecticut state line	Unchanged
22	NYC city line	Valatie (via Austerlitz)	Unchanged
23	Norwich	Massachusetts state line	Unchanged
24	Austerlitz	Whitehall	Unchanged
25	NYC city line	Orient Point	Unchanged
26	Ithaca	Camillus	Unchanged
27	NYC city line	Montauk Point	Unchanged
28	Utica	Oneonta	Unchanged
29	Trenton	Salem	Unchanged
30	Mechanicville	QC line	Part from Glens Falls to Whitehall became cosigned as US 4
31	Oneida	Lewiston	Unchanged
32	Depew (at NY 5)	Olcott	Unchanged
33	Batavia	Rochester	Unchanged
34	Buffalo	Youngstown	Unchanged
35	East Aurora	Geneseo	Transferred to US 20
36	Hornell	Geneseo	Unchanged
37	Peekskill	Connecticut state line	Transferred to US 6
38	Belvidere	Penn Yan	Unchanged
39	Patterson	Poughkeepsie	Unchanged
40	Ithaca	Red Creek	Unchanged
41	Barrytown	Millerton	Unchanged
42	Owego	Freeville	Unchanged
43	Schoharie	Albany	Unchanged
44	Sidney	Utica	Unchanged
45	Troy	Massachusetts state line	Unchanged
46	Oriskany Falls	Boonville	Unchanged
47	Chestertown	Ticonderoga	Unchanged
48	Lowville	Alexandria Bay	Unchanged
49	Central Square	Rome	Unchanged
50	Port Jervis	Kingston	Transferred to US 6N
51	Deposit	Stamford	Unchanged
52	Geneva	Dansville	Unchanged
53	Horseheads	Candor	Unchanged
54	Utica	Fonda	Unchanged
55	New Jersey state line	Goshen	Unchanged
56	Nicholville	Meacham Lake	Extended over old 2A to Potsdam
58	Harriman	Newburgh	Unchanged
60	Pennsylvania state line	Fredonia	Unchanged
62	Belvidere	Yates	Unchanged
64	Oneonta	Margaretville	Unchanged
66	Claverack	Sand Lake (via Brainard)	Unchanged
68	Ogdensburg	Canton	Unchanged
70	Homer	Skaneateles	Unchanged
72	Naples	Pultneyville	Unchanged
74	Varysburg	Point Breeze	Unchanged

== 1927 System ==
Route	From	To	Pre-1927 designation
US 1	NYC city line	Connecticut state line	1
2	Pennsylvania state line	Rochester	4
3	Niagara Falls	Jay (via Malone)	3
US 4	Glens Falls	Vermont state line	N/A, 30
5	Buffalo	Albany	5
US 6	Pennsylvania state line	Connecticut state line	N/A, 37
US 6N	Port Jervis	Kingston	50
7	Binghamton	Vermont state line	9
8	New Jersey state line	Newburgh	8
US 9	Waterford	QC line	6
US 9E	NYC city line	Waterford	6, 6B
US 9W	New Jersey state line	Waterford	10
9A	Yonkers	Tarrytown	6A
10	Schenectady	Plattsburgh (via Saranac Lake)	10
US 11	Pennsylvania state line	Rouses Point	2
12	Binghamton	Clayton	12
13	Horseheads	Cazenovia	13
14	Pennsylvania state line	Alton	14
15	Owego	Rochester	15
16	Olean	Buffalo	16
17	Westfield	New Jersey state line	17
18	Pennsylvania state line	Buffalo	18
19	Kingston	Grand Gorge	19
US 20	Pennsylvania state line	Massachusetts state line	5, 35, 7, 5
21	Poughkeepsie	Connecticut state line	21
22	NYC city line	Valatie (via Austerlitz)	22
23	Norwich	Massachusetts state line	23
24	Austerlitz	Whitehall	24
25	NYC city line	Orient Point	25
26	Ithaca	Camillus	26
27	NYC city line	Montauk Point	27
28	Utica	Oneonta	28
29	Trenton	Salem	29
30	Mechanicville	QC line	30
31	Oneida	Lewiston	31
32	Depew (at NY 5)	Olcott	32
33	Batavia	Rochester	33
34	Buffalo	Youngstown	34
35	Buffalo	Avon Lake	7
36	Hornell	Geneseo	36
38	Belvidere	Penn Yan	38
39	Patterson	Poughkeepsie	39
40	Ithaca	Red Creek	40
41	Barrytown	Millerton	41
42	Owego	Freeville	42
43	Schoharie	Albany	43
44	Sidney	Utica	44
45	Troy	Massachusetts state line	45
46	Oriskany Falls	Boonville	46
47	Chestertown	Ticonderoga	47
48	Lowville	Alexandria Bay	48
49	Central Square	Rome	49
51	Deposit	Stamford	51
52	Geneva	Dansville	52
53	Horseheads	Candor	53
54	Utica	Fonda	54
55	New Jersey state line	Goshen	55
56	Nicholville	Meacham Lake	56, 2A
57	Syracuse	Oswego	20
58	Harriman	Newburgh	58
60	Pennsylvania state line	Fredonia	60
62	Belvidere	Yates	62
64	Oneonta	Margaretville	64
66	Claverack	Sand Lake (via Brainard)	66
68	Ogdensburg	Canton	68
70	Homer	Skaneateles	70
72	Naples	Pultneyville	72
74	Varysburg	Point Breeze	74
76	Rome	Utica	11
