= Corfu, New York =

- Village
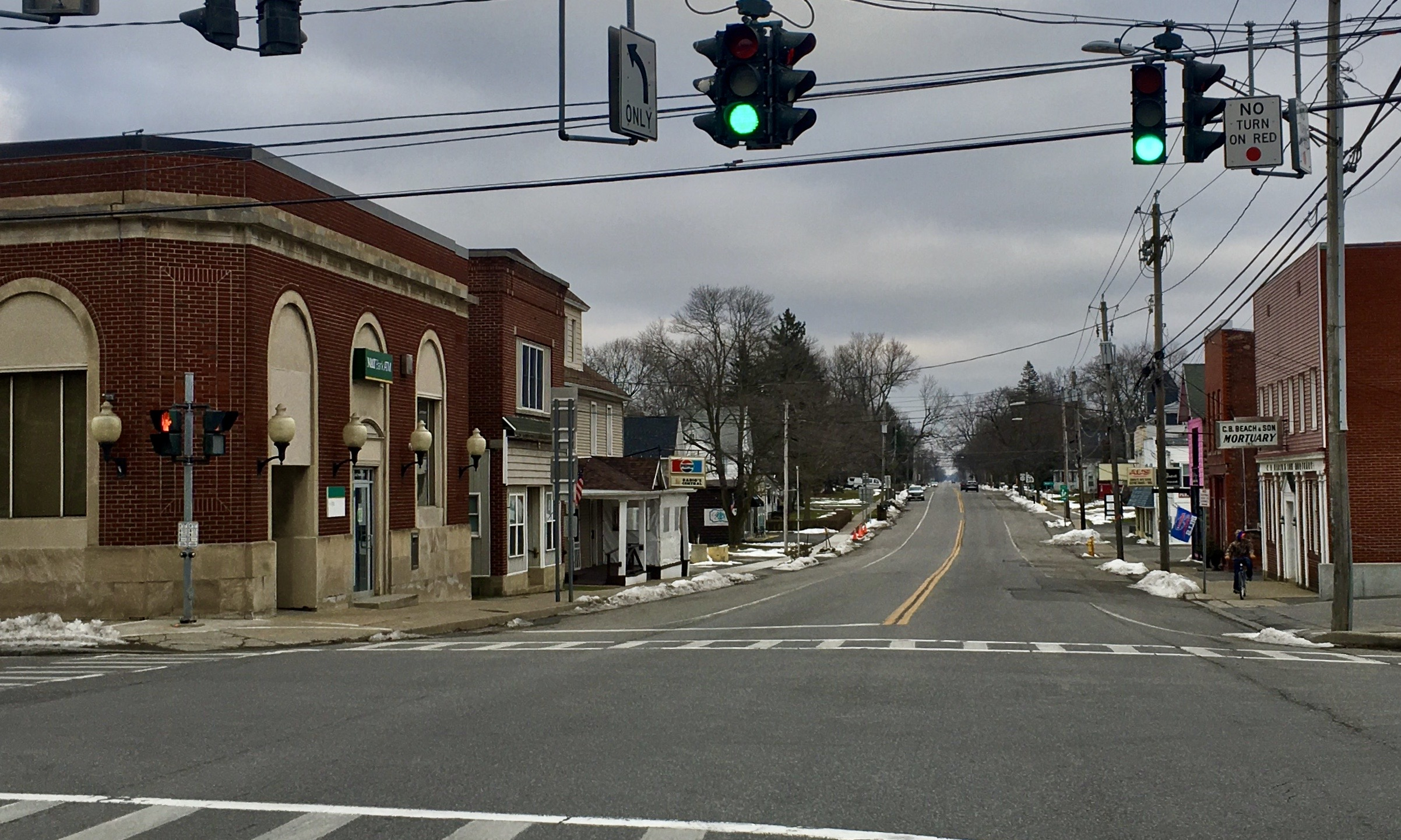
- Looking eastward down East Main Street, January 2021

- Location in Genesee County and the state of New York
- Coordinates: 42°57′31″N 78°24′14″W
- Country: United States
- State: New York
- County: Genesee
- Town: Pembroke

Area
  - Total: 1.00 sq mi (2.58 km^{2})
  - Land: 1.00 sq mi (2.58 km^{2})
  - Water: 0 sq mi (0.00 km^{2})
- Elevation: 863 ft (263 m)

Population (2020)
  - Total: 689
  - Density: 692.4/sq mi (267.33/km^{2})
- Time zone: UTC-5 (Eastern (EST))
  - Summer (DST): UTC-4 (EDT)
- ZIP code: 14036
- Area code: 585
- FIPS code: 36-18201
- GNIS feature ID: 0947446
- Website: www.corfuny.gov

Corfu (/ˈkɔːrfjuː/ KOR-fyoo) is a village in Genesee County, New York, United States. As of the 2020 census, Corfu had a population of 689. It is named after the Greek island of Corfu.

The village of Corfu lies along the southern edge of the town of Pembroke; about 1.5 acres (0.6 ha) within the village limits are within the town of Darien to the south.

== History ==
The early community was known as "Longs Corners". The name "Corfu" was adopted when a post office was established. The village of Corfu was incorporated in 1868.

== Geography ==
Corfu is located in western Genesee County at 42°57′31″N 78°24′14″W (42.958662, -78.403938). New York State Route 33 passes through the village as Main Street, leading east 11 miles (18 km) to Batavia, the county seat, and west 26 miles (42 km) to Buffalo. New York State Route 77 (Alleghany Road) intersects NY 33 in the center of Corfu, leading north, then west 27 miles (43 km) to Lockport and south 22 miles (35 km) to Java Center. Corfu is halfway along NY 77 between Six Flags Darien Lake to the south and the New York State Thruway to the north, both 3 miles (5 km) away.

According to the United States Census Bureau, the village of Corfu has a total area of 1.0 square mile (2.6 km^{2}), all land.

Murder Creek, a tributary of Tonawanda Creek, flows to the west through the village.

== Demographics ==
Historical population
Census	Pop.	Note	%±
1880	353		—
1890	398		12.7%
1900	401		0.8%
1910	413		3.0%
1920	458		10.9%
1930	418		−8.7%
1940	462		10.5%
1950	542		17.3%
1960	616		13.7%
1970	722		17.2%
1980	689		−4.6%
1990	755		9.6%
2000	795		5.3%
2010	709		−10.8%
2020	689		−2.8%
U.S. Decennial Census

As of the 2000 census, there were 795 people, 309 households, and 211 families residing in the village. The population density was 804.2 inhabitants per square mile (310.5/km^{2}). There were 336 housing units at an average density of 339.9 per square mile (131.2/km^{2}). The racial makeup of the village was 96.98% White, 0.88% African American, 0.63% Native American, 0.38% from other races, and 1.13% from two or more races. Hispanic or Latino of any race were 1.38% of the population.

There were 309 households, out of which 36.9% had children under the age of 18 living with them, 55.3% were married couples living together, 9.4% had a female householder with no husband present, and 31.7% were non-families. 24.3% of all households were made up of individuals, and 9.7% had someone living alone who was 65 years of age or older. The average household size was 2.57 and the average family size was 3.11.

In the village, the population was spread out, with 28.3% under the age of 18, 7.8% from 18 to 24, 32.5% from 25 to 44, 19.7% from 45 to 64, and 11.7% who were 65 years of age or older. The median age was 35 years. For every 100 females, there were 89.7 males. For every 100 females age 18 and over, there were 88.1 males.

The median income for a household in the village was $37,386, and the median income for a family was $46,667. Males had a median income of $32,917 versus $23,571 for females. The per capita income for the village was $15,909. 1.4% of families and 4.2% of the population were below the poverty line, including 2.6% of those under age 18 and 7.5% of those age 65 or over.
