= Orangeville, New York =

- Town
- Location in Wyoming County and the state of New York.

- Location within the state of New York
- Coordinates: 42°44′15″N 78°15′55″W
- Country: United States
- State: New York
- County: Wyoming

Area
  - Total: 35.64 sq mi (92.31 km^{2})
  - Land: 35.56 sq mi (92.10 km^{2})
  - Water: 0.081 sq mi (0.21 km^{2})
- Elevation: 1,800 ft (550 m)

Population (2010)
  - Total: 1,355
  - Estimate (2016): 1,314
  - Density: 37.0/sq mi (14.27/km^{2})
- Time zone: UTC-5 (Eastern (EST))
  - Summer (DST): UTC-4 (EDT)
- FIPS code: 36-55222
- GNIS feature ID: 0979317
- Website: Town of Orangeville

Orangeville is an incorporated town in Wyoming County, New York. The population was 1,301 at the 2000 census.

The Town of Orangeville is centrally located in the county. U.S. Route 20A passes across the town.

== History ==
The Town of Orangeville was established in 1816 from part of the Town of Attica. Orangeville later gave up part of its territory to form the Town of Wethersfield.

In June 2022 a series on arson fires destroyed two houses and a bunker silo in Orangeville and Wethersfield.

== Geography ==
According to the United States Census Bureau, the town has a total area of 35.7 square miles (92 km^{2}), of which 35.6 square miles (92 km^{2}) is land and 0.1 square miles (0.26 km^{2}) (0.25%) is water.

== Demographics ==
Historical population
Census	Pop.	Note	%±
1820	1,556		—
1830	1,525		−2.0%
1840	1,949		27.8%
1850	1,438		−26.2%
1860	1,419		−1.3%
1870	1,217		−14.2%
1880	1,164		−4.4%
1890	1,148		−1.4%
1900	1,005		−12.5%
1910	952		−5.3%
1920	838		−12.0%
1930	679		−19.0%
1940	699		2.9%
1950	648		−7.3%
1960	633		−2.3%
1970	820		29.5%
1980	1,103		34.5%
1990	1,115		1.1%
2000	1,301		16.7%
2010	1,355		4.2%
2016 (est.)	1,314		−3.0%
U.S. Decennial Census

As of the census of 2000, there were 1,301 people, 485 households, and 358 families residing in the town. The population density was 36.6 inhabitants per square mile (14.1/km^{2}). There were 602 housing units at an average density of 16.9 per square mile (6.5/km^{2}). The racial makeup of the town was 99.08% White, 0.08% African American, 0.08% Native American, 0.31% Asian, 0.08% from other races, and 0.38% from two or more races. Hispanic or Latino of any race were 0.31% of the population.

There were 485 households, out of which 34.0% had children under the age of 18 living with them, 63.1% were married couples living together, 6.2% had a female householder with no husband present, and 26.0% were non-families. 18.1% of all households were made up of individuals, and 5.6% had someone living alone who was 65 years of age or older. The average household size was 2.68 and the average family size was 3.07.

In the town, the population was spread out, with 26.4% under the age of 18, 6.2% from 18 to 24, 30.6% from 25 to 44, 27.0% from 45 to 64, and 9.8% who were 65 years of age or older. The median age was 37 years. For every 100 females, there were 100.2 males. For every 100 females age 18 and over, there were 101.9 males.

The median income for a household in the town was $45,208, and the median income for a family was $49,643. Males had a median income of $36,146 versus $24,615 for females. The per capita income for the town was $18,547. About 7.2% of families and 9.5% of the population were below the poverty line, including 14.7% of those under age 18 and 5.9% of those age 65 or over.

== Notable people ==
- Theodore H. Barrett, United States Army officer
- Harry Jeremiah Parks, Medal of Honor recipient

== Communities and locations in Orangeville ==
- Dutch Flats — A hamlet on Buffalo Road near the northern town line.
- Halls Corners — A hamlet on Route 20A near the eastern town line.
- Johnsonburg — A hamlet on the border shared with the Town of Sheldon.
- Orangeville Center — A hamlet on Route 20A in the middle of the town.
- Quaker Town — A hamlet on Route 362 south of Orangeville Center.
