= Ely S. Parker =

American general, engineer, law reader and diplomat

- Hasanoanda
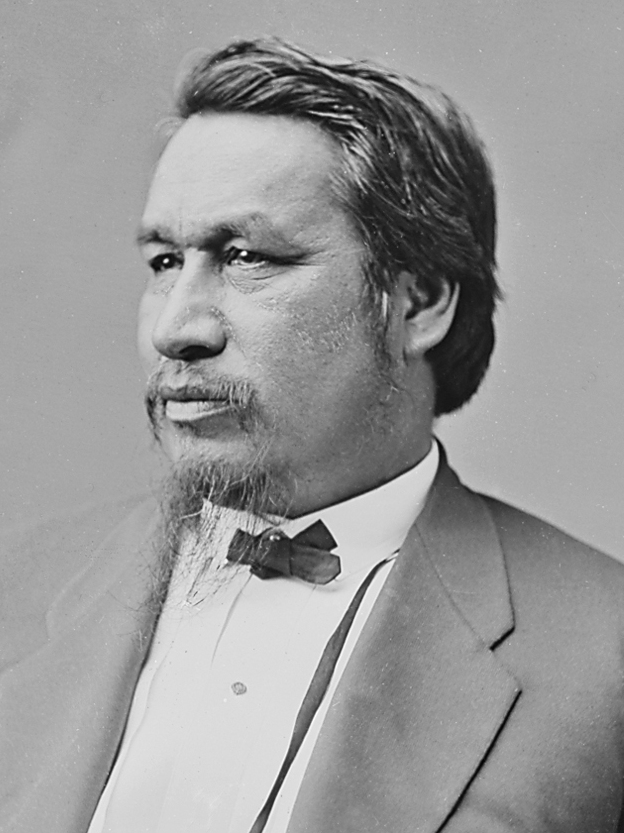

Dó:nihogä́:'wëh
- In office 1852–1895

16th Commissioner of Indian Affairs
- In office 1869–1871
- President: Ulysses S. Grant
- Preceded by: Nathaniel Green Taylor
- Succeeded by: Francis Amasa Walker

Personal details
- Born: Ely Samuel Parker; 1828 Indian Falls, New York, U.S.
- Died: August 31, 1895 (aged 66–67) Fairfield, Connecticut, U.S.
- Resting place: Forest Lawn Cemetery, Buffalo, New York, U.S.
- Spouse: Minnie Orton Sackett (m. 1867)
- Relatives: Red Jacket (great grand-uncle)

Military service
- Allegiance: United States
- Branch/service: United States Army (Union Army)
- Years of service: 1863–1869
- Rank: Colonel; Brevet brigadier general
- Unit: Adjutant to General U.S. Grant; 2nd U.S. Cavalry Regiment
- Battles/wars: American Civil War; Siege of Vicksburg; Battle of Chattanooga; Overland Campaign; Siege of Petersburg; Appomattox campaign

Ely Samuel Parker (1828 – August 31, 1895), born Hasanoanda and later condoled as Donehogawa (Seneca: Dó:nihogä́:'wëh), was a Tonawanda Seneca United States Army general and a commissioner of the Bureau of Indian Affairs. He was bilingual, speaking both Seneca and English, and became friends with Lewis Henry Morgan, who became a student of the Haudenosaunee in Upstate New York. Parker earned an engineering degree in college and worked on the Erie Canal, and other projects.

A Hoyaneh of the Seneca, Parker was commissioned as a lieutenant colonel during the American Civil War, when he served as adjutant and secretary to General Ulysses S. Grant. He wrote the final draft of the Confederate surrender terms at Appomattox. Later in his career, Parker rose to the rank of brevet brigadier general.

When General Grant became president in 1869, he appointed Parker as Commissioner of Indian Affairs, the first Native American to hold that post.

== Early life and education ==
Ely Parker was born in 1828 as the sixth of seven children to Elizabeth and William Parker at Indian Falls, New York, which was then part of the Tonawanda Reservation. He was named Ha-sa-no-an-da and later baptized as Samuel Parker. Both of his parents were of prominent Seneca families; while his father was a miller by trade and a Baptist minister, he was also respected as a Tonawanda Seneca chief who had fought for the United States in the War of 1812. His mother was the granddaughter of Sos-he-o-wa, the successor of the great Haudenosaunee spiritual leader Handsome Lake.

His parents strongly supported education for all their children, whose Christian names were Spencer Houghton Cone, Nicholson Henry, Levi, Caroline (Carrie), Newton, and Solomon, all with the surname of Parker. One of his elder brothers, Nicholson Parker, also became a prominent Seneca leader, as he was a powerful orator, much like the family's famous relation Red Jacket had been. Ely had a classical education at a missionary school, and was fully bilingual, speaking the Seneca language as well as English. He also studied in college. He spent his life bridging his identities as a Seneca and a resident of the United States.

Beginning in the 1840s, when Ely was a teenager, the Parker home became a meeting place of non-Indian scholars who were interested in the Haudenosaunee, including Lewis Henry Morgan, Henry Rowe Schoolcraft, and John Wesley Powell. They all played a role in the studies that formed ethnology and anthropology as an academic discipline.

As a young man, Parker worked in a legal firm, reading law for the customary three years with an established firm in Ellicottville, New York, before applying to take the bar examination. He was not permitted to take it because as a Seneca, he was not then considered a United States citizen. All American Indians were not considered citizens until passage of the Indian Citizenship Act of 1924, but by that time, some two-thirds were American citizens due to other circumstances, including having served in the U.S. military.

Parker encountered scholar Lewis Henry Morgan through a chance meeting in a bookstore. At the time Morgan was a young lawyer involved in forming "The Grand Order of the Iroquois", a fraternity of young white men from Upstate New York who romanticized their image of the American Indian and wanted to model their group after "Iroquois" ideals. The two bridged their cultures to become friends, and Parker invited Morgan to visit the Tonawanda Reservation in New York state. Parker became Morgan's main source of information and an entrée to others in the Seneca and other Haudenosaunee nations. Morgan later dedicated his book League of the Iroquois, published in 1851, to Parker, noting that, "the materials are the fruit of our joint researches".

The relationship proved important for both men; as Parker helped Morgan become an anthropological pioneer, Morgan helped Parker make connections in the larger white-dominated society in which he later worked and lived. With Morgan's help, Parker gained admission to study engineering at Rensselaer Polytechnic Institute in Troy, New York.

== Career ==
Parker worked as a civil engineer until the start of the American Civil War. Parker was later appointed by President Ulysses S. Grant to Commissioner of Indian Affairs, a position that Morgan once aspired to hold.

Parker began his career in public service by working as an interpreter and diplomat for the Seneca chiefs in their negotiations with the United States government about land and treaty rights. In 1852, he was condoled a Hoyaneh (sachem) of the Seneca and given the name Donehogawa (Seneca: Dó:nihogä́:'wëh), "Keeper of the Western Door of the Long House of the Iroquois".

As an engineer, Parker contributed to upgrades and maintenance of the Erie Canal, among other projects. As a supervisor of government projects in Galena, Illinois, he befriended Ulysses S. Grant, forming a strong and collegial relationship that was useful later.

=== American Civil War ===
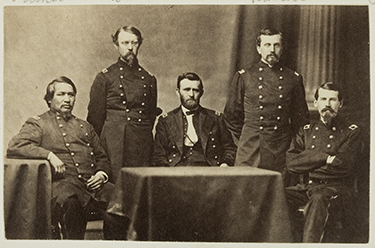
A 19th century photo of General Ulysses S. Grant and staff, including (from left to right): Parker (left sitting), Adam Badeau, General Grant (at table), Orville Elias Babcock, and Horace Porter, now on display at Harvard Art Museums at Harvard University

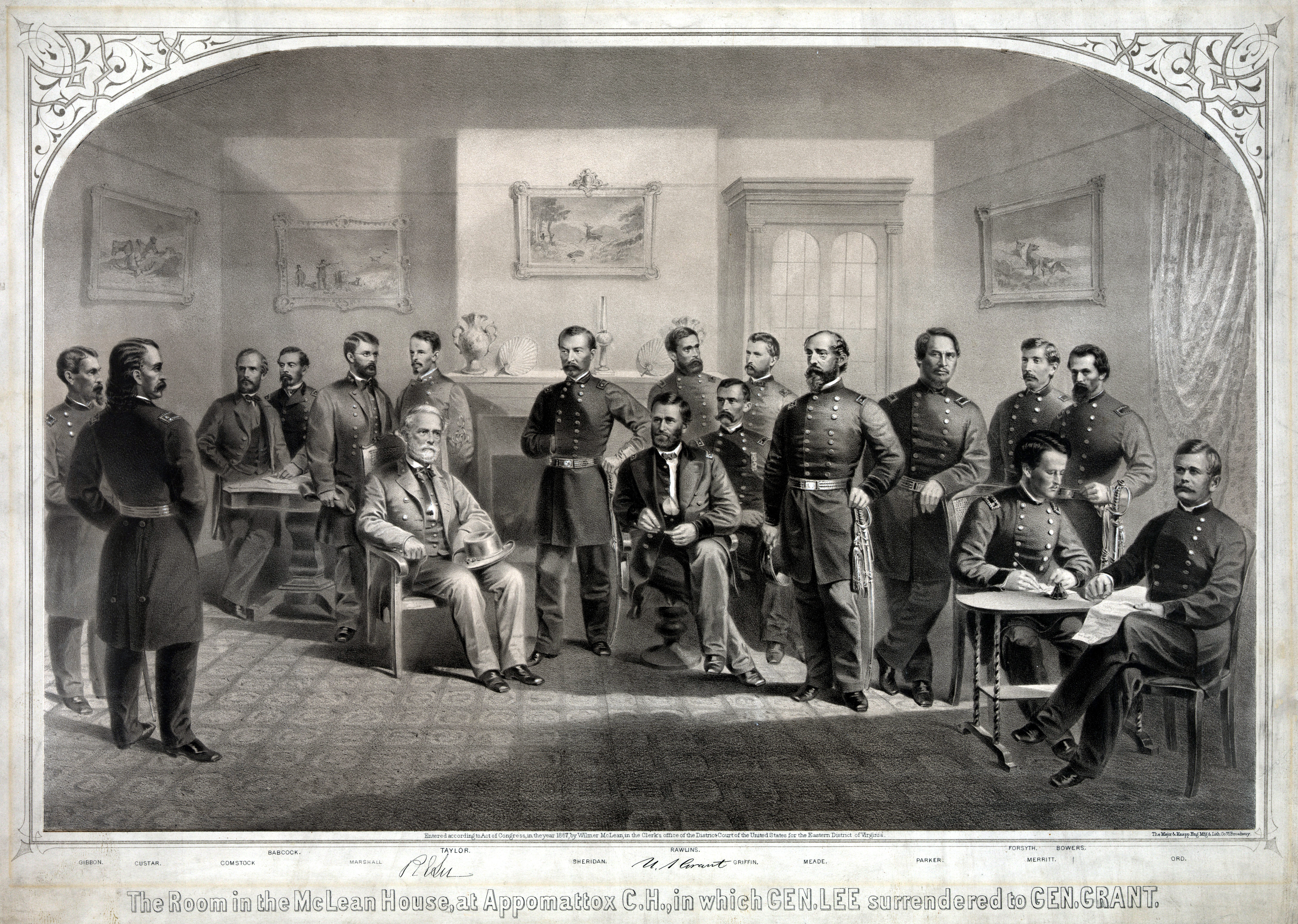
Surrender at Appomattox, a portrait depicting Confederate Army general Robert E. Lee's surrender to Union Army general Ulysses S. Grant with Parker in the back row (third from right)

Near the start of the American Civil War, Parker tried to raise a regiment of Haudenosaunee volunteers to fight for the Union, but was turned down by New York Governor Edwin D. Morgan. He tried to enlist in the Union Army as an engineer, but was told by Secretary of War Simon Cameron that, as an Indian, he could not join. Parker contacted his colleague and friend Ulysses S. Grant, whose forces suffered from a shortage of engineers. Parker was commissioned a captain in May 1863 and ordered to report to Brig. Gen. John Eugene Smith. Smith appointed Parker as the chief engineer of his 7th Division during the siege of Vicksburg, and later said Parker was a "good engineer".

When Ulysses S. Grant became commander of the Military Division of the Mississippi, Parker became his adjutant during the Chattanooga campaign. He was subsequently transferred with Grant as the adjutant of the U.S. Army headquarters and served Grant through the Overland Campaign and the Siege of Petersburg. At Petersburg, Parker was appointed as the military secretary to Grant, with the rank of lieutenant colonel. He wrote much of Grant's correspondence.

Parker was present when Confederate general Robert E. Lee surrendered at Appomattox Courthouse in April 1865. He helped draft the surrender documents, which are in his handwriting. At the time of surrender, General Lee "stared at me for a moment", said Parker to more than one of his friends and relatives, "He extended his hand and said, 'I am glad to see one real American here.' I shook his hand and said, 'We are all Americans.'" Parker was brevetted brigadier general of United States Volunteers on April 9, 1865, and of United States Army March 2, 1867.

== Post-Civil War ==
After the Civil War, Parker was commissioned as an officer in the 2nd United States Cavalry on July 1, 1866. On July 25, 1866 he again became the military secretary to Grant, with the rank of colonel, and served throughout Grant's tenure as commanding general of the U.S. Army, which ended when Grant became president of the United States on March 4, 1869. Parker was a member of the Southern Treaty Commission, which renegotiated treaties with tribes who had sided with the Confederacy, were mostly from Indian Territory. On April 26, 1869, Parker resigned from the army with the rank of brevet brigadier general of the regular army.

On April 6, 1887, Parker was elected a Veteran Companion of the New York Commandery of the Military Order of the Loyal Legion of the United States, a military society of officers of the Union armed forces and their descendants. He was assigned the Order's insignia number 5414.

=== Appointment under Grant ===
Shortly after Grant took office as president in March 1869, he appointed Parker as Commissioner of Indian Affairs. He was the first Native American to hold the office. Parker became the chief architect of President Grant's Peace Policy in relation to the Native Americans in the West. Under his leadership, the number of military actions against Indians were reduced, and there was an effort to support tribes in their transition to living on reservations. In 1871, however, a disaffected former Commissioner of Indian Affairs named William Welsh accused Parker of corruption. Although Parker was cleared of any significant wrongdoing by the House Committee on Appropriations, his position was stripped of much of its power and he resigned in 1871.

=== Post Commissioner of Indian Affairs ===
Ely Parker before 1895

After leaving government service, Parker invested in the stock market. At first he did well, but in the Panic of 1873 he lost the fortune he had accumulated.

Through his social connections, Parker received an appointment for an administrative position in the Committee on Supplies and Repairs of the Board of Commissioners of the New York Police Department. Parker received many visits from social reform advocate Jacob Riis, the photographer famous for documenting the lives of slum dwellers.

== Personal life ==
After the war, in 1867 Parker married a white woman, Minnie Orton Sackett. Ulysses S. Grant walked her down the aisle at their wedding. They had one daughter, Maud Theresa Parker (1878–1956).

== Later life, death, and reinterment ==
Parker lived his last years in poverty, dying in Fairfield, Connecticut, on August 31, 1895. He originally was buried in Connecticut, but the Seneca did not believe that this Algonquian territory was appropriate for his final resting place. They requested that his widow relocate his body. On January 20, 1897, his body was exhumed and reinterred at Forest Lawn Cemetery in Buffalo, New York. He was buried next to his ancestor Red Jacket, a famous Seneca orator, and other notable Senecas of Western New York.

On November 14, 2025, Parker was posthumously admitted to the bar of the State of New York at a courthouse in Buffalo by the New York Supreme Court, Appellate Division, Fourth Department. He had been previously denied admission to the bar on the grounds that Native Americans were not legally citizens of the United States until 1924.

== Legacy ==
- Ely S. Parker Building of the Bureau of Indian Affairs in Reston, Virginia
- Parker's career and influence on contemporary Native Americans is described in Chapter 8 of Dee Brown's Bury My Heart at Wounded Knee.
- He is said to have helped found the town of Parker, Arizona. Another individual with the surname of Parker is credited with this distinction as well. The Arizona Republic, dated April 29, 1871, indicates that the new post office was named after "Ely Parker".
- Parker is honored on the reverse of the 2022 Sacagawea dollar coin.

== In popular culture ==
- Jacob Riis featured Parker as a character in a short story, "A Dream of the Woods", about a Mohawk woman and her child stranded in Grand Central Terminal.
- Asa-Luke Twocrow plays Ely Parker in the film Lincoln (2012), directed by Steven Spielberg.
- Gregory Sierra plays him in Season 3, Episode 7 of the American TV series Dr. Quinn, Medicine Woman.
- Parker is featured as a character in the novels Grant Comes East and Never Call Retreat.
- Parker is featured in Season 2 of the podcast drama 1865.
- Parker is introduced and quoted with photos in the documentary TV series: Parker appears and speaks—on-screen—around minute 40:30 in Part 5, “The Dogs of War” of Lincoln: Divided We Stand (2021)

== See also ==
- Fellows v. Blacksmith Parker acting as plaintiff for Blacksmith's estate before the United States Supreme Court
- Arthur C. Parker, Nephew and biographer of Ely Parker
