= Bennington, New York =

- Town
- Location in Wyoming County and the state of New York.
- Coordinates: 42°49′45″N 78°24′49″W
- Country: United States
- State: New York
- County: Wyoming

Area
  - Total: 55.26 sq mi (143.13 km^{2})
  - Land: 55.05 sq mi (142.59 km^{2})
  - Water: 0.21 sq mi (0.54 km^{2})
- Elevation: 1,220 ft (372 m)

Population (2010)
  - Total: 3,359
  - Estimate (2018): 3,240
  - Density: 61.0/sq mi (23.56/km^{2})
- Time zone: UTC-5 (Eastern (EST))
  - Summer (DST): UTC-4 (EDT)
- FIPS code: 36-05936
- GNIS feature ID: 0978722
- Website: www.benningtonny.com

Bennington is a town in Wyoming County, New York, United States. The population was 3,235 during the 2020 census. The town was named after Bennington, Vermont.

Geographically, the town of Bennington is the largest in Wyoming County, occupying a significant portion of the county's northwest corner.

== History ==
The Town of Bennington was formed in 1818 from the Town of Sheldon. The Town of Bennington officially came into existence on March 6, 1818. The name came from Bennington, Vermont.

This narrative was written by Alma Janish, a former Town Historian, archived from the original on July 7, 2011:

"In 1802, the land of Bennington was part of the Town of Batavia, Genesee County. Then in 1808, the land was taken from the Town of Batavia, to form the Town of Sheldon. Finally, on March 6, 1818, the land of Bennington was taken from Sheldon to form the Town of Bennington.

In the summer of 1802, John Tolles settled in Bennington. He settled in the area known over the years as Hubbard's Corners, Danley's Corners and the "Beehive".

The first frame barn was erected in the township by Jacob Wright in 1805.

By 1806, over twenty families were located in the town. A tannery, shoe shop and blacksmith shop were erected. By 1807, the first school house was built. A sawmill was also built in the south part of the town near the Sheldon Town line. In 1806, Chauncey Loomis purchased large tracts of land in the third and fourth ranges of the township at the price of one dollar per acre, including all the land now known as Bennington Center. During 1807, a sawmill was built in Bennington Center and the first barn raised was built from lumber produced from the mill. Also in 1807, the road from Bennington to Sheldon was cut out.

Approximately nine years after the Loomis family settled in Bennington, Quartus Clapp set out to purchase his own land further west in the town. He selected a site four miles down Cayuga Creek near a waterfall and built a sawmill in 1816 or 1818. He purchased about a hundred acres, which covered more than half of the valley of the hamlet of Cowlesville. At that time it was known as Clapp's Mills.

During 1826, Quartus Clapp built a grist mill adjoining his sawmill. This grist mill was the first of its kind in this town.

In 1827, Gaius B. Rich came from Attica and established the first store in Clapp's Mills. A young man, Hiram Cowles, clerked in this store in 1831. It was at this store that mail came once a week for the local settlers to pick up. It is believed that Hiram Cowles had a great deal to do in establishing the Post Office at Clapp's Mills, for on March 11, 1831, he was appointed Postmaster. In his honor, the settlement received the name of [Cowlesville].

The hamlet of Folsomdale is three miles southwest of Bennington Center. John Fitch came to Folsomdale, built a house, set out an orchard and built a saw and grist mill, about 1823. Little is known about Fitch but his property was purchased in 1825 by David Scott. He began a mercantile and milling business in this area.

When David Scott owned the land Folsomdale is located on, the name of Scottsville was given to it. About 1831, Benjamin Folsom came to Scottsville to manage a store for Mr. Scott. In 1834–1835, Mr. Scott built a tavern. It was later owned and operated by Mr. Folsom and it was after that, the hamlet was named Folsomdale.

On January 23, 1875, a meeting was held in Cowlesville with the purpose of dividing the Township into two towns. A resolution was drawn up and presented to the Board of Supervisors. The board, with a vote of ten to five, approved the resolution to create a new town on February 25, 1875. The new township was to be "Elmont". When the request was sent to the Legislature of New York State, there was some error in proceedings and the proposal died in Albany.

Until the 1930s, town meetings were probably held in the schoolhouse at Bennington Center. In 1936, during Franklin D. Roosevelt's presidency, the Works Progress Administration, known as W.P.A., provided jobs in building projects for a long-range value. The Town of Bennington had their town hall built. The federal government furnished the cost of labor for the building. The building is still used for the Town meetings. Several other organizations also use it.

Bennington was mainly a farming community. The Town had several small schools. The last school to close its doors was District #17, located in Cowlesville.

The town of Bennington boasted of six covered bridges to span the Cayuga Creek. The last of the six, known as the Ellis-Chesbro covered bridge, was destroyed by fire on March 17, 1966. It was the last structure of its kind that existed in New York State west of the Finger Lakes. The Ellis-Chesbro Bridge was the location of scenes shot for MGM's motion picture "The Great Waltz".

Frances Folsom, the granddaughter of John B. Folsom, became the First Lady of the United States. She spent much time as a young girl in Folsomdale. Frances Folsom was married to President Grover Cleveland, June 2, 1886, at the White House in Washington, D.C.

The Town of Bennington has had several churches. The first Baptist Church in Bennington Center was erected in 1832, the second in 1857 and that was destroyed by fire in 1886. It was rebuilt in 1887. BY 1925, the membership had diminished to five. The church was sold to the Cowlesville Baptist Society. They dismantled it and rebuilt it as an addition to their church.

The United Church of Christ in Bennington Center was dedicated in 1844. The Sacred Heart Catholic Church was erected at Bennington Center in 1871. The East Bennington Evangelic and United Brethren Church dates back to the early 19th century. The Catholic Church, Our Lady Help of Christians, in East Bennington was built in 1855. The Cowlesville Baptist Church was built in 1872 and an addition was added in 1924 or 1925. Cowlesville also had a Universalist Church which was dedicated in 1845. In 1914, the building was sold to the I.O.O.F. Lodge. It was eventually dismantled. The German Baptist Church was erected in 1869 at Folsomdale. There also was a Free Will Baptist Church in Folsomdale dedicated in 1858. The building was torn down in the early 20th century.

== Geography ==
According to the United States Census Bureau, the town has a total area of 55.26 square miles (143.1 km^{2}), of which 55.05 square miles (142.6 km^{2}) is land and 0.21 square miles (0.54 km^{2}) (0.40%) is water.

The western town line is the border of Erie County, and the northern town line is the boundary of Erie and Genesee counties.

New York State Route 77 and NYS 354 (Clinton Street) pass through the town. New York State Route 98 crosses the southeastern corner of the town.

== Demographics ==
Historical population
Census	Pop.	Note	%±
1820	796		—
1830	2,217		178.5%
1840	2,368		6.8%
1850	2,406		1.6%
1860	2,615		8.7%
1870	2,385		−8.8%
1880	2,365		−0.8%
1890	2,029		−14.2%
1900	1,904		−6.2%
1910	1,742		−8.5%
1920	1,557		−10.6%
1930	1,515		−2.7%
1940	1,481		−2.2%
1950	1,558		5.2%
1960	1,983		27.3%
1970	2,544		28.3%
1980	2,889		13.6%
1990	3,046		5.4%
2000	3,349		9.9%
2010	3,359		0.3%
2018 (est.)	3,240		−3.5%
US Decennial Census

=== 2000 census ===
As of the 2000 United States census there were 3,349 people, 1,208 households, and 966 families in the town. The population density was 60.9/sqmi (23.5/km^{2}). There were 1,273 housing units at an average density of 23.1/sqmi (8.93/km^{2}). The racial makeup of the town was 99.07% White, 0.06% African American, 0.12% Native American, 0.12% Asian, 0.03% from other races, and 0.60% from two or more races. Hispanic or Latino of any race were 0.27% of the population.

There were 1,208 households, out of which 34.4% had children under the age of 18 living with them, 70.6% were married couples living together, 6.0% had a female householder with no husband present, and 20.0% were non-families. 16.2% of all households were made up of individuals, and 6.0% had someone living alone who was 65 years of age or older. The average household size was 2.77 and the average family size was 3.11.

The town population contained 24.9% under the age of 18, 6.6% from 18 to 24, 29.3% from 25 to 44, 27.8% from 45 to 64, and 11.4% who were 65 years of age or older. The median age was 39 years. For every 100 females, there were 107.1 males. For every 100 females age 18 and over, there were 106.2 males.

The median income for a household in the town was $45,448, and the median income for a family was $48,966. Males had a median income of $35,233 versus $28,292 for females. The per capita income for the town was $18,247. About 3.4% of families and 6.2% of the population were below the poverty line, including 9.2% of those under age 18 and 6.6% of those age 65 or over.

== Notable people ==
- George Gilbert Hoskins, former US Congressman and Lt. Governor of New York
- Justin Rolph Loomis, second president of Bucknell University
- Paul J. Smith, arts administrator
- James D. Yeomans, former commissioner of the Interstate Commerce Commission

== Communities and locations in Bennington ==
- Bennington Center (or Bennington) – A hamlet at Routes 77 and 354.
- Cowlesville – A hamlet in the northwest part of town on Route 354. (ZIP code 14037)
- Folsomdale – A hamlet south of Route 354 on Folsomdale Road. Former home of Frances Folsom, First Lady and wife to Grover Cleveland.
- Schoellkopf Scout Reservation – A camp south of Route 354 on Burrough Road owned by the Greater Niagara Frontier Council Boy Scouts of America.

A broadcast tower in the southwest corner of the town serves as the transmitter for WNYO-TV (licensed to Buffalo) and FM station WLOF (licensed to Elma).

== See also ==
- Iroquois Central School District
