= Robert Laben =

American academic (1920–2005)

- Born: November 16, 1920
- Died: August 7, 2005 (aged 84)
- Occupation: Academic
- Spouse: Dorothy

Academic background
- Education: University of Missouri; New York State College of Agriculture and Life Sciences at Cornell University

Robert Laben (November 16, 1920 – August 7, 2005) was an American academic.

Laben was raised in Genesee County, New York, on a dairy farm. In 1948, he attended Cornell University. Upon graduating from Cornell University, he became a second lieutenant in the Army Field Artillery and was stationed at Ft. Niagra, New York. He was severely wounded multiple times in battle but continued to return to action until he retired from the US Army as a Captain. In 1950, he was hired at the University of California, Davis. He is a Professor of Emeritus of Animal Sciences. For 36 years he was a highly regarded teacher and active faculty member. In addition he was a respected undergraduate advisor known for his open door policy and genuine concern for students. For 17 years he served as the Master Advisor of Animal Science. Laben retired in 1986 yet continued to remain active in the University. He served as a member of Animal Science Departs Memorial Fund Committee which supports undergraduate student activities. His Department also named an undergraduate scholarship after him and wife Dorothy. He also throughout his lifetime was a generous contributor to funds supporting service. He and his wife died on August 7, 2005, after their car got stuck on a remote desert road.

In his honor, a UC Davis residence hall was named after Laben during the 2006-2007 school year. Laben Hall stands in the South Tercero Residence Area.
