= Indian Falls, New York =

Indian Falls
- Hamlet
- Location within New York Location within the United States
- Coordinates: 43°01′30″N 78°23′52″W
- Country: United States
- State: New York
- County: Genesee

Population (2000)
  - Total: 795

Indian Falls is a hamlet located closely within the northern border of the town of Pembroke and the western edge of Genesee County, Western New York, United States. Located in what was traditional Seneca nation territory for hundreds of years, the town was named also for a waterfall near its center, where Tonawanda Creek flows over the Onondaga escarpment.

== History ==
Indian Falls was the territory of the Seneca Nation, Keeper of the Western Door among the first Five Nations of the Haudenosaunee (Iroquois League), who occupied much of upstate and western New York for centuries before European exploration. Allied with the British during the American Revolutionary War, the Seneca were forced to cede most of their territory to the United States after it gained independence. Many went to Canada and their descendants live on the Six Nation Reserve. Some stayed in New York on the Tonawanda Reservation.

Ely Parker was born in 1828 to Seneca parents, in a log cabin overlooking the waterfalls. The area was part of the Tonawanda Reservation at the time. He became an engineer and military officer, serving as an aide to General Ulysses S. Grant. He wrote the final draft of the Confederate surrender terms at Appomattox ending the Civil War. As president, Grant appointed Parker in 1870 as the first Native American to be Commissioner of Indian Affairs.

Indian Falls incorporated as a village in 1868, but the community later abandoned that status.

== Geography ==
As of the 2000 census, the unincorporated community had a total population of 795.

The "Big Falls" (as they are known locally) are visible when taking a turn onto Gilmore Road, which is nearby the former house of Ely S. Parker. Route 77 travels North and South, while Tonawanda Creek flows in a westerly direction through the hamlet.

== Notable person ==
- Ely S. Parker, former lieutenant colonel during the Civil War
