= Darien Lakes State Park =

State park in New York State, United States

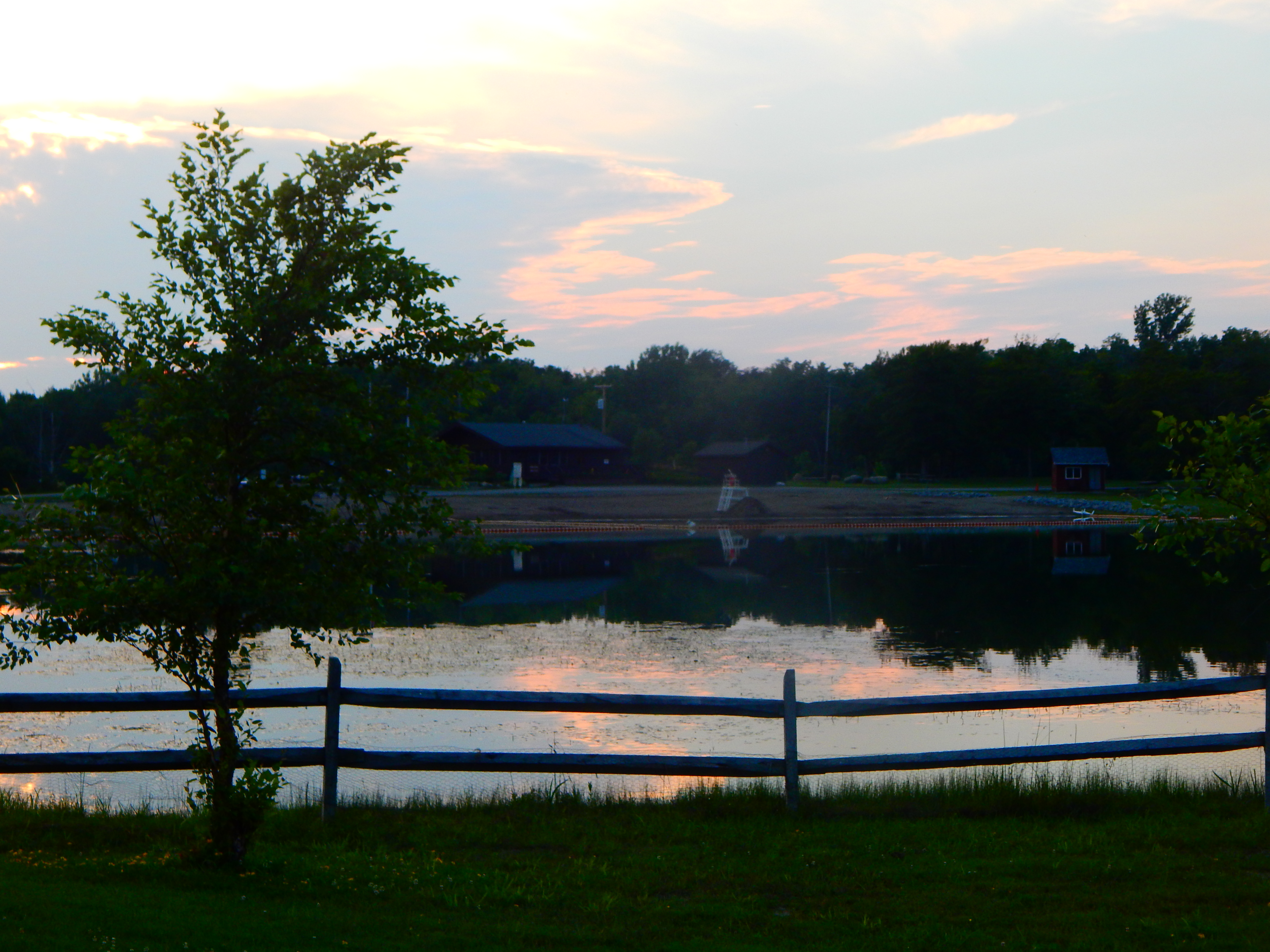
- View of Harlow Lake at Darien Lakes State Park

- Location within New York
- Interactive map of Darien Lakes State Park
- Type: State park
- Location: 10475 Harlow Road; Darien Center, New York
- Nearest city: Batavia, New York
- Coordinates: 42°54′N 78°26′W
- Area: 1,845 acres (7.47 km^{2})
- Operator: New York State Office of Parks, Recreation and Historic Preservation
- Visitors: 68,360 (in 2014)
- Open: All year
- Camp sites: 154
- Website: Darien Lakes State Park

Darien Lakes State Park is a 1,845-acre (7.47 km^{2}) state park in western Genesee County, New York, near Darien Center. The park entrance is on Harlow Road, north of U.S. Route 20.

== Park description ==
The park has 154 campsites, the majority with electrical hookups, and operates primarily as a campground. This portion of the park is open seasonally and mostly accommodates RV and trailer camping, although tent camping is available as well.

Besides the campground, the park also offers a beach on 12-acre (4.9 ha) Harlow Lake, picnic tables, a playground, recreation programs, a nature trail, hiking and biking, a bridle path, fishing, cross-country skiing and snowmobiling. Seasonal small game and deer hunting is allowed with the proper permit.

== See also ==
- List of New York state parks
