= Basom, New York =

- Hamlet
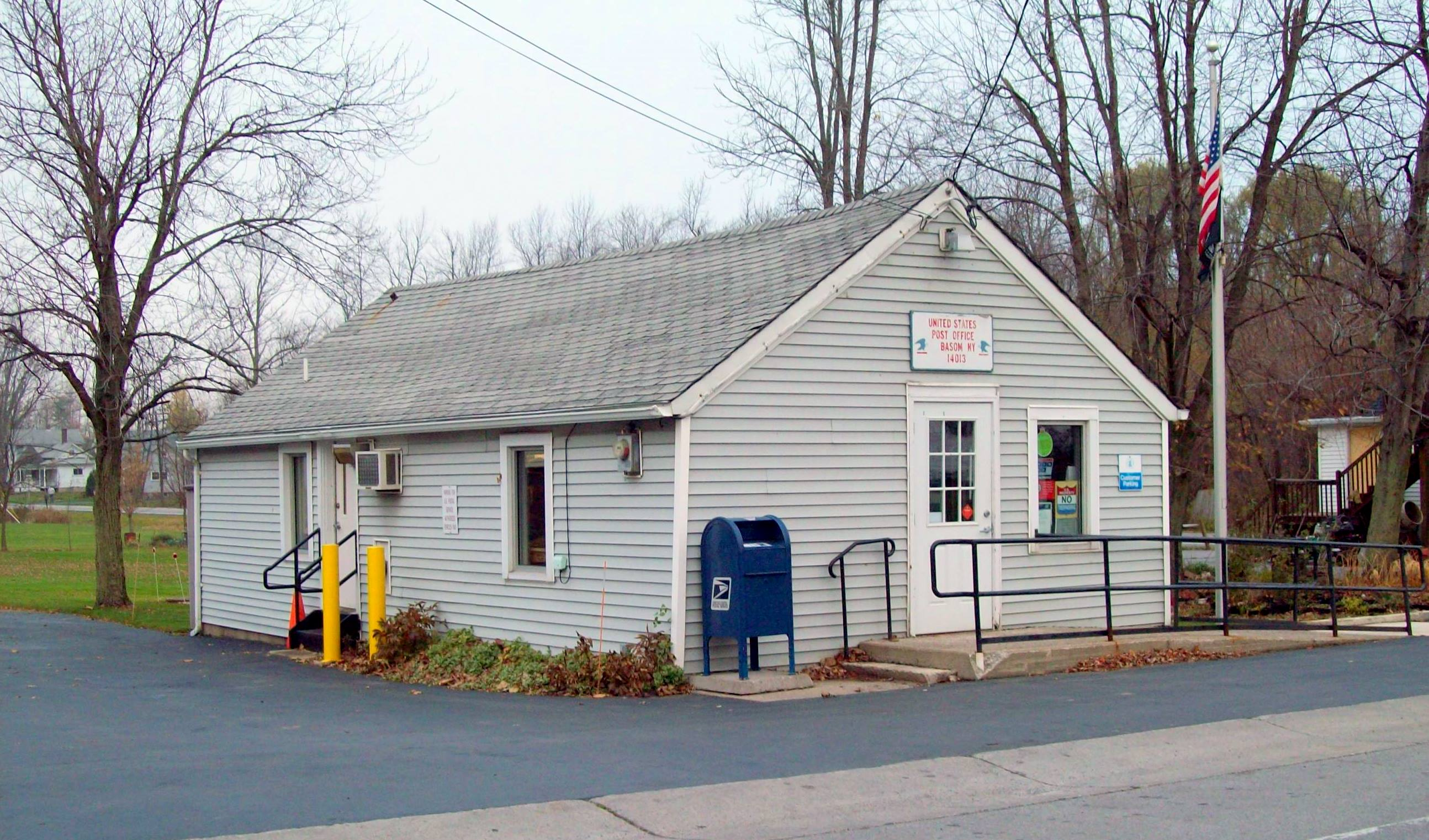
- Basom post office

- Location within New York Location within the United States
- Coordinates: 43°04′02″N 78°23′29″W
- Country: United States
- State: New York
- County: Genesee
- Elevation: 715 ft (218 m)
- Time zone: UTC-5 (Eastern (EST))
  - Summer (DST): UTC-4 (EDT)
- ZIP code: 14013
- Area code: 585
- GNIS feature ID: 943138

Basom is a hamlet in Genesee County, New York, United States. The community is located along New York State Route 77, 6.2 miles (10.0 km) east-northeast of Akron. Basom has a post office with ZIP code 14013, which opened on August 22, 1889.
