= Tonawanda Creek =

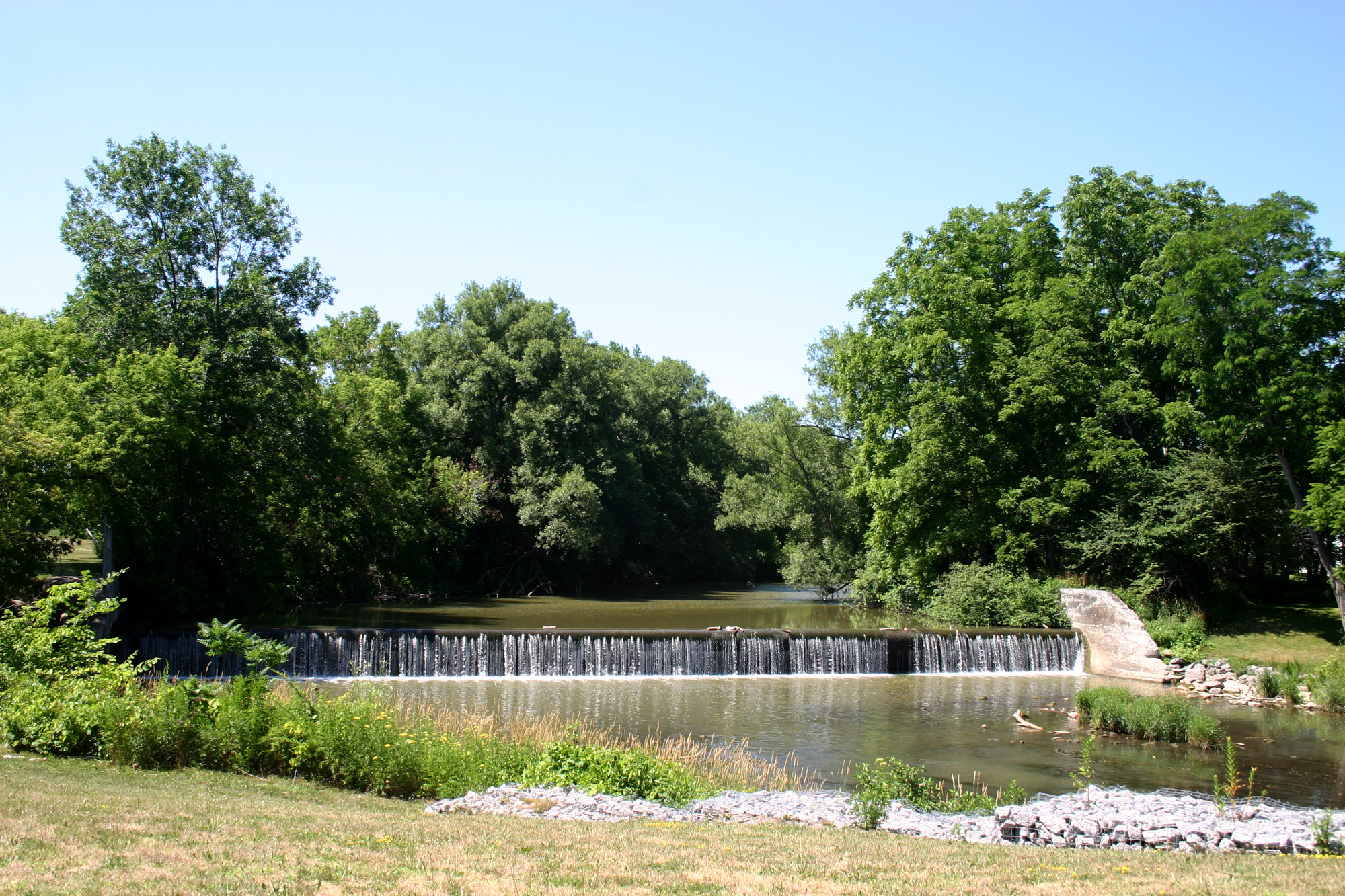
- Old mill dam at the Big Bend of Tonawanda Creek, downtown Batavia, New York

- Location of the mouth of the Tonawanda Creek in New York State Tonawanda Creek (the United States)

Location
- Country: United States
- State: New York
- Counties: Wyoming, Genesee, Erie, Niagara

Physical characteristics
- Source
  - location: Town of Java, Wyoming County
  - coordinates: 42°39′29″N 78°19′09″W
- Mouth: Niagara River
  - location: City of Tonawanda
  - coordinates: 43°01′25″N 78°52′54″W
- Length: 90 mi (140 km)
- Basin size: 650 sq mi (1,700 km^{2})

Basin features
- Progression: Niagara River→ Lake Ontario→ Saint Lawrence River→ Gulf of Saint Lawrence

Tonawanda Creek is a small tributary of the Niagara River in Western New York, United States. After rising in Wyoming County, the stream flows through Genesee County before forming part of the boundary between Erie County and Niagara County.

== Description ==
The length of Tonawanda Creek is 90 miles (140 km). Its drainage basin is nearly 650 square miles (1,700 km^{2}) in area. It flows on a meandering course for most of its length, first northerly until reaching the City of Batavia where a sweeping bend takes it westerly.

Tonawanda Creek rises in Wyoming County and enters the Niagara River between Niagara County and Erie County, forming a boundary between them. Tonawanda Creek passes through the Village of Attica, the City of Batavia, flows between the City of North Tonawanda to its north and the Town of Amherst to its south, the Town of Clarence, the Town of Tonawanda, and the City of Tonawanda. Just after being joined by Ellicott Creek, it enters the Niagara River.

The creek has a small 30-foot-high (9.1 m) waterfall at Indian Falls where the stream descends from the Onondaga Escarpment.

During the spring of each year, some sections of Tonawanda Creek flood to varying degrees. These floods are more of an inconvenience than a danger, but can be more serious, especially when ice jams dam up the water. The larger flooding can cause property damage.

Tonawanda Creek is also part of the Erie Canal, which joins the creek southwest of Lockport and allows canal traffic to proceed into the Niagara River. In its upper reaches, Tonawanda Creek and the Little Tonawanda, which is a tributary, are trout streams.

== History ==
The name Tonawanda (Ta:nöwöde’, also transcribed as Te-ni-wun-da or Ta-na-wan-deh') derives from the Seneca language meaning either literally "he is in the rapids there" or "swift water".

Tonawanda Creek flows through the ancient lake bed of Glacial Lake Tonawanda, a prehistoric lake that existed approximately 10,000 years ago at the end of the last ice age; many of the swamp lands surrounding Tonawanda Creek also date back to this lake.

Downstream of Indian Falls, Tonawanda Creek flows through the Tonawanda Indian Reservation, and this is where George Washington made a troop fording across the stream.

When the Erie Canal was first built, the Tonawanda Creek was the source of water for the western section of the Canal.

== See also ==
- List of New York rivers
