= Wende =

Wende may refer to:

- Die Wende (1989–1990), the historical period around German reunification
- Wende (album), a 1976 Ran Blake recording
- Wende horn, a runic symbol
- Wende Museum, a museum and educational institution in Culver City, California, United States
- Wende Station, a station on the Taipei Metro in Taiwan
- Wende–Bauckus syndrome or Pegum syndrome, a medical condition
- Wende, Alabama, an unincorporated community in Russell County, Alabama, United States
- Wende, New York, a hamlet in the town of Alden in Erie County, New York, United States
  - Wende Correctional Facility, a maximum security prison

== People ==
- Bruno Wende (1859–1929), American soldier who received the Medal of Honor
- Daisy Wende (1929–2025), Bolivian fashion designer
- Daniel Wende (born 1984), German figure skater
- Empress Wende or Empress Zhangsun, (601–636), of the Tang dynasty China
- František Wende (1904–1968), Czechoslovak skier
- Gottfried H. Wende (1852–1933), American politician from New York
- Horst Wende (1919–1996), German bandleader, arranger and composer
- Philipp Wende (born 1985), German rower
- Richard Vander Wende, American visual and video game designer
- Wende (singer) or Wende Snijders (born 1978), Dutch singer
- Wende Barker, Wyoming politician
- Wende Wagner (1941–1997), American actress

== See also ==
- Wenden (disambiguation)
- Wendi (disambiguation)
- Wends
- Wendy (disambiguation)
