= New York State Route 358 =

Former state highway in New York State

New York State Route 358
- Map of the Buffalo area with NY 358 highlighted in red, and Reference Route 954G in blue

Route information
- Maintained by NYSDOT and Erie County
- Length: 9.70 mi (15.61 km)
- Existed: 1930–April 1982

Major junctions
- South end: US 20A in Wales
- North end: US 20 in Alden

Location
- Country: United States
- State: New York
- Counties: Erie

Highway system
- New York Highways; Interstate; US; State; Reference; Parkways
| ← NY 357 | → NY 359 |

New York State Route 358 (NY 358) was a north–south state highway in Erie County, New York, in the United States. The southern terminus of the route was at an intersection with U.S. Route 20A (US 20A) in the hamlet of Wales Center within the town of Wales. Its northern terminus was at a junction with US 20 in the town of Alden. NY 358 mostly followed Two Rod Road; however, it was also routed on parts of Liberia and Four Rod roads.

NY 358 initially extended only from NY 354 to US 20 when it was assigned as part of the 1930 renumbering of state highways in New York. It was extended southward to Wales Center by 1935 over what had been originally part of NY 354. The NY 358 designation was removed in April 1982 and replaced with four different routes, including New York State Route 954G, an unsigned reference route.

== Route description ==
NY 358 began at US 20A (Big Tree Road) in Wales Center, a hamlet in the northern part of the town of Wales. The route headed north on Four Rod Road, briefly paralleling Buffalo Creek before turning north to exit the valley surrounding the creek. Upon emerging from the valley and entering the town of Marilla, NY 358 turned west onto Liberia Road and followed it to the creekside community of Porterville. In Porterville, the route met Two Rod Road. It turned north, following Two Rod Road out of Porterville.

North of Porterville, NY 358 intersected Jamison Road (County Route 574 or CR 574), once designated as NY 422. The route continued on through rural portions of Marilla to the hamlet of the same name, where it served as the primary north–south street in the community. Just north of Marilla, NY 358 intersected NY 354 (Clinton Street). The route continued onward into the town of Alden, where the amount of development along the highway began to increase. It crossed over Cayuga Creek, then ended shortly afterward at an intersection with US 20 (Broadway).

== History ==
In 1908, the New York State Legislature created Route 19, an unsigned legislative route extending from Buffalo to Batavia via Marilla and Wales Center. Route 19 entered Marilla on what is now Clinton Street and followed Two Rod, Liberia, and Four Rod Roads south to Wales Center, where it turned east onto Big Tree Road (now US 20A). The portion of legislative Route 19 northwest of Wales Center was not assigned a posted route designation until the 1930 renumbering of state highways in New York when it became part of NY 354. Also assigned at this time was NY 358, which was initially a short north–south connector between NY 354 in Marilla and NY 35 (now US 20) in Alden. NY 354 was rerouted c. 1935 to continue east on Clinton Street to NY 239 while NY 358 was extended southward to Wales Center over the former alignment of NY 354.

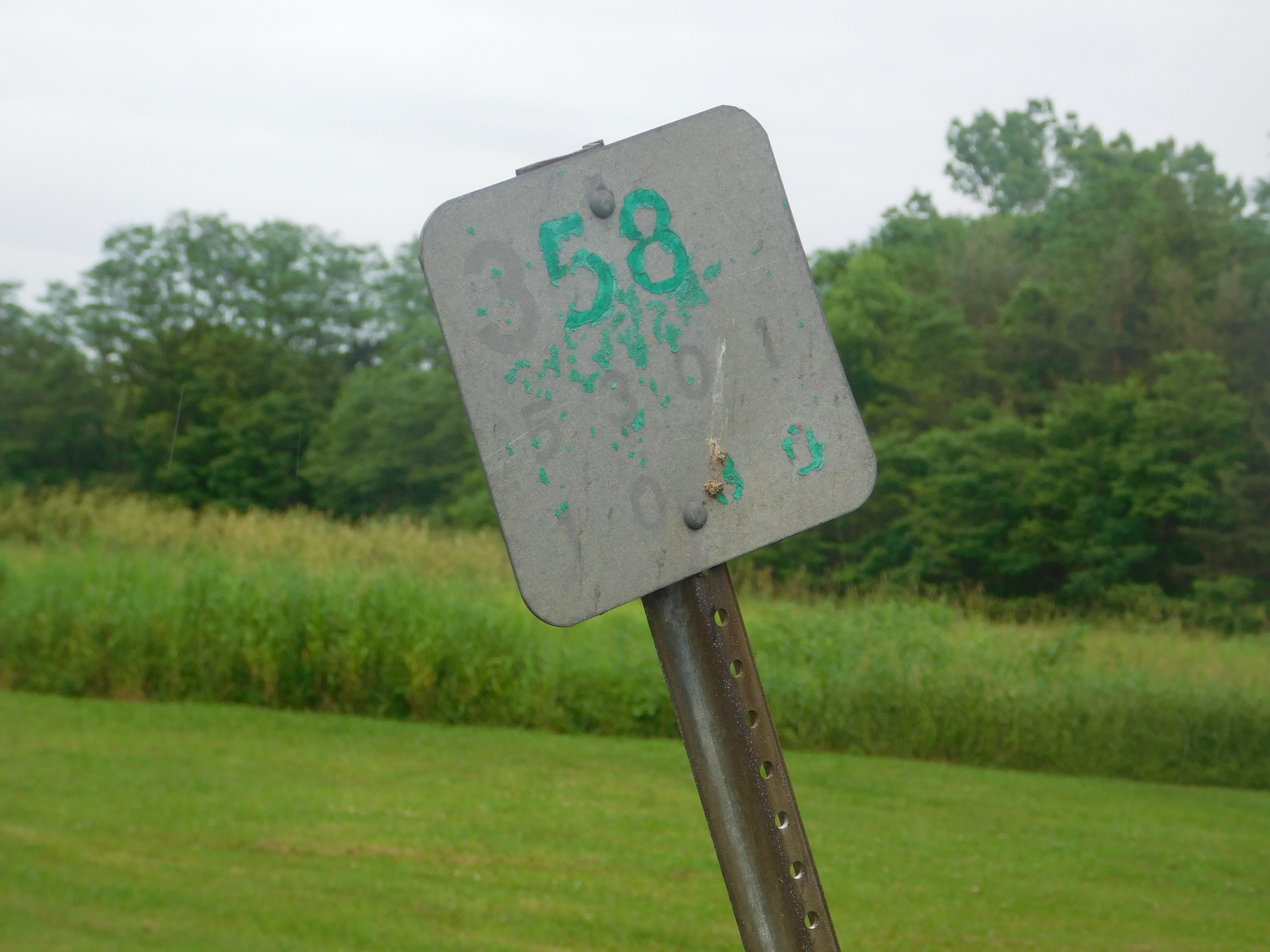
NY 358 reference marker that remains on Two Rod Road in Alden

Two sections of NY 358 were transferred from the state of New York to Erie County in the 1980s as part of two separate highway maintenance swaps between the two levels of government. On April 1, 1980, ownership and maintenance of the Liberia Road and Four Rod Road portions of NY 358 was transferred to the county as part of a larger swap. One of the highways transferred from Erie County to the state as part of the exchange was the portion of Two Rod Road south of Liberia Road. Under the terms of another swap, the segment of NY 358 north of NY 354 would be transferred to the county upon the completion of the Southern Expressway between Springville and Buffalo. The last section of the freeway, from Hamburg to Springville, was completed in the early 1980s. Even though all three roads were now county-maintained, NY 358 continued to extend north on Two Rod Road to US 20 and south on Liberia and Four Rod Roads to Wales Center.

NY 358 continued to exist until April 1982, when the designation was split into four other routes. The state-maintained portion of NY 358 on Two Rod Road became part of NY 954G, an unsigned reference route that continued south on the segment of Two Road Road transferred to the state in 1980 to meet US 20A west of Wales Center. Meanwhile, the county-maintained portions of the route on Two Rod, Liberia and Four Rod Roads retained their concurrent county route designations, namely CR 547, CR 402, and CR 356, respectively.

== Major intersections ==
The entire route was in Erie County.

| Location | mi | km | Destinations | Notes |
|---|---|---|---|---|
| Wales | 0.00 | 0.00 | US 20A (Big Tree Road) | Hamlet of Wales Center |
| Marilla | 3.62 | 5.83 | CR 574 (Jamison Road) | Former eastern terminus of NY 422 |
| Marilla | 7.15 | 11.51 | NY 354 (Clinton Street) | |
| Town of Alden | 9.70 | 15.61 | US 20 (Broadway) | |
1.000 mi = 1.609 km; 1.000 km = 0.621 mi
