= New York State Route 239 =

Former highway in New York

New York State Route 239
- Map of the Buffalo area with NY 239 highlighted in red

Route information
- Maintained by NYSDOT
- Length: 2.92 mi (4.70 km)
- Existed: 1930–September 25, 1980

Major junctions
- South end: NY 354 in Marilla
- North end: US 20 in Alden

Location
- Country: United States
- State: New York
- Counties: Erie

Highway system
- New York Highways; Interstate; US; State; Reference; Parkways
| ← NY 238 | → NY 240 |

New York State Route 239 (NY 239) was a state highway in eastern Erie County, New York, United States. The southern terminus of the route was at an intersection with NY 354 in Marilla. Its northern terminus was at a junction with U.S. Route 20 (US 20) in the village of Alden. NY 239 was about 3 miles (5 km) in length and named Exchange Street. When NY 239 was assigned as part of the 1930 renumbering of state highways in New York, it extended eastward to the Wyoming County village of Attica. NY 239 was truncated to Marilla in 1949 and removed from the state highway system completely in September 1980 as a result of a highway maintenance swap between the state of New York and Erie County earlier that year. The roadway is now County Route 578 (CR 578).

== Route description ==
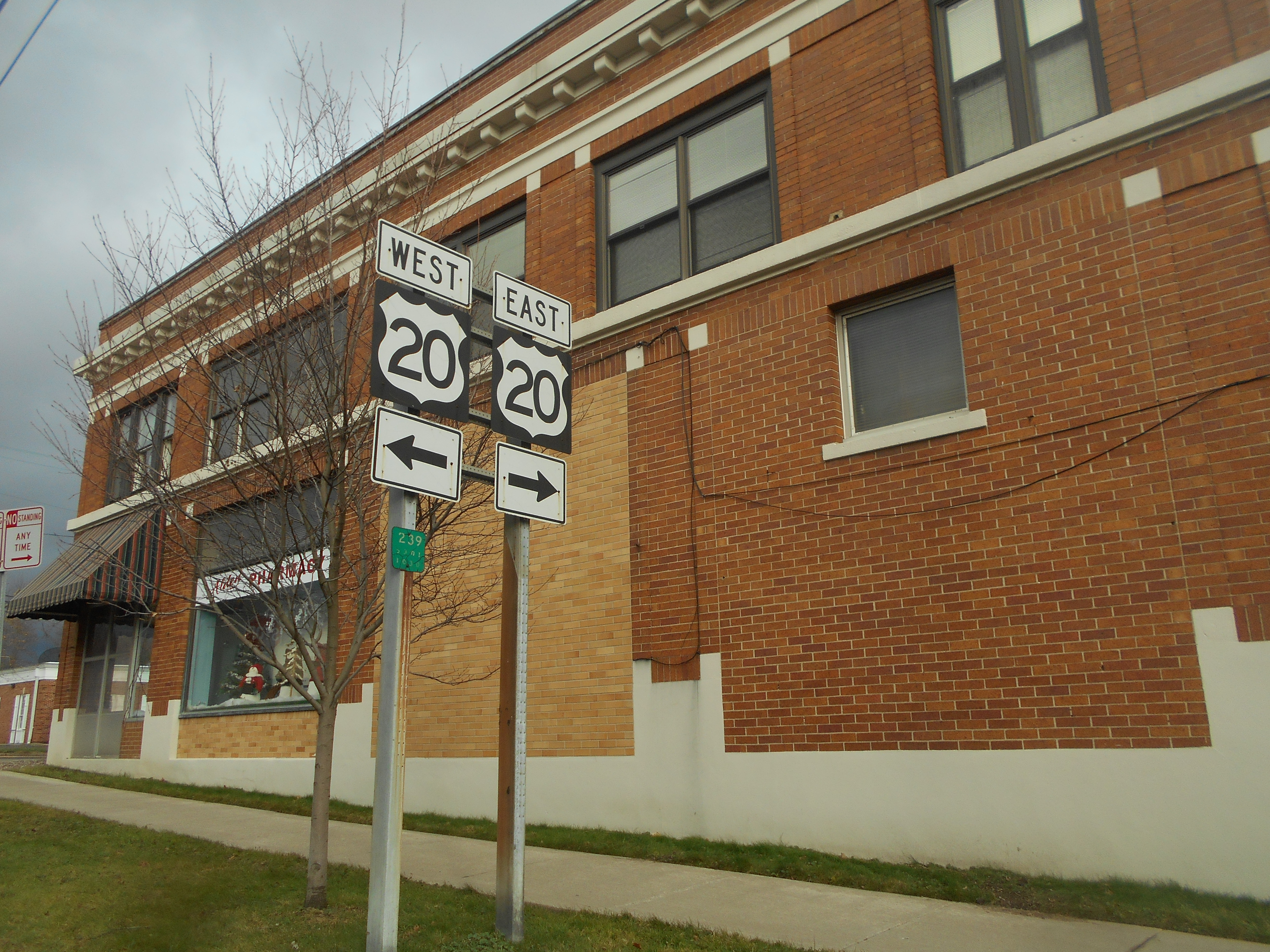
Northern terminus of NY 239 as it appeared in 2014. A reference marker for NY 239 is still posted below the sign assembly.

NY 239 began at an intersection with NY 354 just west of the Erie–Wyoming county line in the town of Marilla. The route then traveled to the northeast, climbing in elevation as it proceeded onward. It then made a turn to the north, descending in elevation. Running at about a height of 900 feet (270 m) above sea level, NY 239 crossed into the town of Alden and continued toward downtown. NY 239 continued northward, passing nearby Henskee Road, a connector between NY 239 and County Line Road, which ran parallel to NY 239 along the Erie–Genesee county line. The route dipped further in elevation, entering the village of Alden. Inside the village, it passed the Buffalo Water Filtration Plant to the west and crossed the Conrail-owned Southern Tier Line. NY 239 passed through a primarily residential area of the village just before terminating at US 20 in the village center.

== History ==
NY 239 as part of the 1930 renumbering of state highways in New York to an alignment extending from NY 35 in the village of Alden to NY 98 in the village of Attica by way of the hamlet of Cowlesville. The east–west road linking NY 239 near Cowlesville to Two Rod Road (then NY 358) north of Marilla was initially unnumbered. It became part of a realigned NY 354 c. 1935. NY 354 was extended eastward on January 1, 1949, over NY 239's alignment to a new terminus in Attica. As a result, NY 239 was truncated to its junction with NY 354 in the town of Marilla.

On April 1, 1980, ownership and maintenance of NY 239 was transferred from the state of New York to Erie County as part of a larger highway maintenance swap between the two levels of government. The NY 239 designation was removed on September 25 of that year. The highway is now designated by Erie County as CR 578.

== Major intersections ==
The entire route was in Erie County.

| Location | mi | km | Destinations | Notes |
|---|---|---|---|---|
| Marilla | 0.00 | 0.00 | NY 354 | |
| Village of Alden | 2.92 | 4.70 | US 20 | |
1.000 mi = 1.609 km; 1.000 km = 0.621 mi

== See also ==
- List of county routes in Erie County, New York (545–580)
