= Alden Advertiser =

Newspaper published in Alden

- Type: Weekly newspaper
- Owner(s): Leonard A. Weisbeck Jr
- Editor: Leonard A. Weisbeck Jr
- Founded: 1914
- Language: American English
- Headquarters: 13448 Broadway St. Alden, Erie County, New York
- Country: United States
- Circulation: appx. 3400
- Readership: Alden, Erie County
- OCLC number: 25104817
- Website: aldenadvertisernews.com

The Alden Advertiser is an American, English language newspaper serving Alden, Marilla, Darien and the surrounding communities of Erie County in New York. It paused publication on February 1, 2025. They are accepting serious inquiries regarding the purchase of the weekly newspaper.

Founded in 1914 as a weekly, the paper has a circulation of approximately 3,400. Leonard A. Weisbeck Jr. is the owner and editor of the paper.

== History ==
The paper was founded as a weekly by J. Childs. In 1917 the paper was bought by Leo Whitney, formerly of the Record. Whitney would run it until 1929.

In 1932 Joseph A Weisbeck took ownership of the paper. He died in 1962 and turned the paper over to his son Leonard. Weisbeck is former head of the Western New York Publishers Association.
