= New York State Route 354 =

Highway in New York

New York State Route 354
- Map of western New York with NY 354 highlighted in red

Route information
- Maintained by NYSDOT and the city of Buffalo
- Length: 31.70 mi (51.02 km)
- Existed: 1930–present

Major junctions
- West end: NY 5 in Buffalo
- US 62 in Buffalo; I-190 / New York Thruway in Buffalo; US 20 / NY 78 in West Seneca
- East end: NY 98 in Attica

Location
- Country: United States
- State: New York
- Counties: Erie, Wyoming

Highway system
- New York Highways; Interstate; US; State; Reference; Parkways
← NY 353	→ NY 355

New York State Route 354 (NY 354) is a state highway in New York in the United States. NY 354 is one of several highways radiating eastward from its western terminus in downtown Buffalo. The east terminus of NY 354 is in the village of Attica, where it ends at NY 98 and NY 238 as West Main Street. This highway runs through the center of Erie County to the northern county line of Wyoming County.

NY 354 is known as Clinton Street for the vast majority of its run. However, while Clinton Street continues to NY 5 in a straight line, NY 354 diverges for 1/2 mile (0.80 km), first north on Pine Street and then following William Street to its western terminus at NY 5. NY 354 also changes to West Main Street upon entering the village of Attica 0.7 miles (1.1 km) before its eastern terminus.

== Route description ==
NY 354 begins at an intersection with NY 5 (Ellicott Street) and Broadway Street in the city of Buffalo. Proceeding southeast along William Street, NY 354 runs as a two-lane commercial street through Jesse Clipper Square, passing numerous residences in the square. At the junction with Pine Street, the route turns southward for one block to Clinton Street, where it turns southeast on Clinton. Along Clinton Street, NY 354 becomes a two-lane residential street through the Ellicott section of Buffalo, crossing multiple residential complexes and buildings on both sides of the roadway. Just before Lord Street, the route crosses under railroad tracks and changes to a two-lane commercial and residential mix. Just after Filmore Avenue, the route crosses into the Babcock section of the city.

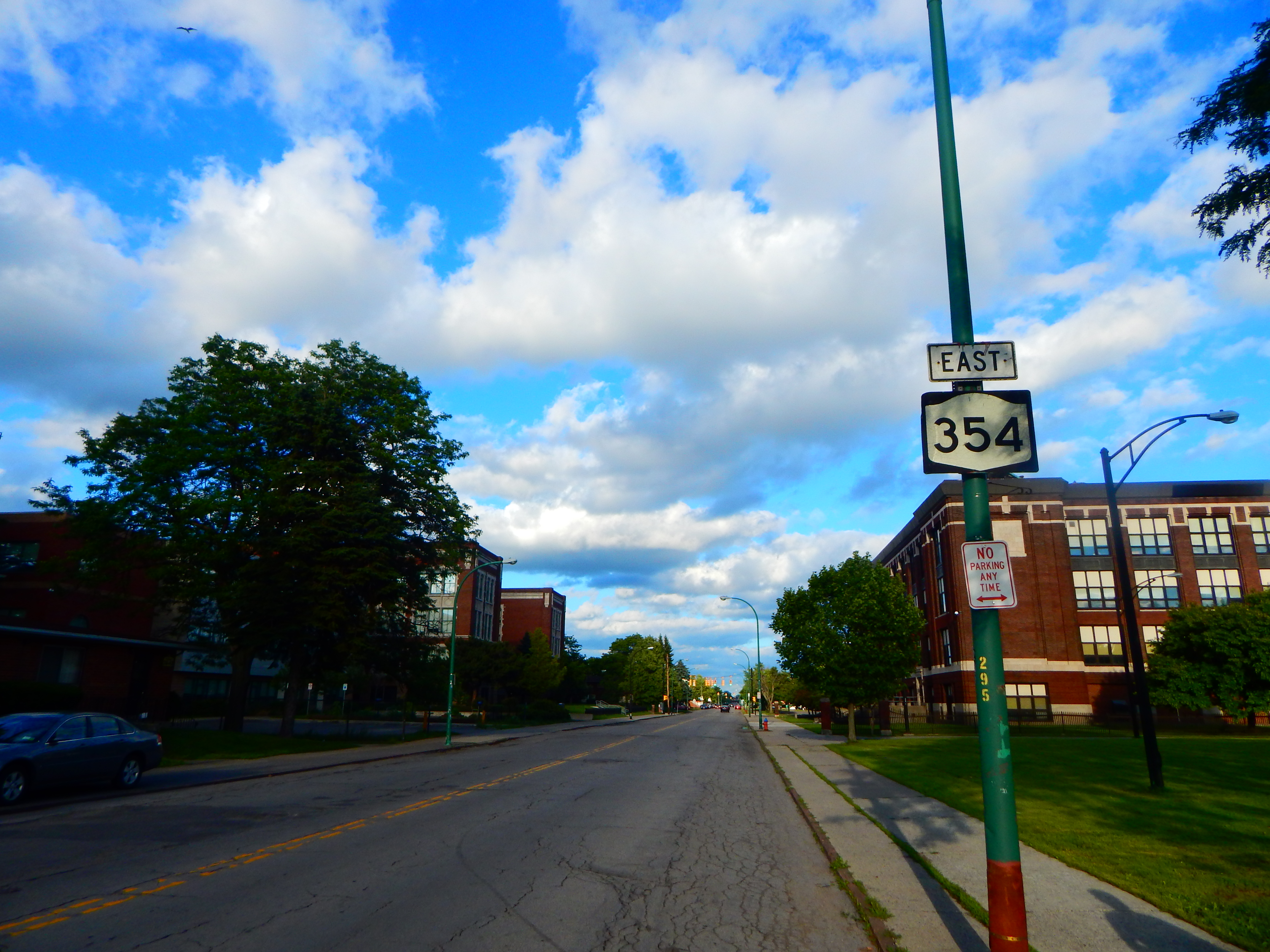
NY 354 along Clinton Street in Buffalo, with the first eastbound reassurance shield

Continuing southeast along Clinton Street, NY 354 remains a two-lane commercial and residential street before crossing into a more industrial area west of an intersection with US 62 (Bailey Avenue). Less than a block later, the route crosses under I-190 (the Niagara Thruway) and enters exit 2 via Cliff Street. Crossing east through Buffalo, NY 354 crosses east through a dense residential neighborhood of Kaisertown, paralleling I-190 through the city. The route crosses under the New York State Thruway (I-90) and soon intersects with NY 240 (Harlem Road) in the town of West Seneca. Turning southeast and crossing over Cayuga Creek, NY 354 crosses through a residential section of West Seneca, passing the entrance of St. Matthews Cemetery.

The route continues southeast through West Seneca, retaining the Clinton Street name through the town. Approaching Buffalo Creek, the route turns eastward and enters the hamlet of Gardenville, where NY 354 intersects with NY 277 (Union Road). Turning northeast into the hamlet of New Ebenezer, NY 354 continues into the town, running along Buffalo Creek as a two-lane residential street. Passing a local airstrip, the route crosses Borden Road (County Route 322) and bends along the creek into an intersection with US 20 and NY 78 (Transit Road). Paralleling to the south of Slate Bottom Creek, NY 354 crosses into the town of Elma east of Winspear Road (CR 328).

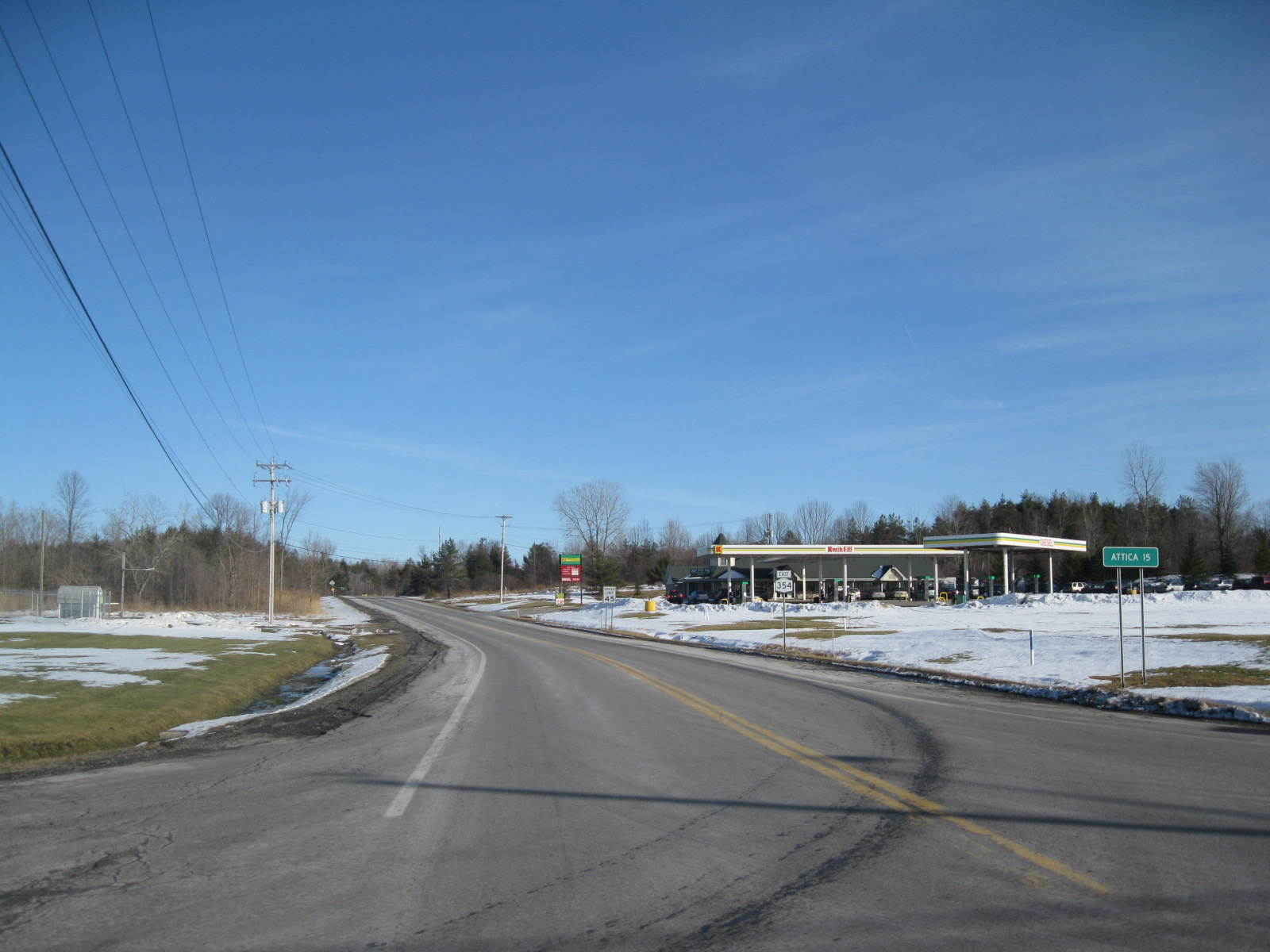
NY 354 eastbound in Marilla

Now in the town of Elma, NY 354 runs east through a less dense residential area and continues paralleling north of Buffalo Creek. Crossing into the town of Marilla, the route intersects with the southern terminus of CR 547 (Two Rod Road) and the northern terminus of NY 954G, an unsigned reference route. Continuing east through Marilla, the route remains a two-lane residential road for a distance. By the junction with Three Rod Road (CR 354), the route becomes a mix of rural and residential, crossing over Cayuga Creek once again. At Cayuga Creek Road (CR 527), the route turns southeast and parallels the creek into Wyoming County.

Now in the town of Bennington, NY 354 retains the Clinton Street moniker and the residential/rural mix surroundings that it had in Marilla. Near the junction with Cozy Road, the route crosses into the hamlet of Cowlesville, of which NY 354 serves as the main thoroughfare, passing numerous residences on both sides of the roadway. Winding southeast out of Cowlesville, the route continues to a junction with Folsomdale Road (CR 35), where it turns east to Burogh Road. At this junction, the route changes names to Clinton Street Road, soon entering the hamlet of Bennington Center. In Bennington Center, the route serves as the main west–east thoroughfare, crossing a junction with NY 77 (Alleghany Road) at the center of the hamlet.

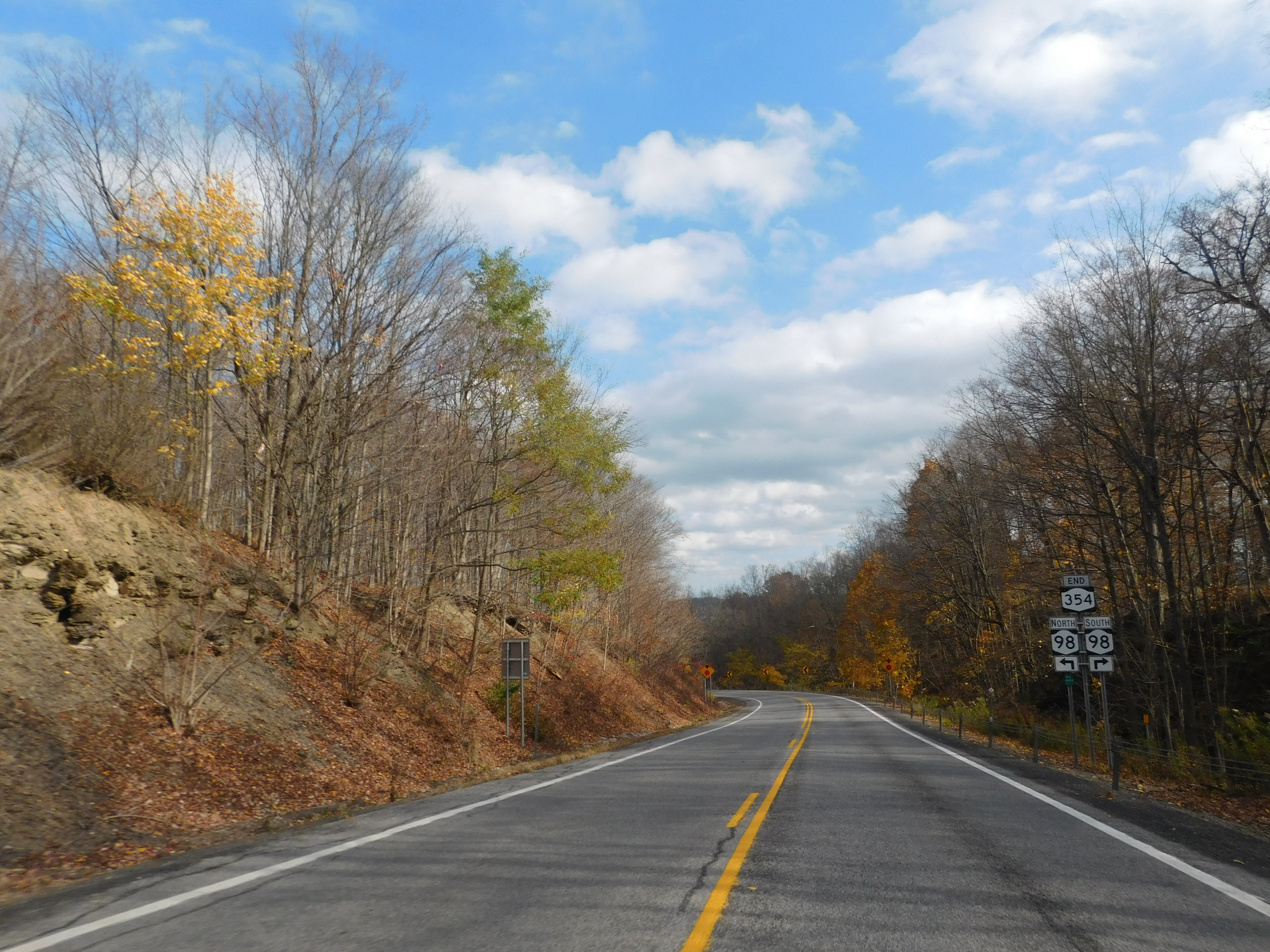
NY 354 eastbound approaching NY 98

NY 354 continues east out of Bennington Center, retaining the Clinton Street Road name as it crosses east through rural portions of the town of Bennington. The route crosses the northern terminus of French Road (CR 62) and begins to turn the northeast near an intersection with Maxon Road. The route remains rural for a distance, crossing through the hamlet of Danley Corners near Kriger Road and after a short distance to the northeast, the route crosses into the village of Attica. Now known as West Main Street, the route becomes residential in nature once again, passing multiple homes as it parallels the alignment of the Arcade and Attica Railroad. A short distance after turning eastward, NY 354 turns southward and intersects with NY 98 (High Street). This intersection marks the eastern terminus of NY 354, just south of NY 238 (Main Street).

== History ==
In 1908, the New York State Legislature created Route 19, an unsigned legislative route extending from Buffalo to Batavia via the hamlets of Marilla, Wales Center, and Varysburg. When the first set of posted routes in New York were assigned in 1924, no designation was assigned to the portion of legislative Route 19 between Buffalo and Marilla. It remained unnumbered until the 1930 renumbering of state highways in New York when it became part of NY 354, a route extending from downtown Buffalo to Wales Center via Marilla. At the time, the portion of modern NY 354 from Cowlesville to Attica was part of NY 239 while the Marilla–Cowlesville segment was unnumbered.

NY 354 was realigned c. 1935 to continue east along Clinton Street from Two Rod Road to Exchange Street, where it ended at NY 239. The former routing of NY 354 to Wales Center became part of an extended NY 358. NY 354 was extended eastward on January 1, 1949, over NY 239's alignment to a new terminus in Attica. As a result, NY 239 was truncated to its junction with NY 354 in the town of Marilla. NY 354 originally followed West Main Street in the village of Attica all the way to downtown at NY 98. Due to the presence of railroad tracks at its end, the eastern portion of West Main Street features both a sharp turn and a steep downgrade as it enters the village. A new highway bypassing this section of West Main Street, known as the "Attica–Bennington Highway", was built by 1949 as a realignment of NY 354.

== Major intersections ==
County	Location	mi	km	Destinations	Notes
Erie	Buffalo	0.00	0.00	NY 5 (Ellicott Street)	Western terminus
Erie	Buffalo	2.90	4.67	US 62 (Bailey Avenue)	
Erie	Buffalo	3.05	4.91	I-190 / New York Thruway to I-90 / New York Thruway - Erie, Albany, Niagara Falls, Toronto, Ontario, Canada	Exit 2 (I-190/Thruway)
Erie	Cheektowaga–West Seneca town line	4.48	7.21	NY 240 (Harlem Road)	
Erie	West Seneca	6.53	10.51	NY 277 (Union Road)	Hamlet of Gardenville
Erie	West Seneca–Elma town line	9.49	15.27	US 20 / NY 78 (Transit Road)	
Erie	Marilla	16.79	27.02	CR 547 north (Two Rod Road) / NY 954G south (Two Rod Road)	Northern terminus of NY 954G, southern terminus of CR 547, formerly NY 358
Erie	Marilla			CR 578 north (Exchange Street) – Alden	Southern terminus of CR 578, former southern terminus of NY 239
Wyoming	Bennington	25.32	40.75	NY 77 (Alleghany Street)	Hamlet of Bennington Center
Wyoming	Village of Attica	31.70	51.02	NY 98 (High Street)	Eastern terminus
1.000 mi = 1.609 km; 1.000 km = 0.621 mi
