= Wendy Weil =

Wendy Weil may refer to:

- Wendy Weil Rush (née Weil), widow of Stockton Rush of OceanGate Titan, U.S. businesswoman of OceanGate (as Rush)
- Wendy Weinberg Weil (née Weinberg), U.S. swimmer and physiotherapist

== See also ==
- Wendy (disambiguation)
- Weil (disambiguation)
