= Vincent Johnson =

American serial killer

- Mugshot of Johnson in August 2000
- Born: January 6, 1969 (age 57); Brooklyn, New York, U.S.
- Other names: "The Brooklyn Strangler" "The Williamsburg Strangler"
- Convictions: First degree murder Second degree murder (5 counts)
- Penalty: Life imprisonment without parole

Details
- Victims: 5–6
- Span of crimes: August 26, 1999 – June 7, 2000
- Country: United States
- State: New York
- Date apprehended: August 5, 2000
- Imprisoned at: Wende Correctional Facility, Alden, New York

Vincent Johnson (born January 6, 1969) is an American serial killer popularly known as The Brooklyn Strangler.

== Arrest ==
Between the summers of 1999 and 2000, a series of murders of prostitutes in the Williamsburg and Bedford-Stuyvesant neighborhoods of Brooklyn led police to arrest a Brooklyn homeless man, one of roughly 30 known associates of sex workers in the area detained for questioning, on suspicion of the murders. However, DNA testing definitively excluded the man as the killer.

After he was cleared as a suspect, the man befriended the officers of the Brooklyn North Homicide Task Force who were working on the Brooklyn Strangler case. He told them of another homeless man in the area, with whom he frequently used crack cocaine, who seemed fixated on sadomasochistic sex. The man was subsequently able to identify this suspect, Vincent Johnson, 5 ft 3 in (1.60 m) and 130 pounds (59 kg).

Johnson initially refused to provide a DNA sample to police, and denied knowing any of the women. However, one of the detectives had observed him spitting on the street, and Johnson's saliva was retrieved and given to the medical examiner for testing. Johnson's DNA matched that which was found on four of the victims.

Johnson later confessed to the murders of five women: Patricia Sullivan, Rhonda Tucker, Joanne Feliciano, Vivian Caraballo, and Laura Nusser, all of whom had arrest records for prostitution and drug offenses and were themselves addicts. He remained a suspect in the murder of Katrina Niles, although, as of 2006, he continues to deny involvement in her death. Police consider it likely he had sex with at least three of his victims.

Johnson reportedly claimed he was acting out of hatred for his mother. Three of the victims—Caraballo, Feliciano, and Sullivan—were killed on Thursdays, and Rhonda Tucker probably was as well, although her body was discovered on a Saturday. According to Johnson, this deliberate fixation came about due to his loathing of his mother's one day off from work, always a Thursday.

Johnson admitted few, if any, feelings of guilt. Of Patricia Sullivan, he said, "I didn't see strangling her as doing something wrong at the time," although after killing his first victim, Laura Nusser, he said he reported feeling "sorry" and wanting to apologize to her family.

Each of the victims was strangled, apparently with whatever ligature was at hand: two with their own shoelaces, one with a drawstring from a pair of sweatpants, two with electrical wire, and one with what was probably a discarded piece of cloth. Johnson bound their bodies with the ligatures but did not attempt to hide them. The women were left where they were killed, two on rooftops and one in a vacant lot in roughly the same vicinity in Williamsburg, two in apartments in Bedford-Stuyvesant, and one in a utility room under the Williamsburg Bridge, where Johnson was known to have slept occasionally on a cot.

Johnson is currently serving a life sentence without parole at Wende Correctional Facility in Alden, New York. He pleaded guilty to one count of first degree murder and five counts of second degree murder to avoid a possible death sentence.

== Other media ==
The pursuit of the Brooklyn Strangler and Johnson's subsequent arrest for the crimes were the subject of several episodes of the Court TV documentary series Brooklyn North.

== See also ==
- List of serial killers in the United States
