= Kendall Francois =

American serial killer (1971–2014)

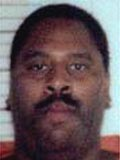
- Mugshot of Francois
- Born: July 26, 1971; Poughkeepsie, New York, U.S.
- Died: September 11, 2014 (aged 43); Wende Correctional Facility, Alden, New York, U.S.
- Other names: The Poughkeepsie Killer
- Status: Deceased
- Conviction: First degree murder (8 counts)
- Penalty: Life imprisonment without the possibility of parole

Details
- Victims: 8
- Span of crimes: October 1996 – August 26, 1998
- Country: United States
- State: New York
- Date apprehended: September 2, 1998

Kendall L. Francois (July 26, 1971 – September 11, 2014) was an American serial killer convicted of killing eight women in Poughkeepsie, New York, between 1996 and 1998.

== Early years ==
Francois was the second of four children born to Haitian parents. As a teenager, he wrestled and played football at Arlington High School. Upon graduation in 1989, he enlisted in the United States Army and completed basic training at Fort Sill. After four years in the Army, Francois was discharged due to obesity, as he weighed 320 pounds (145 kg) at 6 ft 4 in (192 cm). He returned to New York and enrolled at Dutchess Community College as a liberal arts major.

In 1994, while attending Dutchess Community College, Francois took a job as a school aide at Arlington Middle School, first as a part-time custodian and later as a student monitor from April 1996 to January 1997. His body odor earned him the nickname "Stinky" from students. Francois also behaved inappropriately with female students, including telling them sexual jokes, hugging them, and touching their hair. Francois left his job, claiming he was going to work at Anderson School, a special education institution for mentally disabled children in nearby Staatsburg, but the school did not confirm his hiring.

== Murders ==
Francois's first three victims were sex workers and repeat customers of his. They shared similar physical appearances: white, slight build, and dark hair. He picked up his first victim, 30-year-old Wendy Meyers, at the local Valley Rest Motel on October 24, 1996. During sex, Francois began choking her; once she fell unconscious, he drowned Meyers in a bathtub. A month later, on November 29, he killed 29-year-old Gina Barone in his car. Days later, he killed his third victim, Catherine "Cathy" Marsh, who was pregnant at the time. He placed all three bodies side by side in the attic of his home at 99 Fulton Avenue, where Francois lived with his parents and younger sister.

Marsh was not reported missing until March 7, 1997, by which time Francois had already killed his fourth and fifth victims, 47-year-old Kathleen Hurley and 29-year-old Mary Healey Giaccone. Giaccone was not reported missing until November 13, 1997. Poughkeepsie Police Department Detective Bill Siegrist began investigating with the Neighborhood Recovery Unit (the department's narcotics unit), where he learned that some of the Main Street prostitutes had complained about a local man (Francois) who was rough with them and violent during sex.

Detectives began surveilling Francois's home and had a wired prostitute meet with him. Little useful information was obtained; however, they noticed that Francois had a routine: in the mornings, he would use the family car to drive his mother to her place of work at a nearby psychiatric center, where she was a nurse, after which he would cruise the streets of downtown Poughkeepsie.

In early January 1998, Poughkeepsie police interviewed Francois about the missing women but gained no useful information. Later that month, he was arrested for assaulting a prostitute in his room after a dispute over money. Francois punched her in the face, knocking her onto the bed, then got on top of her and choked her with his bare hands. On May 5, he pleaded guilty to third-degree assault, a misdemeanor that resulted in a 15-day sentence.

In June 1998, Francois killed his sixth confirmed victim, 51-year-old Sandra Jean French. She was reported missing on June 12 in Dover, New York, and her car was found abandoned in Poughkeepsie, three blocks from the Francois home. On August 26, 25-year-old Catina Newmaster vanished. Like all of Francois's other victims, she was white, slight of build, with brown hair, and was last seen in downtown Poughkeepsie.

== Arrest ==
On September 1, 1998, Francois brought a woman named Christine Sala to his home. After she refused his sexual demands, he repeatedly punched and choked her while threatening to kill her.

Afterward, Sala convinced Francois to drive her back to Main Street, where he had picked her up. They got into his car and drove to a local Sunoco station, but just before pulling in, Sala jumped from the car and ran away. Detectives Skip Mannain and Bob McCready were in the area distributing flyers about Catina Newmaster's disappearance. A witness, Deborah Lownsdale, approached their unmarked police car and reported that a woman had been assaulted. The detectives located Sala, who confirmed the attack. She was brought to the police station, where she filed a complaint against Francois.

Police returned to Francois's home that day to speak with him about his attack on Sala. He agreed to go to police department headquarters to discuss the report. Over the next few hours, Francois made numerous admissions regarding the disappearance of the women. He was arrested and charged with a single count of murder in the death of Catina Newmaster. A search warrant was obtained, and shortly afterward a team of detectives, the district attorney, EMS crews, crime scene processors and police officers entered the Francois home at 99 Fulton Avenue.

Police reports described the interior of the house as filled with garbage, rotting food, and broken furniture. The odor was severe enough that investigators required anti-putrefaction masks to enter.

One of the bodies discovered in the house was 34-year-old Audrey Pugliese, who had not been reported missing, bringing the confirmed death toll to eight.

== Trial and sentencing ==
On September 9, 1998, Francois entered a plea of "not guilty" before Judge Thomas J. Dolan in Dutchess County Court. In his next appearance on October 13, he was formally charged with eight counts of first-degree murder, eight counts of second-degree murder and one count of attempted assault. Francois pleaded not guilty and laughed when the families of the victims heckled him in court.

On December 23, Francois's lawyer attempted to enter a guilty plea before District Attorney William V. Grady could formally file his intent to seek the death penalty. Judge Dolan initially declined to allow Francois to enter such a plea. The defense team appealed the decision to the State Court of Appeals, which ruled to allow the guilty plea.

Francois showed no emotion during the proceedings and later commented that "killing seemed easier than getting into a relationship." On August 7, 2000, Francois was sentenced to life in prison without the possibility of parole after pleading guilty to eight counts of first-degree murder and eight counts of second-degree murder. The plea agreement allowed him to avoid a possible death sentence.

Francois was incarcerated in Attica Correctional Facility until shortly before his death. He died at Wende Correctional Facility on September 11, 2014, at the age of 43. The official cause of death was an AIDS-related illness, a diagnosis that had been revealed at his trial in 2000.

== Victims ==
Name	Age	Date of death
Wendy Meyers	30	c. October 1996
Gina Barone	29	c. November 1996
Catherine Marsh	31	c. November 1996
Kathleen Hurley	47	c. January 1997
Mary Healey Giaccone	29	c. February 1997
Sandra Jean French	51	c. June 1998
Audrey Pugliese	34	c. August 1998
Catina Newmaster	25	c. August 1998

On October 9, 1997, 27-year-old African American sex worker Michelle Eason was reported missing in Poughkeepsie. She too was last seen in the downtown area. Though he admitted to knowing her, Francois denied killing her, and he was never charged in her disappearance. Her case remains unsolved.

== See also ==
- List of serial killers in the United States
