= Wendi =

Wendi may refer to:

- Wendi, a variant spelling of the given name Wendy
- Wendi Richter (born 1960), American occupational therapist and wrestler
- Emperor Wen (disambiguation), several Chinese emperors
- Wendi (town) (文地镇), a township-level division in Bobai County, Guangxi, China
- Wind ENergy Data & Information (WENDI) Gateway, a digital library for wind energy-related data and information
- Venti (Chinese: 温迪, Pinyin: Wēndí), a Genshin Impact character

== See also ==
- Wends, a historical name for Slavs living near Germanic settlement areas
- Wende (disambiguation)
- Wenden (disambiguation)
- Wendy (disambiguation)
