= Winden =

Winden may refer to:

== Germany ==
- Winden im Elztal, in the district of Emmendingen, Baden-Württemberg
- Winden, Aichach-Friedberg, in the district of Aichach-Friedberg, Schwaben, Bayern
- Winden, Germersheim, in the district of Germersheim, Rhineland-Palatinate
- Winden, Rhein-Lahn, in the district Rhein-Lahn-Kreis, Rhineland-Palatinate

== Elsewhere ==
- Winden am See, in Burgenland, Austria

== Fiction ==
- Winden, a fictional town in the German Netflix series Dark

== See also ==
- Wenden (disambiguation)
