= Marilla (hamlet), New York =

Hamlet in New York, United States

Coordinates: 42°50′24″N 78°33′18″W

Marilla is a hamlet in the town of Marilla in Erie County, New York, United States.
