= Doreen Taylor =

American singer-songwriter

- Born: Doreen Taylor; Alden, New York
- Genres: Adult contemporary, pop
- Occupations: Singer, songwriter, Broadway performer
- Website: www.doreentaylormusic.com

Doreen Taylor is an American adult contemporary, pop singer, songwriter, Broadway performer, and actress.

Her debut EP, Unbreakable, was released in 2007. A follow-up LP album, Taylor Made Hits, was released in 2008. She released a special multi-media album called Coming Home which benefited the American troops. Her first original country solo album Magic was released worldwide on April 11, 2012. Her single Colors of the USA benefiting the National Parks Conservation Association was released on April 11, 2014. She released her single, "TOY", nationwide on June 23, 2015, which reached the top 50 of the Billboard Hot 100 and No. 31 on the Adult Contemporary chart. In 2016, she released her adult contemporary album Happily Ever After. She made her Off-Broadway debut in 2017 in An Enchanted Evening: A Night with Oscar Hammerstein and returned to the Off-Broadway stage in March 2019 in the original musical, Sincerely, Oscar. In 2019, she returned to performing her original music in a new acoustic show titled My Favorite Things and in 2020, during the height of the Covid global pandemic, she released a new album, Doreen Taylor LIVE that sold out online in the first 4 days of its release.

== Early life and education ==
Taylor was born in Alden, New York. She began performing professionally at a young age. One of her earliest performances in which she was featured was with The Spirit of Youth, an international singing and dancing tour group.

During her years at Alden High School, Taylor was active in theater. After graduating from high school, she attended the Hartt School of Music in Hartford, Connecticut, where she received vocal training and graduated with honors and a bachelor's degree in Vocal Performance.

While continuing to pursue the art of music, she received her Master of Music degree in Opera Performance from Temple University in Philadelphia.

== Career ==
=== Early stage ===
In addition to numerous leading operatic roles in many opera companies throughout the United States, Taylor has had lead roles in two Broadway national tour groups. A few of her musical theater company credits throughout the United States include "Cunegonde" in Candide, "Christine" in The Phantom of the Opera, "Mother" in Ragtime, "Magnolia" in Show Boat, and "Laurie" in Oklahoma!.

=== One-woman show ===
In early 2009, Taylor developed a one-woman stage act and performed it along the Eastern seaboard, including several key cities in New York, Pennsylvania, New Jersey, Maryland, and Virginia. The one-woman act was signed to perform Friday and Saturday nights for ten weeks at the Trump Taj Mahal in Atlantic City, New Jersey, from July 3 to September 5, 2009, where she received glowing reviews and gained national recognition.

=== Post One-woman show ===
In 2010, Taylor was cast as an entertainment talk-show host in her own infomercial-style 30-minute internet show. The short-lived, 2-episode web series Taylor Made featured various guests in the entertainment industry and was a charitable venture through the Wish Upon A Hero organization and Wishtv.com.

Taylor was selected in 2010 as one of Philadelphia's top 5 "Alpha Women" alongside successful entrepreneur Lindy Snider (the daughter of Ed Snider the owner of the Philadelphia Flyers and former owner of the Philadelphia 76ers) and anchorwoman and Emmy Award-winning journalist Tracy Davidson.

Doreen was featured on the cover of the October 3, 2012, issue of Steppin' Out, the No. 1 entertainment magazine in New York City and New Jersey. Doreen was also featured on the cover of the international entertainment magazine in the December 2013 issue of Moshnews. Subsequently, in December 2013, Taylor came on board as the celebrity music columnist for Moshnews. Each month, Taylor interacts with fans via her Facebook page in a question and answer scenario; a more modern "Dear Abby" format. She then picks three or four questions to answer in print in the "Taylor's Tune" monthly column.

=== 2013/14 National "Magic" tour ===
Taylor launched her first headline tour (her 2013/14 "Magic" tour in support of her solo debut album Magic) on May 23, 2013, at the World Cafe Live in Philadelphia. Following that, she subsequently appeared in cities from Los Angeles, New York City, Buffalo and three times in Philadelphia. The finale show was held at the historic Theater of Living Arts on January 24, 2014, which benefited the charity UrbanPromise.

=== Celebrity Endorsements ===
In 2014, Taylor was selected as a celebrity face for Hades Footwear and in 2016, she was the celebrity face for Failte Vodka. She was involved in national ad campaigns for both brands. Taylor has also been an active advocate for charitable organizations like Boys & Girls Clubs of America, National Parks Conservation Association, GLAAD and St. Jude's.

=== 2017 Return to Musical Theatre/ Off Broadway ===
In 2017, Doreen Taylor created and produced her first ever full scale, theatrical production. The new docu-musical "An Enchanted Evening: A Night With Oscar Hammerstein" premiered at the Bristol Riverside Theatre on August 24. The show was sold out which prompted a 2-week, limited engagement Off Broadway run at the 777 Theatre in New York City. The production starred both Taylor and musical theatre veteran, Davis Gaines (Phantom of the Opera) December 8–17, 2017.

=== SINCERELY, OSCAR: The Musical ===
After a sold out debut in Philadelphia, Pennsylvania, and an Off Broadway run in December 2017, "An Enchanted Evening: A Night With Oscar Hammerstein II" was rebranded as "SINCERELY, OSCAR" and returned to Off Broadway in a full production remount opening in March 2019 and running for 52 performances at the Acorn Theatre in NYC. Taylor not only starred, but also created and co-produced the show.

== Other accomplishments ==
Taylor is a former beauty queen title holder and has performed the National Anthem for the Philadelphia Phantoms of the American Hockey League, the NHL's New York Islanders and Boston Bruins, and the Buffalo Bisons, a minor league baseball team.

She modeled for the 32-page collection of recreations of famous pin-up girls of the 1940s, emulating such classics like Betty Grable, Lana Turner, Veronica Lake, Ava Gardner and Marilyn Monroe. Along with the book, Doreen recorded 19 of the most well-known songs from the World War II era to accompany the book. Included songs are "I'll Be Seeing You" and "I Got Rhythm". Doreen teamed up with the Special Operations Warrior Foundation, a nonprofit that supports more than 60,000 Army, Navy, Air Force, and Marine Corps special operations personnel and their families. 20% of the proceeds would be donated to the charity from the sale of the book and CD. Columnist, Kris Midgett of Strum Magazine described the new book and CD as "sensual and elegant".

In early 2014, Doreen Taylor was selected to write and perform the national tribute "Colors of the USA" to benefit the National Parks Conservation Association in honor of the US national parks' and National Park Service's 100th anniversary. Taylor performed the world premiere at the Salute to the Parks Gala in Washington, D.C., on April 9, 2014. The song was available for download to the general public at midnight, April 11, 2014, via the Official "Colors of the USA" website, and the official East Coast single release party was to be held in Philadelphia on April 22, 2014 and the west coast release party was held in Los Angeles on May 15, 2014. A percentage of the proceeds benefits the NPCA.

On July 16, 2014 the National Parks Conservation Association held a press conference in front of Independence National Historical Park in Philadelphia, Pennsylvania to publicly announce that award-winning country recording artist, Doreen Taylor has been awarded the title of the "Ambassador to the National Parks" for her inspirational work connecting new generations to the US national parks. As a champion to this cause, Taylor was selected by the National Parks Conservation Association to create a new song "Colors of the USA" honoring the national parks which has brought new audiences and inspired others to join the cause. 50% from every download is being donated to the NPCA to help preserve and protect these treasures for future generations.

=== Honors and awards ===
Taylor was awarded the 2012 Suggested Artist Songwriting Award for her song "Music's My Magic", from her album Magic, by the Song of the Year Songwriting Competition.

She was named Artist of the Week by Amped Sounds Magazine for the week of August 27 – September 3, 2012, for her critically acclaimed version of "Summertime" from Porgy and Bess on her album Magic.

Taylor was selected as the Spot-On Country Artist of the Week by the website Spotlight Country on October 8, 2012.

Taylor's adult contemporary single TOY (released June 2015) charted on Billboard's Hot 100 and reached No. 31 on the Adult Contemporary Chart after receiving heavy airplay on radio stations nationwide.

She was awarded the 2016 Inspiration Award from the Boys & Girls Club of Camden County.

== Discography ==
=== Albums ===
- Taylor Made Hits (2008)
- Coming Home (2010)
- Magic (2012)
- TOY (2015) single
- Happily Ever After (2016)
- Doreen Taylor LIVE (2020)

=== Music videos ===
- "Last Call (for the alcohol)" (2012)
- "Heartbeat" (2012)
- "Summertime" (2012)
- "Judgment Day" (2012)
- "Colors of the USA" (2014)
- "My Christmas Wish (2015)
- "Over" (2017)
- "Unstoppable" (2017)
