= Roswell F. Cottrell =

American preacher

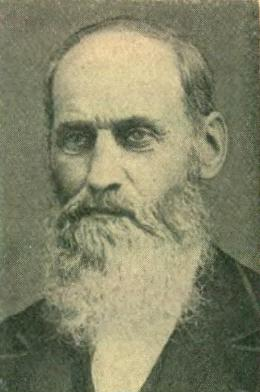
- Roswell Fenner Cottrell
- Born: January 17, 1814; Brookfield, New York
- Died: March 22, 1892 (aged 78); Ridgeway, New York
- Occupations: Minister/Preacher, Writer and Poet.
- Spouse: Catherine Harvey

Roswell Fenner Cottrell (January 17, 1814 – March 22, 1892) was a preacher, counselor, writer, hymnist and poet who came from a family of Seventh Day Baptists. He was the son of John Cottrell (1774–1857) and Mary Polly Stillman (1779–1852) After joining the sabbatarian Adventists who eventually organized the Seventh-day Adventist Church, he became one of their leading advocates.

== The Cottrells of Rhode Island and their Seventh Day Baptist Heritage ==
The Cottrell family come from a long line of Seventh Day Baptists. The family traces their sabbatarian roots back to the Seventh Day Baptists of seventeenth century England or even earlier.

=== 1638, Nicholas Cottrell Arrives at Newport, Rhode Island ===
Nicholas Cottrell arrived from England to locate in Rhode Island. He was one of a company who purchased land in Westerly and vicinity. The records reveal that his descendants settled in Westerly and that this settlement became the principal center of the Seventh Day Baptist Church in New England.

=== 1774-1852, John Cottrell ===
Rosswell's father, John Cottrell, was born 1774 in Westerly, Rhode Island. He was a Seventh Day Baptist preacher. But he did not agree with the Baptist teaching on the immortality of the soul. He owned and worked a small farm woodware shop. These activities provided a source of income. He was not paid as a preacher. Along the intervening years several prominent members of the Cottrell family have become Seventh Day Baptist preachers.

James White visited John Cottrell in 1853 at Mill Grove, New York. He reported the meeting in the Review and Herald:

"Bro. Cottrell is nearly eighty years of age, remembers the dark day of 1780, and has been a Sabbath-keeper more than thirty years. He was formerly united with the Seventh-Day Baptists; but on some points of doctrine has differed from that body. He rejected the doctrine of the trinity, also the doctrine of man's consciousness between death and the resurrection, and the punishment of the wicked in eternal consciousness. He believed that the wicked would be destroyed. Bro. Cottrell buried his wife not long since, who, it is said, was one of the excellent of the earth. Not long since, this aged pilgrim received a letter from friends in Wisconsin, purporting to be from M. Cottrell, his wife, who sleeps in Jesus. But he, believing that the dead know not anything, was prepared to reject at once the heresy that the spirits of the dead, knowing everything, come back and converse with the living. Thus truth is a staff in his old age. He has three sons in Mill Grove, who, with their families are Sabbath-keepers."

=== Calvert B. Cottrell ===
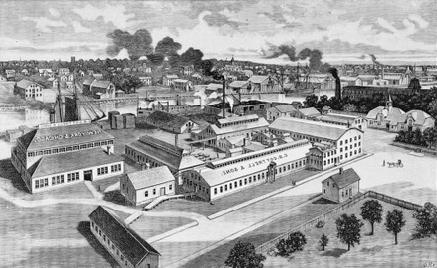
Cottrell Press Manufacturing, 1889. Seventh Day Baptist Calvert B. Cottrell closed his business on the Sabbath in the early days of his business.

Calvert B. Cottrell established a printing press manufacturing plant in Westerly. He practiced the Seventh Day Baptist faith and never operated on Saturdays in those early years. The branch of the Cottrell family living in Westerly, Rhode Island, have been observers of the Seventh-day Sabbath for more than three centuries.

== Brookfield and Mill Grove, New York ==
John Cottrell and family moved to New York and lived for many years in Brookfield. In 1833 he moved his family again. This time they settled at the hamlet of Mill Grove, some twenty miles east of Buffalo.

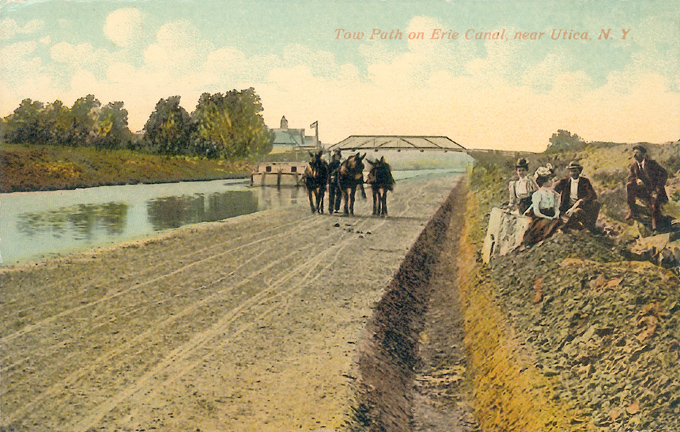
Erie Canal Tow Path at Utica north of Brookfield.

Roswell, at 19 years of age, accompanied his parents to Mill Grove. They travelled much of the way on the then newly constructed Erie Canal. Roswell helped drive the team of horses along the towpath. At Mill Grove, Roswell married Catherine Harvey. He taught in the public schools for ten years.

Soon after arriving at Mill Grove, he was one of those who witnessed the notable meteoric shower of November 13, 1833. With his father and other members of the family, Roswell was deeply interested in the message of William Miller, but did not identify himself with it, believing that when God would herald His second coming, the messengers would be observers of the seventh-day Sabbath.

John Cottrell spent the remainder of his life at Mill Grove. In 1851, one year before his death, he became a Seventh-day Adventist.

== Joins with Sabbatarian Adventists ==
In 1851, the Roswell Cottrell family became Seventh-Day Adventists. Soon after accepting the message of Christ's imminent return, he entered the gospel ministry, devoting his full-time to preaching and writing, and for a time serving as president of the New York Conference. For 41 years up to the time of his death in 1892, R. F. Cottrell supported the Seventh-day Adventist denomination.

=== Earliest Known Published Sermon by a Sabbatarian Adventist ===
The May 14, 1857, issue of the Review and Herald contains the earliest extant record of a sabbatarian Adventist sermon. Roswell F. Cottrell preached it to the Seneca Indians. This is also the earliest record of a Sabbath-keeping Adventists sharing his faith with members of an American Indian tribe.

On February 2, 1857, R. F. Cottrell reported to the Review and Herald that he and William Ingraham had visited the Seneca Indian Reservation on Tonawanda Creek, located about 10 miles from Cottrell's home. Both Cottrell and Ingraham preached, through an interpreter, at the reservation's small Baptist church of fifty members. In the June 10, 1858 Review and Herald, a second sermon by Cottrell entitled "A Discourse Written for the Seneca Indians, to be delivered through an Interpreter, No. 2" was published.

In reporting on the meetings, Elder Cottrell wrote:

"We gave two lectures through an interpreter in their chapel. They manifested much interest. Their elder and deacon, and those among them who can read English seemed anxious to read, and we distributed some of our tracts among them gratuitously. Some said they believed from the signs that the coming of the Lord was near." [Review and Herald, February 12, 1857, p. 117]

=== The Review and Herald and Other Church Journals ===
After the office of the Review and Herald was moved to Battle Creek, Michigan, in 1855, he served for a time as a member of the paper's editorial committee along with J. N. Andrews and Uriah Smith. From that year onward, Cottrell was a regular contributor to the Review. He wrote close to 1700 articles for church papers over a period of 40 years.

The Review and Herald grew considerably over its first two decades of operation. In the Review of Nov. 25, 1873, it was reported that the net earnings of the office for several months had been about $1000 per month. This made it possible to purchase another press, a Cottrell and Babcock cylinder — weighing 14,675 lbs., at a cost of $3400.

The Youth Instructor

James White asked Cottrell to develop and present a series of youth Sabbath School lessons. These were published in the Youth's Instructor in 1854 and 1855.

=== As an Evangelist ===
Early Adventist evangelists used tents to conduct their meetings. For example, during the summer of 1856 tents were used in Wisconsin, Michigan, New England, and in the State of New York. In New York, Cottrell's home state, he and evangelist Ingraham assisted Loughborough in such tent meetings. These tent meetings brought considerable success with new people joining the movement. In the States of New York and Pennsylvania, there was not much money available. During haying and harvesting time, Loughborough's team worked in the fields four and one half days each week. Their evangelistic pay amounted to two dollars per weekend. They conducted meetings on both Sabbath and Sunday. Including what they had earned in farm labor, Ingraham and Loughborough earned four dollars per week. Cottrell was paid three dollars per week for acting as tent-master and speaking occasionally.

=== Cottrell and Adventist Colleagues ===
Rhodes

Cottrell became an Adventist as a result of Rhodes' evangelistic efforts.

Loughborough

During the later 1850s Cottrell worked with Loughborough in New York evangelistic campaigns.

James White

James White appreciated Cottrell's ability to explain things clearly. This is especially evident in his comments about Cottrell's help in writing a series of Sabbath School lessons for the Youth's Instructor in 1854 and 1855. But White and Cottrell did not always see matters the same way. They disagreed regarding church organization and the holding of property insurance. James White requested that those who disagreed with a proposed plan, provide a clearly stated alternate plan. Roswell Cottrell spoke from specific principles which James White challenged. White wanted clear Bible statements for guidance. He challenged Cottrell to give as much Biblical support for his ideas on church organization as he had done for his powerful Sabbath essays. The public nature of the dispute between these two leaders provides a window into how disputes came to be resolved; i.e. through frank examination of assumptions.

The dispute, though public, remained civilized. Both men kept the bigger picture of church advancement in their focus. These disagreements, for James White, seemed to be a source of stress and worry.

Ellen White

Cottrell witnessed Ellen White's visionary ministry regarding the "Messenger Party". The disruptive activities of this group concerned Loughborough and others. They weren't sure what to do. Any confrontation seemed to make the situation worse. On the evening of June 20, 1855, James and Ellen White, Cottrell, and Loughborough met for a prayer meeting at a church member's home. At this meeting Ellen White had a vision. Afterwards, she related that the Adventist workers should preach the truth as they knew it and not confront the opposing group. This would result in their opponents turning against themselves. Her counsel proved correct and the Adventist movement continued to grow.

John Nevins Andrews

Andrews and Cottrell shared similarly views regarding church organization. They believed that the Christian Church should use the early church record to define their efforts to organize the church. They understood this to put most of the responsibility on the local church for ownership and administration of Gospel work.

Uriah Smith

Cottrell, Uriah Smith and J.N. Andrews comprised the Review and Herald's publishing committee in the mid-1850s. By 1860, Smith served as resident editor at Battle Creek, Michigan, while others, such as Cottrell, wrote to Smith and reported on their experiences.

Dudley M. Canright

In 1858, Cottrell lived in Ridgeway, New York. Dudley Canright, as a young man, came to Cottrell's home. As they associated together there on the Cottrell farm, planting corn together and sharing the responsibilities of the farm, Canright accepted the Adventist message. Cottrell baptized him. Canright later came back as a church worker and reported his fond memories of those earlier days.

=== At the Time of His Death ===
Cottrell died at 78 years of age in 1892. S. H. Lane reported that the entire denomination had become familiar with his initials "R. F. C." and that his poetry has been read and sung with delight everywhere. According to Lane, Cottrell was a 'superlative' writer. Right up to the time, Cottrell studied his Bible and wrote both prose and poetry. The last night of his life, with a pencil and tablet, he wrote nearly all night and up to the time he died. At the time of his funeral, neighbors and friends, Adventists and otherwise, remembered him as a true Christian; a person true to his faith and to his church.

=== Spicer Looks Back ===
Elder William A. Spicer, writing in the "Review & Herald" of 1951, paid this tribute to the memory of "our pioneer, Eld. Cottrell:

"He had been a tireless evangelist. He had served a period as president of the N.Y. Conference. He endeared himself to us young people at the old headquarters in Michigan as chaplain of the Battle Creek Sanitarium. He gave us hymns we loved to sing. The first hymn our missionaries translated for China's non-Christian people was Elder Cottrell's hymn of creation; "The God that made the earth, and all the worlds on high."

== Theology ==
=== Doctrine of God ===
The Trinity

Many early sabbatarian Adventists did not believe in the trinitarian concept as taught by mainline churches. Roswell Cottrell seems to have been okay with the trinitarian idea but was ambivalent about it.

=== Doctrine of Man ===
Non-immortality of the Soul

Roswell Cottrell and his father did not agree with their Seventh Day Baptist associates on the immortality of the soul.

=== The Doctrine of Salvation ===
Cottrell's poetry reveals his concepts of salvation:

The Wonders of Redeeming Love

The wonders of redeeming love
Our highest thoughts exceed;
The Son of God comes from above
For sinful man to bleed.

He gives Himself, His life, His all,
A sinless sacrifice,
For man He drains the cup of gall,
For man the Victim dies.

And now before His Father's face
His precious blood He pleads;
For those who seek
the throne of grace,
His love still intercedes.

He knows the frailties of our frame,
For He has borne our grief;
Our great High Priest
once felt the same,
And He can send relief.

His love will not be satisfied,
Till He in glory sees
The faithful ones for whom He died
From sin forever free.

=== The Doctrine of the Church ===
Church Organization

Although R. F. Cottrell did not favor any formal organization of the denomination when such was first discussed in 1860, in the end he accepted it. Throughout the remainder of his life he was an active worker for the church mostly in the states of New York and Pennsylvania.

Authority of Local Church Leaders

Seventh Day Baptists tend to be congregationalists. As a former Seventh Day Baptist, Cottrell believed that the traveling leaders should enable the congregation's leadership to serve their local group in most matters of church governance. This included ordaining officers, administering the ordinances of the Lord's Supper, baptizing new believers, receiving them into membership and being a pillar and support of the truth.

=== The Doctrine of the Christian Life ===
The Sanctuary in Heaven Reveals God's Law

Of the centrality of the sanctuary in Sabbatarian belief, Roswell F Cottrell wrote in 1863: "We find, not only that the sanctuary is the grand centre of the Christian system, as the earthly was of the typical, but that this subject is the centre and citadel of present truth. And since our temple is in heaven, and in that temple, 'the ark of the testament.' containing 'the commandments of God,' and in the midst of these commandments, the Sabbath of the Lord, fenced around by nine moral precepts that can- not be overthrown, it is no wonder that the enemies of the Sabbath should, not only strive to abolish the Ten Commandments, but to abolish the true sanctuary in which they are deposited."

Should Christians Fight

In 1865, Cottrell wrote a series of three articles for the Review and Herald in which he gives reasons why Christians should not fight.

Should Christians Vote

Cottrell opposed voting because the United States was prophesied to make an image to the beast.

Health Reform

Cottrell took the Adventist principles of health reform seriously. He tried them himself and then advocated them to others.

Property and Life Insurance

Cottrell took a strong stand against Christians depending on insurance. James White, as editor and leader of the sabbatarian Adventists, encouraged the publishing of the various views on the subject. As people presented their Biblical reasons, their motto was "Truth shall stand."

Disagreeing as Christians

Cottrell joined the sabbatarian Adventists as a strong-minded independent Christian. His family took a stand for the non-immortality of the soul with their Seventh Day Baptist associates. In the development of the sabbatarian Adventists, differences arose regarding legal organization and the holding of property. Cottrell differed with James White on some key points. His June 5 letter in the Review and Herald illustrates his leadership model. He begins his letter, "I did not wish to throw any obstacles in the way of the advancement of the truth in saying what I did in regard to a name, insurance, &c. I should be very sorry to wound the cause I love." He held strong views but did not want those views to interfere with the bigger picture. He expressed a humble, conciliatory approach by using phrases such as, "Perhaps I have had an undue prejudice...", "I may be wrong in this. If so, I do not want my opinions to be in the way of any...", "Perhaps this is error...", and "If I have spoken wrong, I hope that the right will prevail..." Cottrell considered it his duty to speak on matters, giving biblical reasons for his views. It was his duty to do so. Afterwards, he could write, "Having done my duty, I submit to the judgment of the church. My prayer is that the Lord will give his servants wisdom; and I believe he will.

=== The Doctrine of Last Things ===
The Three Angels Messages Fulfilled Chronogically

Early sabbatarian Adventists, including R. F. Cottrell, taught that the messages of the three angels of Revelation 14 came one after the other chronologically. Cottrell wrote, "Do you say you do not believe that the second and third messages have been announced ? It is a historical fact that they have. How came you to believe that Persia, Greece and Rome were the kingdoms that were to succeed Babylon, the first of the series in Daniel's prophecy? It is simply because they came as predicted. Well, that is the way to believe the prophecy of the three messages..."

Sunday-keeping and the Mark of the Beast

Cottrell was one of the first Adventists to link Sunday-keeping and the Mark of the Beast.

The gift of prophecy expected in the last days.

Cottrell taught that God will provide the church with the prophetic gift in the last days.

Literal and Exact

Early Adventists examined carefully the meaning of each word in a prophecy. Then they applied their logical skills to derive their conclusions. The prophecy for the last days mentions every freeman and every bondman. From this Cottrell, and others, concluded that slavery would exist up to the end of time. To fight against slavery was to fight against the inevitable fulfillment of prophecy.

== Poet and Hymn Writer ==
Elder Cottrell wrote a number of poems through the years that were published in the Review and Herald. In addition, he wrote several hymns, two of which are included in the current Seventh-day Adventist Hymnal. His poetry is playful and thought-provoking.

Titles for Cottrell's poems

1. As drowsy earth is dreaming still
2. As time rolls on amid earth's gloom
3. Behold God's own exalted Son
4. Blessed are they henceforth that die
5. By living faith we now can see
6. Cheer up, ye soldiers of the cross
7. Delightful day, best gift of heaven
8. Erected high in heaven stands
9. God loved the world, the ruined world
10. Here through a wilderness of sorrow

11. Holy Sabbath, sacred rest
12. O lift up your heads, your redemption draws news
13. O perfect law of the Most High! Law ever holy, just, and good!
14. O solemn thought, and can it be
15. There is a house in heaven built
16. The God that made the earth and all the worlds
17. The time is near when Zion's sons
18. The wonders of redeeming love our highest thoughts exceed
19. 'Twas wondrous depth of heavenly love
20. It's Jewish.

== Progeny ==
=== 1878-1970 Roy Franklin Cottrell ===
Roswell's grandson, Roy, was born at Ridgeway, New York, in 1878. He graduated from Mount Vernon Academy in Ohio and Pacific Union College in California. After a period of service as pastor-evangelist, he became Bible teacher at the South Lancaster Academy. In 1908, he and his wife Myrtie accepted a call to mission service in China, where they worked for twelve years to 1920.

While in China, he travelled extensively. He baptized hundreds of native converts, and wrote numerous tracts and booklets in the Mandarin language. He prepared the first subscription book, HERALDS OF THE KING, used by Seventh-day Adventist colporters in China.

Since 1920, Roy lived in southern California where he worked as a pastor in Glendale, Santa Monica, Long Beach, Huntington Park and Los Angeles. He wrote for various religious journals, prepared eight series of international senior Sabbath School lessons, and for a considerable time conducted a weekly column entitled "The Newspaper Pulpit" which appeared in the three leading metropolitan papers of Los Angeles. He authored twenty-five books and booklets, ten in the Chinese language and fifteen in English. He retired from active pastoral service in 1950 and lived in Escondido, California. Roy Franklin Cottrell died in 1970.

=== 1912-2003 Raymond Forrest Cottrell ===
Raymond Cottrell, the great-grandson of Roswell Fenner Cottrell and nephew of Roy Franklin Cottrell, was born in Glendale, Calif., in 1912. He is a graduate of La Sierra Academy and received his B.A, and :M.A, degrees from Pacific Union College.

After his marriage to Elizabeth Landis of Phoenix, Ariz., and a period of service as teacher, evangelist and pastor, he was called to mission endeavor in Manchuria, China, where he labored for seven years. Returning to America, he taught in the Bible departments of Lodi Academy, Pacific Union Academy and Pacific Union College.

In 1952, Mr. Cottrell accented the invitation to connect with the Review and Herald Publishing Association as Associate Editor in the production of the seven-volume Seventh-Day Adventist Bible Commentary, On completion of that monumental project, he became Associate Editor of the "Review & Herald'.

(Raymond F. Cottrell died in 2003) http://mytreewebsite.com/cccottrell/cottrellbooklet-18.html

== See also ==
- Seventh-day Adventist Church
- Seventh-day Adventist theology
- Seventh-day Adventist eschatology
- Millerites
- William Miller (preacher)
- History of the Seventh-day Adventist Church
- 28 fundamental beliefs
- Questions on Doctrine
- Teachings of Ellen White
- Inspiration of Ellen White
- Prophecy in the Seventh-day Adventist Church
- Investigative judgment
- The Pillars of Adventism
- Second Advent
- Baptism by Immersion
- Conditional Immortality
- Historicism
- Three Angels' Messages
- End times
- Sabbath in Seventh-day Adventism
- Ellen G. White
- Adventist
- Seventh-day Adventist Church Pioneers
- Seventh-day Adventist worship
- Seventh Day Baptists
