= Wendy (disambiguation) =

Wendy is a given name.

Wendy may also refer to:

== People ==
- Thomas Wendy (died 1560), royal physician to King Henry VIII of England and Member of Parliament
- Thomas Wendy (MP) (1614–1673), English politician and Member of Parliament
- Wendy (singer) (born 1994), Korean singer Son Seung-wan, member of the South Korean girl group Red Velvet

== Arts and entertainment ==
- "Wendy" (The Beach Boys song), 1964
- "Wendy" (Delta-V song), 2026
- "Wendy", a song by Maisie Peters from The Good Witch, 2023
- "Wendy", a song from the 1954 Broadway musical Peter Pan
- Wendy (TV series), a German animated children's series
- The Wendy Williams Show (TV series), a U.S. talk show, known by its logo as "Wendy"
- Wendy (film), a 2020 American drama film, also based on Peter Pan
- Wendy Wu: Homecoming Warrior, a 2006 Disney Channel Original Movie

== Other uses ==
- Wendy, Cambridgeshire, England, UK; a hamlet
- Wendy's, a North American chain of fast-food restaurants
- USS Wendy (SP-448), a United States Navy patrol vessel in commission from 1917 to 1918
- List of storms named Wendy

== See also ==
- Wendy house, a toy house
- Wendi (disambiguation)
- Wends, a historical name for Slavs living near Germanic settlement areas
- Wende (disambiguation)
- Wenden (disambiguation)
