= West Alden, New York =

Hamlet in New York, United States

Coordinates: 42°53′30″N 78°31′24″W

West Alden is a small hamlet in the town of Alden in Erie County, New York, United States.
