= Alden Center, New York =

Hamlet in the state of New York, United States

- Hamlet
- Location in New York Alden Center (the United States)
- Coordinates: 42°54′40″N 78°31′24″W
- Country: United States
- State: New York
- County: Erie
- Town: Alden
- Elevation: 827 ft (252 m)
- Time zone: UTC-5 (Eastern (EST))
  - Summer (DST): UTC-4 (EDT)
- ZIP code: 14004
- Area code: 716
- GNIS feature ID: 942256

Alden Center is a small hamlet in the town of Alden in Erie County, New York, United States.
