= Porterville, New York =

Hamlet in Erie County, New York, US

Coordinates: 42°47′25″N 78°33′13″W

Porterville is a hamlet in the town of Marilla in Erie County, New York, United States.
