= New York State Route 238 =

State highway in western New York, US

New York State Route 238
- Map of western New York with NY 238 highlighted in red

Route information
- Maintained by NYSDOT
- Length: 15.22 mi (24.49 km)
- Existed: 1930–present

Major junctions
- South end: US 20A in Orangeville
- North end: US 20 in Darien

Location
- Country: United States
- State: New York
- Counties: Wyoming, Genesee

Highway system
- New York Highways; Interstate; US; State; Reference; Parkways
← NY 237	→ NY 239

New York State Route 238 (NY 238) is a 15.22-mile (24.49 km) state highway located in Western New York in the United States. It runs in a northwest–southeast direction roughly centered on the village of Attica. In the former direction, it connects to U.S. Route 20 (US 20) in Darien and serves as a more direct route into eastern Erie County. In the latter, it links to US 20A in Orangeville and is the most direct route between Attica and Warsaw, the county seat of Wyoming County. NY 238 was assigned in the 1930 renumbering of state highways in New York as an Orangeville–Attica highway and extended northwest to Darien by the following year.

== Route description ==
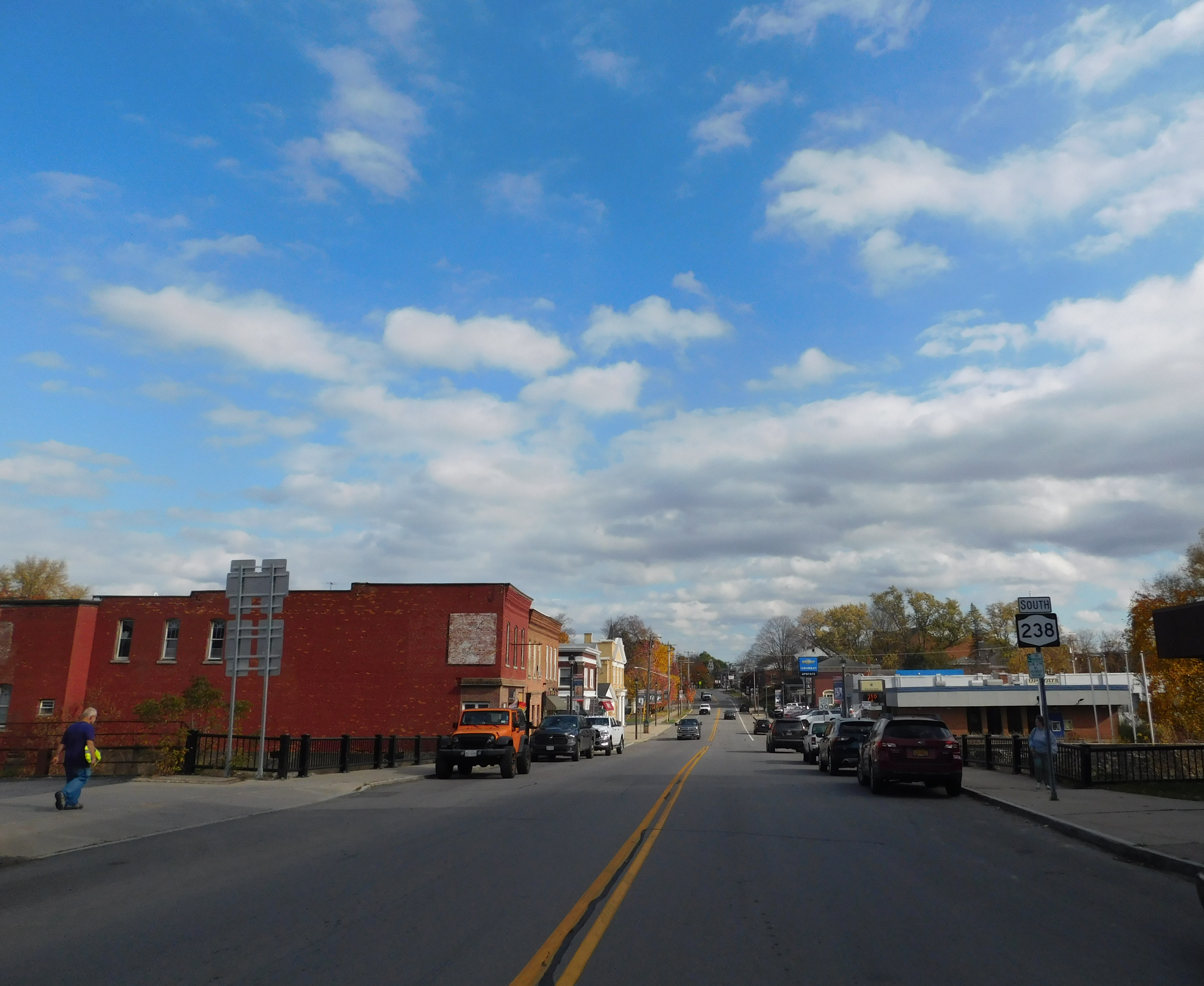
NY 238 in Attica village

NY 238 begins at an intersection with US 20A in an area of the town of Orangeville known as Halls Corner. It heads north as Halls Corners Road, passing through sparsely populated areas of the town and serving Dream Lake Campground, located east of NY 238 on Buffalo Road. At Buffalo Road, the route makes a slight turn to the northwest and enters the town of Attica. Across the town line, NY 238 passes by one of Attica's reservoirs on its way to the small hamlet of Attica Center, where the route encounters the southern terminus of County Route 42 (CR 42) and the eastern terminus of CR 39. Outside of Attica Center, NY 238 winds its way northward toward the village of Attica, passing the eastern edge of the Attica and Wyoming Correctional Facilities—more prominently the work farm operated by the facilities.

Just outside the Attica village limits, NY 238 turns west, taking over East Main Street from CR 19 at a junction adjacent to the Attica Central Middle and High Schools. NY 238 continues west into Attica, initially passing quietly through mostly residential areas of the village. It soon enters the business district, where it connects with the northern terminus of CR 31 (Exchange Street). After three more blocks, the route descends into the Tonawanda Creek basin and meets with NY 98 at High Street. NY 238 turns north here, overlapping with NY 98 along Market Street for 0.3 miles (0.5 km) to Buffalo Street, where NY 238 turns northwest to follow Buffalo Street out of the village and into Genesee County. Across the county line, NY 238 cuts across the southwestern corner of the town of Alexander on its way into the town of Darien. It closely follows the Norfolk Southern Railway's Southern Tier Line through this mostly rural area, and CR 45 follows a parallel routing to NY 238 on the opposite side of the tracks through much of the area. CR 45 leaves NY 238 just outside Attica, and rejoins the state route about 2 miles (3.2 km) later in Darien. As a result, one road which used to cross the tracks in this area—CR 36—has been cut in half, eliminating the requirement to maintain its grade crossing. After CR 45's western terminus, NY 238 turns more northward again, entering a residential area and terminating at a junction with US 20 in the hamlet of Darien.

== History ==
NY 238 was assigned as part of the 1930 renumbering of state highways in New York to the portion of its modern alignment between Orangeville and Attica. It was extended northwest to Darien by the following year. The portion of NY 238 between Attica and Darien originally followed Attica Road (modern CR 45), crossing what is now known as the Southern Tier Line twice. NY 238 was moved onto its current, more northerly alignment by 1978, avoiding the railroad tracks entirely.

== Major intersections ==
County	Location	mi	km	Destinations	Notes
Wyoming	Orangeville	0.00	0.00	US 20A (Hermitage Road) / CR 4 – Warsaw, Varysburg	Southern terminus; northern terminus of CR 4; hamlet of Halls Corner
Wyoming	Village of Attica	10.77	17.33	NY 98 south to NY 354	Southern terminus of NY 98 / NY 238 overlap
Wyoming	Village of Attica	11.07	17.82	NY 98 north	Northern terminus of NY 98 / NY 238 overlap
Genesee	Darien	15.22	24.49	US 20 – Buffalo, Alexander	Northern terminus; hamlet of Darien
1.000 mi = 1.609 km; 1.000 km = 0.621 mi: Concurrency terminus
