= UrbanPromise =

- Company type: Non-governmental organization
- Founded: 1988
- Headquarters: Camden, New Jersey
- Founder: Bruce Main
- Website: www.urbanpromiseusa.org

UrbanPromise is a Christian non-profit youth organization in Camden, New Jersey. Established in 1988 by Dr. Bruce Douglas Main and his wife Pamela Burgess Main, UrbanPromise has spawned similar programs elsewhere in the United States, Canada, Africa and the Caribbean.

UrbanPromise in Camden provides youth educational and developmental programming. These include an alternative high school, an elementary/middle school, after-school programs, summer camps, teen job training, boat building, environmental and experiential learning.

UrbanPromise operates the UrbanPromise Academy high school and the UrbanPromise elementary and middle school in Camden.

== History ==
UrbanPromise was founded in 1988 by Bruce Main and his wife, Pamela Burgess Main, in the basement of an unused Baptist church. It began with just a few adult staff, 12 college-aged missionary volunteers, and an annual budget of only $12,000.

UrbanPromise began as a spin-off of the Evangelical Association for the Promotion of Education. It was inspired by founder Dr. Tony Campolo and then Executive Director Reverend John Carlson,.

== Description ==
UrbanPromise now has a budget of $3.6 million, employs more than 50 full-time staff, and serves 600 local youth and families annually. UrbanPromise also engages 500 volunteers annually: 50 college interns, 350 work group individuals, and around 100 local residents.

Many UrbanPromiseemployees and volunteers are UrbanPromise graduates who have returned to Camden to serve their community. The staff work with a group of 50 college-aged interns who commit one to two years to community service in Camden. These interns work with local teens in UrbanPromise's AfterSchool Programs and Summer Camps; teens are employed as counselors, tutors, and mentors through the organization's StreetLeader program.

== Scope ==
Programming at UrbanPromise is scheduled during the time when youth are most at risk of involvement in crime and violence — between 3 and 9 PM. Children and teens receive mentoring; community service; life skills classes; tutoring; SAT/ACT prep courses; classes in reading, writing, and math; groups focused on social development; and performing and visual arts.

UrbanPromise's two schools serve many youth and children who have dropped out of public school or who have been involved in the juvenile justice system. In 2011, UrbanPromise's elementary and middle school saw 98% attendance; and 100% percent of UrbanPromise Academy 2011 and 2012 seniors graduated on time. Of UrbanPromise's 2012 graduating class, 98% have gone on to pursue post-secondary education. Historically, UrbanPromise graduates have had an 85% college completion rate.

UrbanPromise also provides experiential learning activities through its UrbanTrekkers program in nature settings and in diverse communities throughout the United States and abroad. Since 2009, UrbanPromise has taught wooden boat-building to Camden youth through their Urban BoatWorks program. As of 2019, they have built 47 boats.

== International replication ==
UrbanPromise sites within the United States include Charlotte, NC, Wilmington, DE, Miami, FL, Trenton, NJ, Little Rock, AR, and Birmingham, AL. These sites provide services annually to 457 children and youth in after school programs. There were 827 in attendance among 14 summer camps offered by the other cities' programs in 2016.

UrbanPromise sites have opened in Canada, Honduras, Malawi, Uganda, the Dominican Republic, and Liberia. Each location uses its own local resources, donors, and staff to replicate the Camden-based UrbanPromise. Approximately 2,000 children and youth currently participate in these sites' after school programs, summer camps, feeding programs, and girls' empowerment initiatives.

Three private high schools, so far serving approximately 275 students, as well as two homes for orphaned children have been launched in Malawi.

== Notable support ==
Over the last decade, UrbanPromise has received significant support Diane Sawyer. Since her 2007 20/20 special "Waiting on the World to Change," which focused on poverty in Camden and highlighted UrbanPromise, Sawyer has continued to stay connected to the organization. In September 2012, she was the keynote speaker at UrbanPromise's 25th Anniversary Banquet . Her relationship with UrbanPromise was featured as the cover story in the November 2012 edition of SJ Magazine.

Additional supporters include: David Kim, Denise Morrison, Shane Claiborne, Philip Yancey and Brian McLaren.

== Notable affiliated persons ==
- Diane Sawyer
- Tony Campolo
- David Kim
- Shane Claiborne
- Philip Yancey
- Brian McLaren
- Denise Morrison
- Fabolous
- Charles Tillman
