= Wende, New York =

Hamlet in New York, United States

Coordinates: 42°56′03″N 78°32′48″W

Wende is a hamlet in the town of Alden in Erie County, New York, United States.
