= Wende Correctional Facility =

Prison in Alden, New York, US

- Interactive map of Wende Correctional Facility
- Location: 3040 Wende Road Alden, New York; 42.93036°N 78.54221°W
- Status: Operational
- Security class: Maximum/Supermax
- Capacity: 961
- Opened: 1923 (as county jail); 1983 (as state prison)
- Managed by: New York State Department of Corrections and Community Supervision

Wende Correctional Facility is an American maximum-security prison for men located in the town of Alden in Erie County, New York, 23 miles (37 km) east of Buffalo. The prison is named for the Wende area of Alden. The prison was formerly the site of an Erie County jail and was sold to the state to fulfill the need for a maximum-security state prison. The Erie County Correctional Facility was built adjacent to Wende.

== History ==
The state of New York announced its $48 million purchase of the prison on March 24, 1983. At the time of the sale, the facility housed 592 prisoners.

== COVID-19 ==
Like other prisons, Wende was a vector in the COVID-19 pandemic. As of November 6, 2020, 31 prisoners had tested positive for COVID-19; one of the first confirmed infections was that of recently sentenced movie executive Harvey Weinstein. According to a March 31, 2020, statement by the New York State Correctional Officers and Police Benevolent Association, 135 correctional officers at Wende were in quarantine, and 6 had tested positive for the virus.

== Controversies ==
David McClary, convicted of murdering police officer Edward Byrne, spent three years in solitary confinement while at Wende. In 1999, a federal jury granted him $660,000 in damages. In 2000, U.S. Magistrate Jonathan Feldman reduced the award to $237,500. In 2002, Judge Alan Winick, of Nassau County Supreme Court, ruled that the settlement would be awarded to Byrne's family.

In 2003, Wende officers ordered that Muslim prisoner Darryl Holland produce a urine sample in a three-hour window for a drug test. Holland, who was fasting for Ramadan, refused to drink water for the sample and was placed in solitary confinement for 77 days. While Judge Michael Anthony Telesca of the U.S. District Court for the Western District of New York granted the prison summary judgement in 2013, a panel of judges from the Second Circuit ruled that Holland could still sue on First Amendment grounds.

== Notable inmates ==
- Levi Aron - Perpetrator of the 2011 Murder of Leiby Kletzky.
- Jack Abbott - criminal and author. He died by suicide at Wende in 2002.
- Willie Bosket - murderer and arsonist
- Jimmy Burke - mastermind of the Lufthansa Heist. Burke was imprisoned in Wende until his death in 1996.
- Robert Chambers - the "Preppy Killer." He was imprisoned in Wende in 2008 and later transferred to Sullivan Correctional Facility.
- Mark David Chapman - the man who murdered John Lennon in 1980. Chapman was transferred from Attica Correctional Facility to Wende in 2012. In March 2022, Chapman was transferred to Green Haven Correctional Facility.
- Charles Dingle - murderer, robber and rapist whose crimes inspired the 1983 New York Post headline "Headless Body in Topless Bar."
- David Gilbert - participant in the 1981 Brink's robbery and murders. He was released on November 4, 2021.
- Kendall Francois - serial killer
- Vincent Johnson - serial killer
- David Sweat - a man who killed a Broome County sheriff's officer and then led an escape from Clinton Correctional Facility in 2015. He was transferred to Wende in April 2018. In January 2019, Sweat was transferred to Auburn Correctional Facility.
- Maksim Gelman - perpetrator of a 28-hour stabbing spree lasting from February 11, 2011 to February 12, 2011, in New York City, which involved the killing of four people and the wounding of five others.
- Harvey Weinstein - former film producer and convicted sex offender serving a 23-year sentence. He was transferred to Twin Towers Correctional Facility in Los Angeles where he faced additional sexual assault charges. After being convicted and sentenced, he was returned to New York to Mohawk Correctional Facility.
- Kevin Monahan - Convicted for the shooting murder of Kaylin Gillis, where he shot at her and a group of friends in his driveway at his home in Hebron, New York
- Jerry Rosenberg - Mobster convicted of killing two police officers. He was the first New York State inmate to earn a law degree and served as a paralegal assistant at Wende.
