= Alden (village), New York =

Alden
- Village
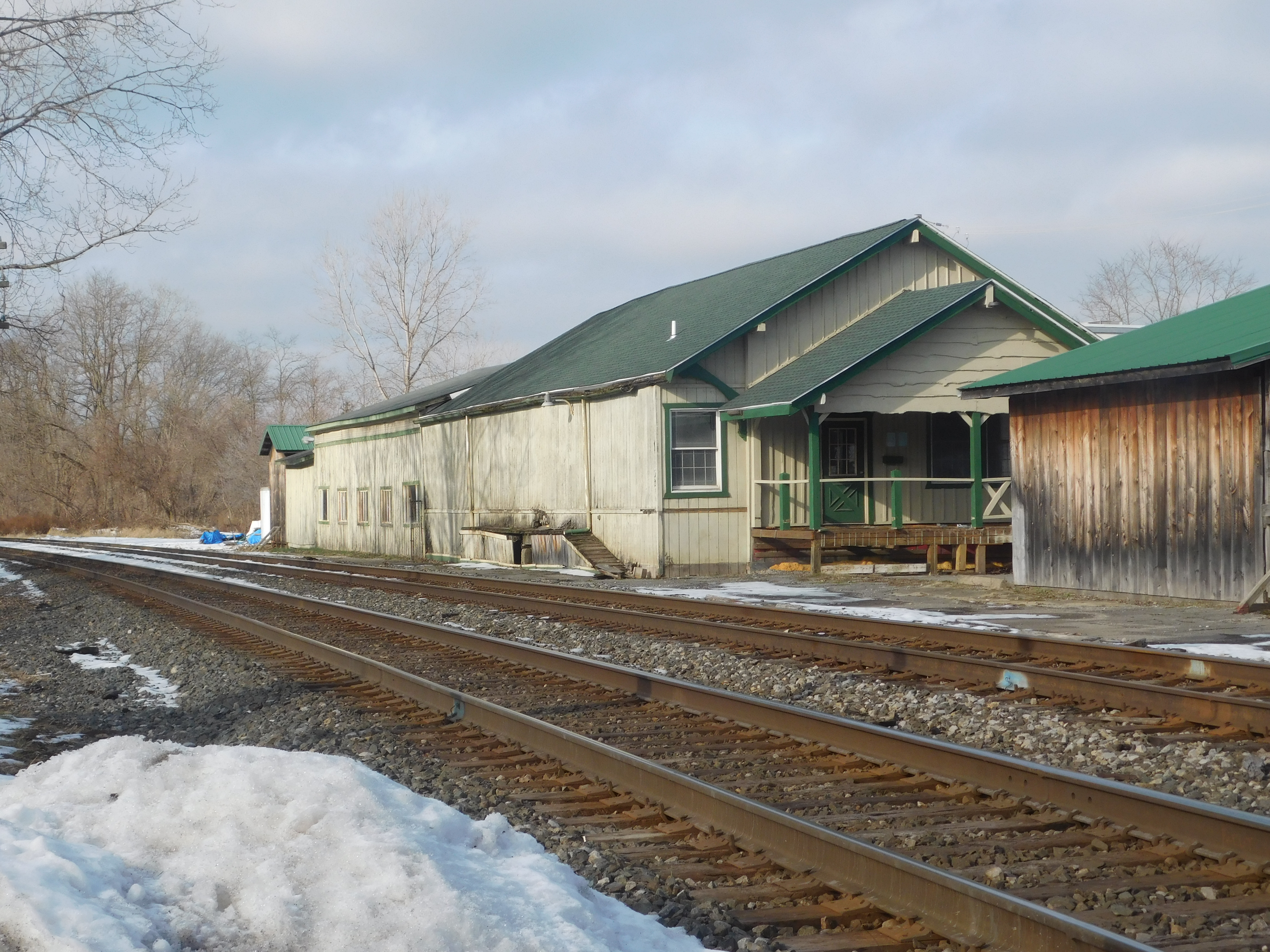
- The former Erie Railroad station in Alden in January 2021.

- Seal

- Location in Erie County and the state of New York
- Coordinates: 42°54′3″N 78°29′36″W
- Country: United States
- State: New York
- County: Erie
- Town: Alden

Area
  - Total: 2.72 sq mi (7.04 km^{2})
  - Land: 2.72 sq mi (7.04 km^{2})
  - Water: 0 sq mi (0.00 km^{2})
- Elevation: 863 ft (263 m)

Population (2020)
  - Total: 2,604
  - Density: 958.0/sq mi (369.87/km^{2})
- Time zone: UTC-5 (Eastern (EST))
  - Summer (DST): UTC-4 (EDT)
- ZIP code: 14004
- Area code: 716
- FIPS code: 36-01088
- GNIS feature ID: 0942255
- Website: www2.erie.gov/village_alden

Alden is a village in Erie County, New York, United States. The population was 2,605 in the 2010 census. It is part of the Buffalo-Niagara Falls metropolitan area.

The village is centrally located within the town of Alden. Its principal street is Broadway (U.S. Route 20).

== History ==
Alden was incorporated in 1869. In 1996, residents of the village voted against dissolving to merge with the town.

== Geography ==
According to the United States Census Bureau, the village has a total area of 2.7 square miles (7.0 km^{2}), all land.

US Route 20 (Broadway) intersects the northern terminus of former NY-239, now Erie County Route 578 (Exchange Street), in Alden village.

== Demographics ==
Historical population
Census	Pop.	Note	%±
1850	150		—
1860	285		90.0%
1880	521		—
1890	533		2.3%
1900	607		13.9%
1910	828		36.4%
1920	755		−8.8%
1930	846		12.1%
1940	954		12.8%
1950	1,252		31.2%
1960	2,042		63.1%
1970	2,651		29.8%
1980	2,488		−6.1%
1990	2,457		−1.2%
2000	2,666		8.5%
2010	2,605		−2.3%
2020	2,604		0.0%
U.S. Decennial Census

In the 2000 census there were 2,666 people, 1,083 households, and 723 families living in the village. The population density was 980.2 inhabitants per square mile (378.5/km^{2}). There were 1,144 housing units at an average density of 420.6 per square mile (162.4/km^{2}). The racial makeup of the village was 98.72% White, 0.34% Black or African American, 0.08% Native American, 0.56% Asian, 0.11% Pacific Islander, and 0.19% from two or more races. Hispanic or Latino of any race were 0.19%.

Of the 1,083 households, 32.9% had children under the age of 18 living with them, 53.2% were married couples living together, 9.7% had a female householder with no husband present, and 33.2% were non-families. 28.3% of households were one person and 12.6% were one person aged 65 or older. The average household size was 2.45, and the average family size was 3.01.

The age distribution was 26.3% under the age of 18, 6.6% from 18 to 24, 30.8% from 25 to 44, 21.1% from 45 to 64, and 15.3% 65 or older. The median age was 38 years. For every 100 females, there were 98.4 males. For every 100 females age 18 and over, there were 93.2 males.

The median household income was $41,630, and the median family income was $51,161. Males had a median income of $34,821 versus $24,245 for females. The per capita income for the village was $20,864. About 4.9% of families and 7.6% of the population were below the poverty line, including 9.8% of those under age 18 and 6.5% of those age 65 or over.

== Notable people ==
- Lyman K. Bass, born in Alden, United States congressman
- Mike Cole, former New York state assemblyman
- Edmund F. Cooke, US congressman
- Charles H. Larkin, Wisconsin pioneer politician
- Doreen Taylor, country singer
