= Battle of Wenden =

Battle of Wenden or Battle of Cēsis may refer to

- Battle of Cēsis (1210)
- Battles of Wenden (1577–1578)
- Battle of Wenden (1601)
- Battle of Wenden (1626)
- Battle of Wenden II (1626)
- Battle of Cēsis (1919)
