= Millgrove, New York =

- hamlet
- Location in New York Millgrove (the United States)
- Coordinates: 42°56′37″N 78°33′10″W
- Country: United States
- State: New York
- County: Erie
- Town: Alden
- Elevation: 778 ft (237 m)
- Time zone: UTC-5 (Eastern (EST))
  - Summer (DST): UTC-4 (EDT)
- ZIP code: 14001
- Area code: 716
- GNIS feature ID: 957339

Millgrove is a hamlet in the town of Alden in Erie County, New York, United States.
