= Marilla, New York =

- Town
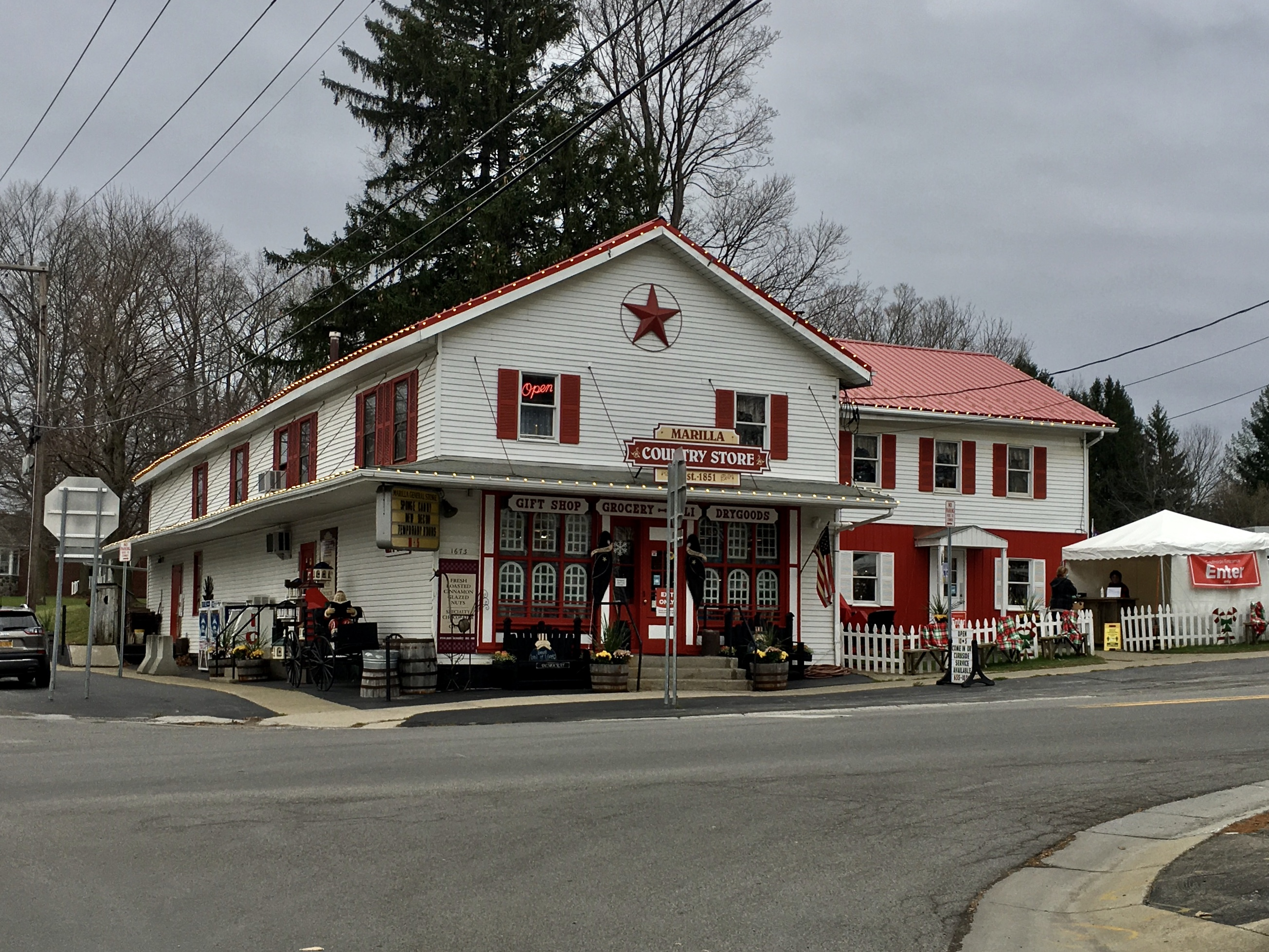
- Marilla Country Store

- Flag Seal

- Location in Erie County and the state of New York.

- Location of New York in the United States
- Coordinates: 42°49′36″N 78°32′14″W
- Country: United States
- State: New York
- County: Erie County
- Incorporated: 1853
- Named for: Marilla Rogers

Government
  - Town Supervisor: Brian Nolan Sr. (R) Town Council: Vacant; Matthew Dolegowski (R); Anthony Sebastiano Sr. (R); Randy Reichert (R)

Area
  - Total: 27.54 sq mi (71.34 km^{2})
  - Land: 27.51 sq mi (71.24 km^{2})
  - Water: 0.039 sq mi (0.10 km^{2})
- Elevation: 915 ft (279 m)

Population (2020)
  - Total: 5,189 ▼
  - Density: 195.1/sq mi (75.31/km^{2})
- Time zone: UTC-5 (EST)
  - Summer (DST): UTC-4 (EDT)
- ZIP Codes: 14102 (Marilla); 14004 (Alden); 14052 (East Aurora); 14037 (Cowlesville); 14059 (Elma); 14086 (Lancaster)
- Area code: 716
- FIPS code: 36-029-45601
- FIPS code: 36-45601
- GNIS feature ID: 0979198
- Website: www.townofmarilla.gov

Marilla is a small town and extreme outer ring suburb of Buffalo in Erie County, New York, United States. The population was 5,189 at the 2020 census. The name of the town is derived from Marilla Rogers, an early school teacher.

== History ==
This part of the county was first settled around 1827. At the time, the land where Marilla sits (along with neighboring Elma) was part of the Buffalo Creek Reservation, and members of the Ebenezer Society were the first to settle on the Seneca lands. The land was opened to general settlement shortly after the Treaty of Buffalo Creek was finalized in 1842.

The town of Marilla was organized in 1853 from parts of the towns of Alden and Wales. Marilla Rogers gave her name to this town; she died in 1855 when she was 38, just two years after the town was given the name.

Located on Two Rod Road is one of the town's oldest stores: the historic Marilla General Store, currently known as the Marilla Country Store.

== Geography ==
According to the United States Census Bureau, the town has a total area of 27.54 square miles (71.34 km^{2}), of which 27.51 square miles (71.24 km^{2}) is land and 0.04 square miles (0.10 km^{2}), or 0.14%, is water.

Buffalo Creek flows through the southwest part of the town, and Cayuga Creek flows through the northeast part of town.

=== Adjacent towns ===
- Alden - north
- Lancaster - northwest
- Elma - west
- Aurora - southwest
- Wales - south
- Bennington in Wyoming County - east

=== Major highways ===
- New York State Route 354 (Clinton Street), east–west highway through the north part of town from Elma into Bennington.

== Demographics ==
Historical population
Census	Pop.	Note	%±
1860	1,596		—
1870	1,804		13.0%
1880	1,825		1.2%
1890	1,590		−12.9%
1900	1,441		−9.4%
1910	1,382		−4.1%
1920	1,237		−10.5%
1930	1,282		3.6%
1940	1,364		6.4%
1950	1,482		8.7%
1960	2,252		52.0%
1970	3,250		44.3%
1980	4,861		49.6%
1990	5,250		8.0%
2000	5,709		8.7%
2010	5,327		−6.7%
2020	5,189		−2.6%
U.S. Decennial Census

As of the census of 2000, there were 5,709 people, 2,021 households, and 1,616 families residing in the town. The population density was 207.2 inhabitants per square mile (80.0/km^{2}). There were 2,088 housing units at an average density of 75.8 per square mile (29.3/km^{2}). The racial makeup of the town was 99.09% White, 0.12% African American, 0.07% Native American, 0.16% Asian, 0.02% Pacific Islander, 0.14% from other races, and 0.40% from two or more races. Hispanic or Latino of any race were 0.46% of the population.

There were 2,021 households, out of which 36.8% had children under the age of 18 living with them, 69.1% were married couples living together, 8.2% had a female householder with no husband present, and 20.0% were non-families. 17.0% of all households were made up of individuals, and 6.4% had someone living alone who was 65 years of age or older. The average household size was 2.82 and the average family size was 3.21.

In the town, the population was spread out, with 27.2% under the age of 18, 7.1% from 18 to 24, 27.4% from 25 to 44, 27.2% from 45 to 64, and 11.1% who were 65 years of age or older. The median age was 39 years. For every 100 females, there were 98.7 males. For every 100 females age 18 and over, there were 98.0 males.

The median income for a household in the town was $51,868, and the median income for a family was $56,572. Males had a median income of $41,477 versus $23,700 for females. The per capita income for the town was $23,820. About 2.6% of families and 3.7% of the population were below the poverty line, including 4.6% of those under age 18 and 4.9% of those age 65 or over.

== Communities and locations in Marilla ==
- Buffalo Creek – A stream that flows westward through the south part of the town.
- Bush Gardens – A small hamlet in the northeast part of the town.
- Marilla – A hamlet in the northwest part of the town, located on Buffalo Creek and at the junction of Two Rod and Bullis Roads. The community was founded around 1829.
- Porterville – A hamlet in the southwest corner of the town, located on Buffalo Creek. The name of the community is from Archibald Porter, an early mill operator.
- Williston – location near the junction of Williston and Three Rod roads. The name comes from the Willis family, early settlers.

== Schools ==
Students in Marilla attend either the Iroquois Central School District or Alden Central School District. Marilla Primary, a K-4 school in the Iroquois School District, is located in Marilla on Bullis Road.

Public schools in Marilla are under the jurisdiction of the Iroquois School District or the Alden Central School District. Both Iroquois and Alden Central Schools consistently enjoy rankings within the top school districts in the Western New York region. Alden Central Schools ranked number seven in 2011, while Iroquois came in at number eleven. Consisting of approximately 3,000 students district-wide, Iroquois divides its students in an unconventional manner, with three separate primary schools, an intermediate (5th grade)/middle school for students from 6th to 8th grade, and a high school for students in 9th to 12th grade. While the primary schools are located in the respective towns indicated by their names (Elma Primary, Marilla Primary, and Wales Primary), the other two schools are located on the same expansive campus at 2111 Girdle Road in Elma. The Campus is divided by offices in such that the high school and middle school are separated by the district offices, acting as a buffer between the similar age groups. The three buildings are connected by walkways, but it is rare that students should need to leave the building to which their grade belongs. In accord, the primary, middle, and high school buildings each have their own gymnasium, cafeteria, library, and administrative offices. One of the greatest assets of this school district is the expansive undeveloped areas surrounding every school, providing plenty of open space for younger students to play and older students to participate in extracurricular activities. Some of the latest additions to the school, in fact, involve the development of a large field directly across the street from the high school. In addition, the middle school library was recently remodeled, an extra wing of classrooms was added to the high school.
