= Wenden =

Wenden may refer to:

- Wenden (Brunswick), a town district within Wenden-Thune-Harxbüttel, Germany
- Wenden (Sauerland), Germany
- Wenden-Thune-Harxbüttel, a borough in Brunswick, Germany
- Wenden, Arizona
- Cēsis, Latvia (previously Wenden in German)
  - Wenden Voivodeship, administrative unit of the Polish-Lithuanian Commonwealth
  - Kreis Wenden, administrative unit of the Russian Empire
- The German name for the Wends, Slavs living near Germanic settlement areas
- The historical Duchy of Wenden or Werle now part of the German state Mecklenburg-Vorpommern
- Michael Wenden (born 1949), Australian Olympic swimmer

== See also ==
- Wenden Lofts, a parish in Essex, England
- Battle of Wenden (disambiguation)
- Wendens Ambo, a village in Essex, England
- Wende (disambiguation)
