= Alden, New York =

- Town
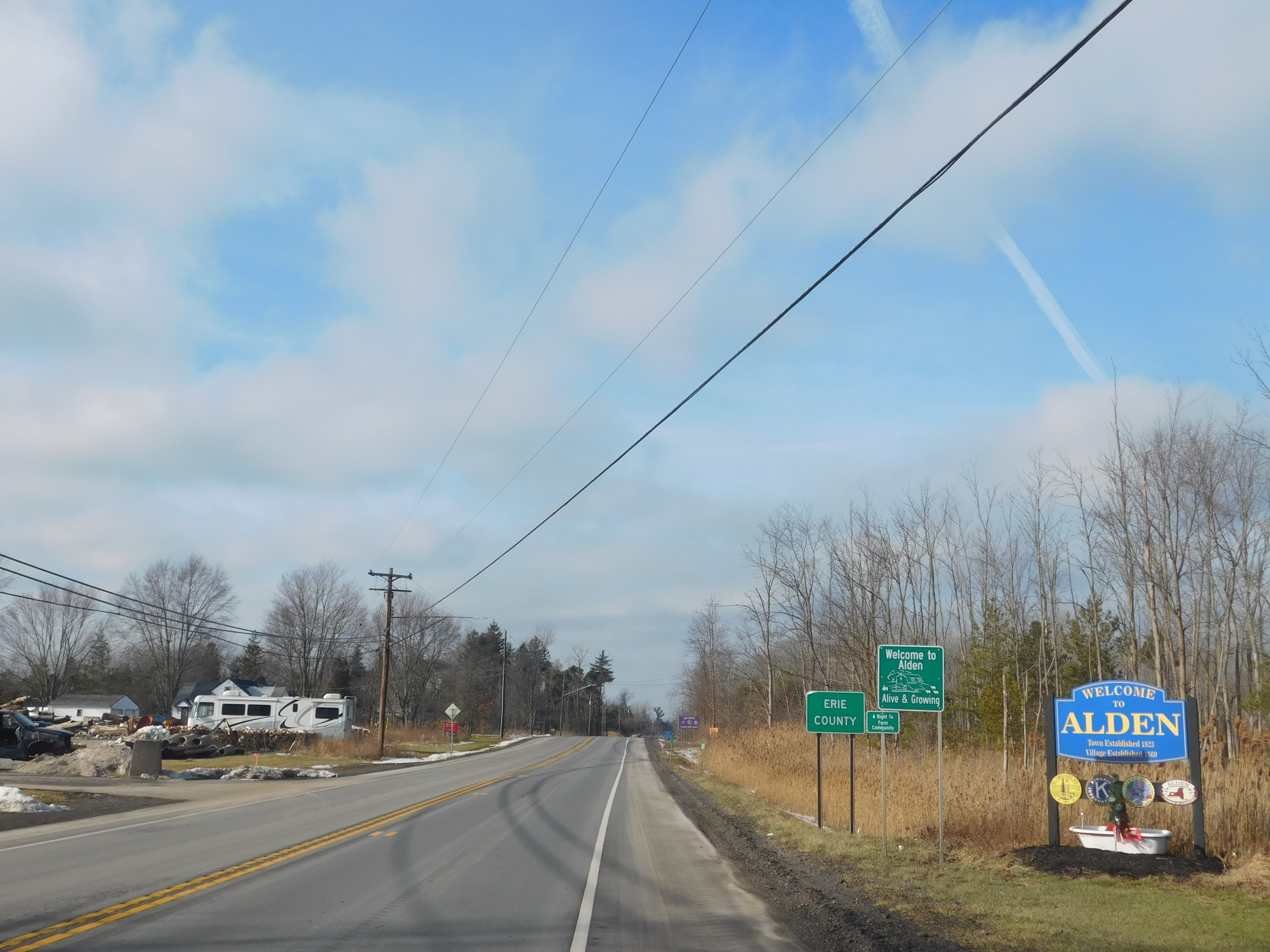
- Signage entering the town of Alden on U.S. Route 20 westbound.

- Seal

- Location in Erie County and the state of New York.

- Location of New York in the United States
- Coordinates: 42°54′00″N 78°29′27″W
- Country: United States
- State: New York
- County: Erie County
- Incorporated: 1823

Government
  - Supervisor: Colleen Pautler (R) Town Council: Randell Crist (R); Gwendolyn Bork (R); Mark Kerl (R); Gina Waiss (R)

Area
  - Total: 34.51 sq mi (89.38 km^{2})
  - Land: 34.31 sq mi (88.86 km^{2})
  - Water: 0.20 sq mi (0.52 km^{2})
- Elevation: 863 ft (263 m)

Population (2020)
  - Total: 9,706 ▼
  - Density: 292.5/sq mi (112.92/km^{2})
- Time zone: UTC-5 (EST)
  - Summer (DST): UTC-4 (EDT)
- ZIP Codes: 14004 (Alden); 14001 (Akron); 14086 (Lancaster)
- Area code: 716
- FIPS code: 36-029-01099
- Website: alden.erie.gov

Alden is a town in Erie County, New York, United States. The population was 10,865 at the 2010 census. The town is derived from a family name known to early settlers.

Alden is in the northeast part of Erie County, east of Buffalo. It contains a village also called Alden.

== History ==
The town of Alden, which had previously been part of Clarence, was established on March 27, 1823, and codified in the Laws of the State of New York, Sess.46, ch. 89 (1823). Part of Alden was later given up to form the town of Marilla in 1853.

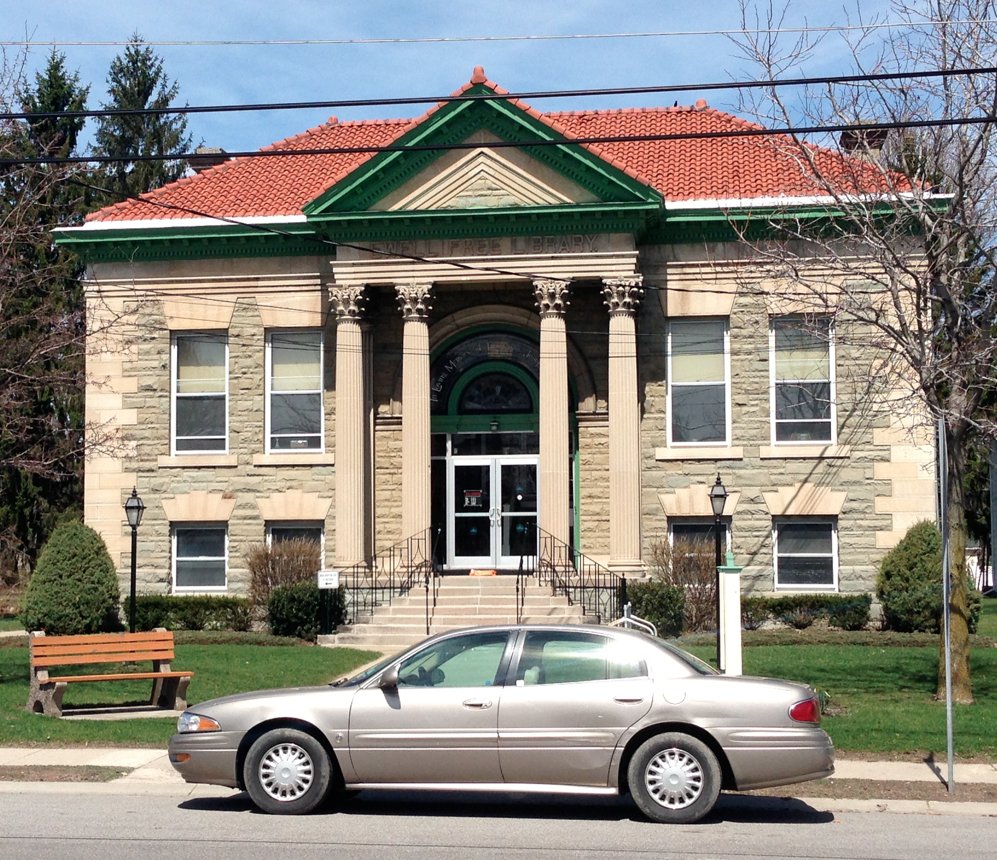
Ewell Free Library in Alden was built in 1913.

In 1856, the community of Alden in the town set itself off by incorporating as a village. The town was made more popular by the discovery of the black water baths in 1891. People would travel from Buffalo and from areas far east of the town to experience the healing powers of the black water baths.

== Geography ==
According to the United States Census Bureau, the town has a total area of 34.5 square miles (89.4 km^{2}), of which 34.3 square miles (88.9 km^{2}) is land and 0.19 square miles (0.5 km^{2}), or 0.58%, is water. Ellicott Creek, a tributary of Tonawanda Creek and thence the Niagara River, flows westward through the north-central part of the town. Cayuga Creek, a tributary of the Buffalo River, flows westward through the southern part of the town.

The east town line is the border of Genesee County (town of Darien), while part of the south town line forms the border of Wyoming County (town of Bennington). Alden is also bordered by the town of Newstead (north), the town of Lancaster (west), and the town of Marilla (south).

U.S. Route 20 (Broadway) is an east–west highway across the south part of the town, and New York State Route 33 is a highway across the northern part.

=== Climate ===
This climatic region is typified by large seasonal temperature differences, with warm to hot (and often humid) summers and cold (sometimes severely cold) winters. According to the Köppen Climate Classification system, Alden has a humid continental climate, abbreviated "Dfb" on climate maps.

== Demographics ==
Historical population
Census	Pop.	Note	%±
1830	1,257		—
1840	1,984		57.8%
1850	2,520		27.0%
1860	2,442		−3.1%
1870	2,547		4.3%
1880	2,534		−0.5%
1890	2,304		−9.1%
1900	2,396		4.0%
1910	2,748		14.7%
1920	2,433		−11.5%
1930	4,463		83.4%
1940	4,613		3.4%
1950	4,899		6.2%
1960	7,615		55.4%
1970	9,787		28.5%
1980	10,093		3.1%
1990	10,372		2.8%
2000	10,470		0.9%
2010	10,865		3.8%
2020	9,706		−10.7%
U.S. Decennial Census

U.S. Census Bureau quickfacts: Alden town, Erie County, New York. (n.d.). https://www.census.gov/quickfacts/fact/table/aldentowneriecountynewyork/IPE120221#IPE120221

As of the census of 2017-2021, there were 9,706 people, 3,304 householdS in the town. The population density was 282.9 per square mile. The racial makeup of the town was 87.3% White, 10.1% Black or African American, 0.6% Native American, 0.8% Asian, 0.00% Pacific Islander, and 0.06% from two or more races. Hispanic or Latino of any race were 2.2% of the population.

There were 3,3043 households, out of which 86.1% had children under the age of 18 living with them, 64.3% were married couples living together. The average household size was 2.69.

In the town the population was spread out, with 19.3% under the age of 18, 4.7% under the age of 5, 18.5% over the age of 65 and the female population making up 45.6%

The median income for a household in the town was $75,028. The per capita income for the town was $26,235. About 4.1% of the population were below the poverty line.

For education, 87.9% of the population over 25 was a high school graduate or higher with 21.9% ages 25 and over had a bachelor's degree or higher.

Household with a computer were 93.0% and households with broad band Internet were 88.6%.

== Notable people ==
- Lyman K. Bass, born in Alden, United States congressman
- Josephine Penfield Cushman Bateham (1829-1901), social reformer, editor, writer
- Mike Cole, former New York State Assemblyman
- Edmund F. Cooke, former US congressman
- Roswell F. Cottrell, Seventh-day Adventist Church advocate who lived in Millgrove
- Paul G. Gassman, organic chemist
- Charles H. Larkin, Wisconsin pioneer politician
- Doreen Taylor, country singer.
- Adam Zyglis, political cartoonist

== Communities and locations in Alden ==
- Alden - the Village of Alden in the east part of the town on US-20.
- Alden Center – located by Westwood Road and Sandridge Road.
- Alden Station – A location between Alden village and Crittenden.
- Crittenden – A hamlet at Genesee Street (NY-33) and Crittenden Road. Many businesses are located around this important intersection.
- Dellwood – A location on the western town line.
- Looneyville - A hamlet located on Townline Road at Walden Avenue, north of the hamlet of Dellwood.
- Millgrove – A small hamlet of several businesses and many residences around the intersection of Genesee Street (NY-33) and N. Millgrove Road. Many of the original businesses have been closed or converted to others uses.
- Peters Corners – A location at the intersection of Genesee Street (NY-33) and South Newstead Road, composed of a few scattered residences.
- Town Line – a location on the western town line.
- Town Line Station – A location at the western town line, bordering the town of Lancaster. It is north of Town Line.
- Wende – A region in the northwest corner of the town, where several public institutions are located.
- West Alden – A location at the intersection of Broadway and Sandridge Road, west of the village of Alden.

== Additional information about Alden ==
The Erie County Correctional Facility, and Wende Correctional Facility are located in the northwest part of the town.

The Alden Advertiser is a local newspaper servicing the community.
