= Anilide =

Class of organic compounds

General structure of an anilide, where R denotes possible substituents

In organic chemistry, anilides (or phenylamides) are a class of organic compounds with the general structure R−C(=O)−N(−R’)−C_{6}H_{5}. They are amide derivatives of aniline (H_{2}N−C_{6}H_{5}).

== Preparation ==
Aniline reacts with acyl chlorides or carboxylic anhydrides to give anilides. For example, reaction of aniline with acetyl chloride provides acetanilide (CH_{3}−CO−NH−C_{6}H_{5}). At high temperatures, aniline and carboxylic acids react to give anilides.

== Uses ==
- Herbicides - diflufenican, dimethenamid, flamprop, propanil, tetflupyrolimet, acetochlor, alachlor, butachlor, delachlor, diethatyl, dimethachlor, ethaprochlor, metazachlor, pretilachlor, propisochlor, pyrnachlor, terbuchlor, thenylchlor, xylachlor
- Fungicides - Oxycarboxin, Carboxin
