= Xylachlor =

Weed control herbicide

Names
- Preferred IUPAC name 2-chloro-N-(2,3-dimethylphenyl)-N-propan-2-ylacetamide
- Other names: 2-chloro-N-isopropylacet-2,3-xylidide; 2-chloro-N-(2,3-dimethylphenyl)-N-(1-methylethyl)acetamide; xylachlore; CL 206784; AC 206784

Identifiers
CAS Number	63114-77-2
3D model (JSmol)	Interactive image
ChemSpider	143082
PubChem CID	162992
UNII	9J19F5321S
CompTox Dashboard (EPA)	DTXSID2042513
- InChI: InChI=1S/C13H18ClNO/c1-9(2)15(13(16)8-14)12-7-5-6-10(3)11(12)4/h5-7,9H,8H2,1-4H3 Key: UDRNNGBAXFCBLJ-UHFFFAOYSA-N
- SMILES: CC1=C(C(=CC=C1)N(C(C)C)C(=O)CCl)C

Properties
Chemical formula	C_{13}H_{18}ClNO
Molar mass	239.74 g·mol^{−1}
- Except where otherwise noted, data are given for materials in their standard state (at 25 °C [77 °F], 100 kPa). Infobox references

Xylachlor is a selective herbicide, used to preëmergently control annual grasses on cereals, wheat, soy and rice. It is an anilide and a (chloro)acetanilide. As of 2023 it is considered obsolete, but may still be in use.

It was manufactured by American Cyanamid under the "Combat" trademark, registered in August 1979 and expired (by non-renewal) in 1986.

Compared to the fellow acetanilides alachlor, acetochlor and metolachlor, xylachlor had the weakest control of pigweed and setaria, though the greatest selectivity. Xylachlor is also less detrimental to sorghum, but this is offset by the need for higher application rates to achieve similar weed control. It controlled annual grasses and some broadleaf weeds, and uis generally less active than pendimethalin.

Xylachlor's safety is not well studied. It and the related delachlor could be toxic, or carcinogen; some software prediction programs say so (ToxTree, Vega Hub) and some disagree. (Lazar and TEST)

== Application ==
It has been formulated as a 48% w/v emulsifiable concentrate, which was in a 1979 test, applied at 2.0-6.0 kg/Ha of active ingredient, in 400 L/Ha of spray water.

Application Rate Effects
Application Rate	Crops tolerant	Weeds controlled
4 kg/Ha	wheat, pea, rape, kale, radish, cowpea, chickpea, groundnut, soyabeen, cotton, kenaf	bromus sterilis (barren brome), avena fatua (common wild oat), alopecurus myosuroides (blackgrass / twitchgrass), senecio vulgaris (groundsel), veronica persica (speedwell), phalaris minor (small canary-grass)
1 kg/Ha	barley, field bean, carrot, sugar beet, maize, sorghum (with antidote), tomato	poa annua (annual bluegrass), poa trivialis (rough bluegrass / meadowgrass), oryza punctata (red rice), echinochloa crus-galli (cockspur / barnyardgrass), digitaria sanguinalis (crabgrass), amaranthus retroflexus (common tumbleweed)
0.25 kg/Ha	oat, onion, lettuce, sorghum, pigeon pea, sesamum	Holcus lanatus (Yorkshire fog/meadow soft grass), Eleusine indica (goosegrass), Snowdenia polystachya

In that table, 'tolerant' means the crop's vigour was reduced by less than 15%, and 'controlled' means the weed's vigour or number was reduced by more than 70%.

== Links ==
- Xylachlor in the Pesticide Properties DataBase (PPDB)
