= C14H20ClNO2 =

The molecular formula C_{14}H_{20}ClNO_{2} (molar mass: 269.76 g/mol, exact mass: 269.1183 u) may refer to:

- Acetochlor, an herbicide
- Alachlor, an herbicide
