= Chloroacetyl chloride =

- Skeletal formula

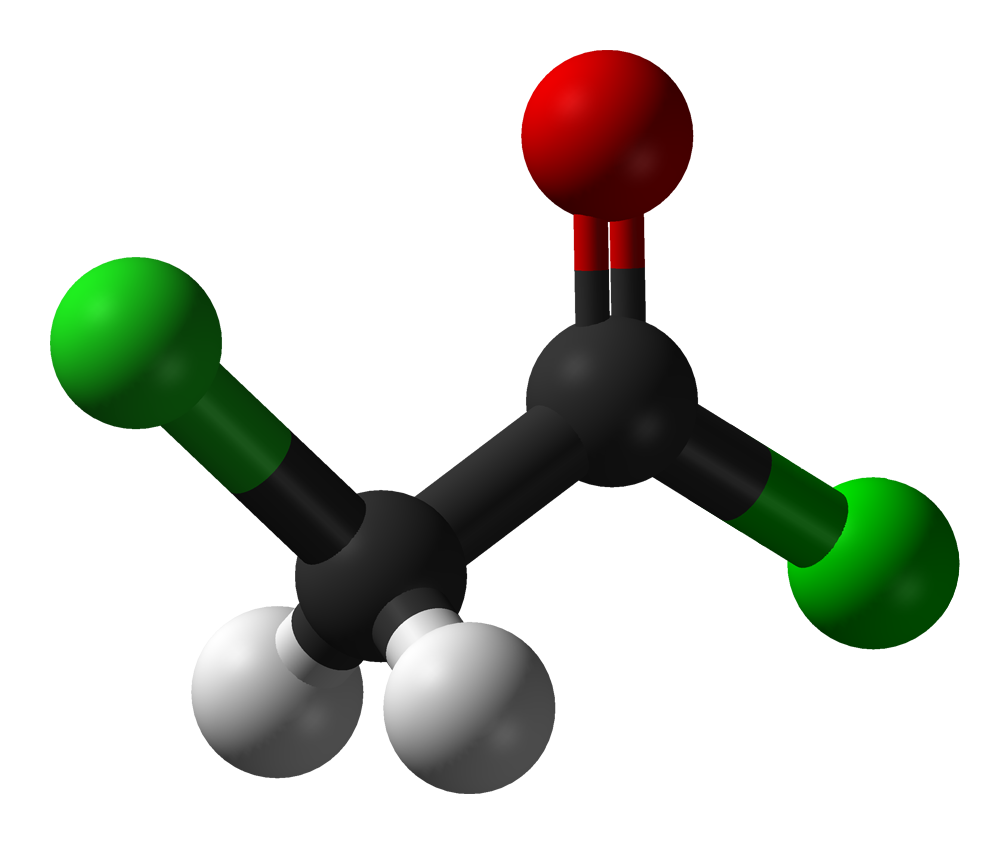
- ball-and-stick model

Names
- Preferred IUPAC name Chloroacetyl chloride
- Other names 2-Chloroacetyl chloride Chloroacetic acid chloride Chloroacetic chloride Monochloroacetyl chloride

Identifiers
CAS Number	79-04-9
3D model (JSmol)	Interactive image
ChEBI	CHEBI:34624
ChEMBL	ChEMBL3187685
ChemSpider	13856283
ECHA InfoCard	100.001.065
EC Number	201-171-6
KEGG	C14859
PubChem CID	6577
RTECS number	AO6475000
UNII	K5UML06YUO
UN number	1752
CompTox Dashboard (EPA)	DTXSID4026472
- InChI: InChI=1S/C2H2Cl2O/c3-1-2(4)5/h1H2 Key: VGCXGMAHQTYDJK-UHFFFAOYSA-N; InChI=1/C2H2Cl2O/c3-1-2(4)5/h1H2 Key: VGCXGMAHQTYDJK-UHFFFAOYAB
- SMILES: C(C(=O)Cl)Cl

Properties
Chemical formula	C_{2}H_{2}Cl_{2}O
Molar mass	112.94 g·mol^{−1}
Appearance	Colorless to yellow liquid
Density	1.42 g/mL
Melting point	−22 °C (−8 °F; 251 K)
Boiling point	106 °C (223 °F; 379 K)
Solubility in water	Reacts
Vapor pressure	19 mmHg (20°C)

Hazards
- GHS labelling
Pictograms	(GHS05: Corrosive) (GHS06: Toxic) (GHS08: Health hazard) (GHS09: Environmental hazard)
Signal word	Danger
Hazard statements	H301, H311, H314, H331, H372, H400
Precautionary statements	P260, P264, P270, P271, P273, P280, P301+P310, P301+P330+P331, P302+P352, P303+P361+P353, P304+P340, P305+P351+P338, P310, P311, P312, P314, P321, P322, P330, P361, P363, P391, P403+P233, P405, P501
NFPA 704 (fire diamond)	3 0 1
Flash point	noncombustible
- NIOSH (US health exposure limits)
PEL (Permissible)	none
REL (Recommended)	TWA 0.05 ppm (0.2 mg/m^{3})
IDLH (Immediate danger)	N.D.
Safety data sheet (SDS)	Oxford MSDS
- Except where otherwise noted, data are given for materials in their standard state (at 25 °C [77 °F], 100 kPa). verify (what is ?) Infobox references

Chloroacetyl chloride is a chlorinated acyl chloride. It is a bifunctional compound, making it a useful building block chemical.

== Production ==
Industrially, it is produced by the carbonylation of methylene chloride, oxidation of vinylidene chloride, or the addition of chlorine to ketene. It may be prepared from chloroacetic acid and thionyl chloride, phosphorus pentachloride, or phosgene.

== Reactions ==
Chloroacetyl chloride is bifunctional—the acyl chloride easily forms esters and amides, while the other end of the molecule is able to form other linkages, e.g. with amines. The use of chloroacetyl chloride in the synthesis of lidocaine is illustrative:

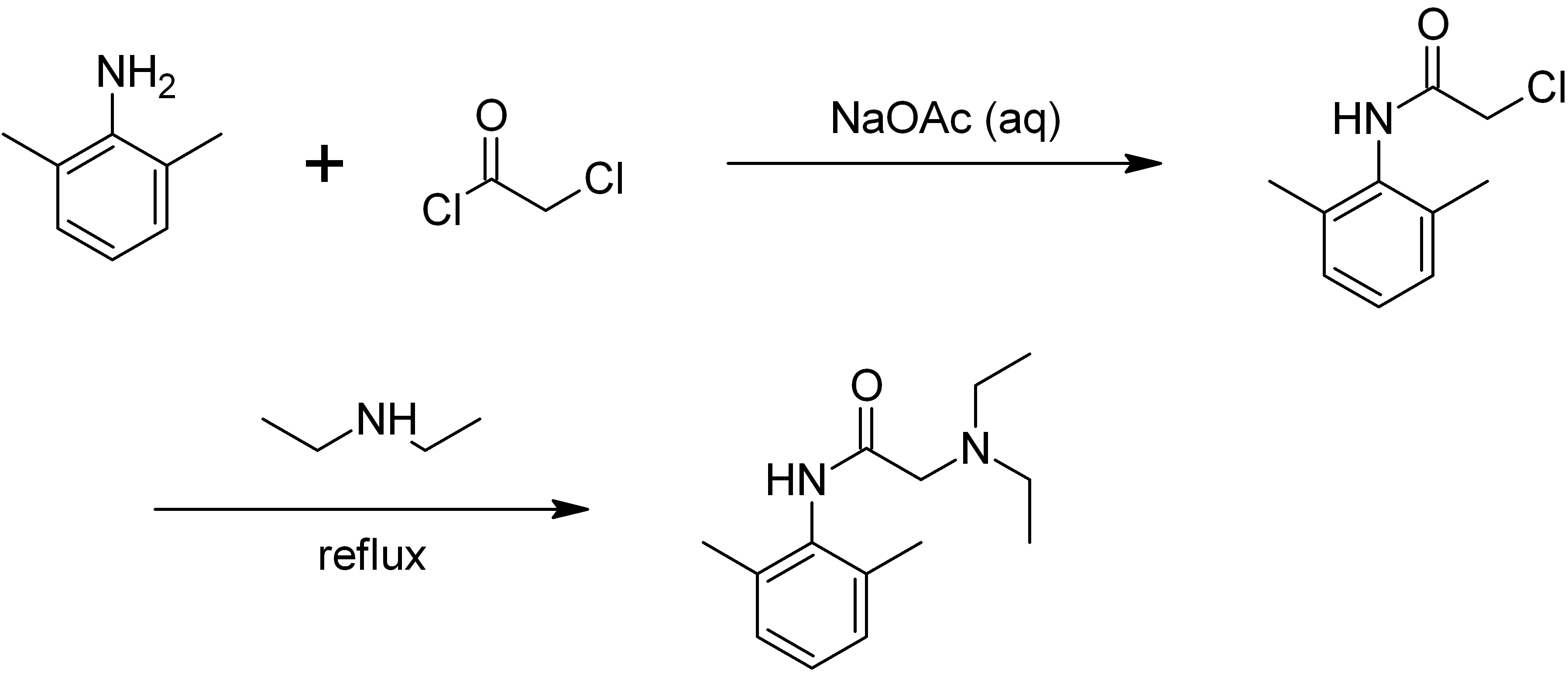

== Applications ==
The major use of chloroacetyl chloride is as an intermediate in the production of herbicides in the chloroacetanilide family including metolachlor, acetochlor, alachlor and butachlor; an estimated 100 million pounds are used annually. Some chloroacetyl chloride is also used to produce phenacyl chloride, another chemical intermediate, also used as a tear gas. Phenacyl chloride is synthesized in a Friedel-Crafts acylation of benzene, with an aluminium chloride catalyst:

With anisole, it is used for the synthesis of venlafaxine.

In one patent, chloroacetyl chloride was used in the production of trianisylethylene [7109-27-5], a compound with known estrogenic activity in its own right but is used as a precursor for Chlorotrianisene.

== Safety ==
Like other acyl chlorides, reaction with other protic compounds such as amines, alcohols, and water generates hydrochloric acid, making it a lachrymator.

There is no regulated permissible exposure limit set by the Occupational Safety and Health Administration. However, the National Institute for Occupational Safety and Health has set a recommended exposure limit at 0.05 ppm over an eight-hour work day.
