= C15H22ClNO2 =

The molecular formula C_{15}H_{22}ClNO_{2} (molar mass: 283.79 g/mol) may refer to:

- Delachlor, an herbicide
- Metolachlor, an herbicide
