= C13H18ClNO =

The molecular formula C_{13}H_{18}ClNO (molar mass: 239.74 g/mol, exact mass: 239.1077 u) may refer to:

- Bupropion
- Lometraline
- Xylachlor
