= Butterfield Cobblestone House =

Historic house in New York, United States

- U.S. National Register of Historic Places
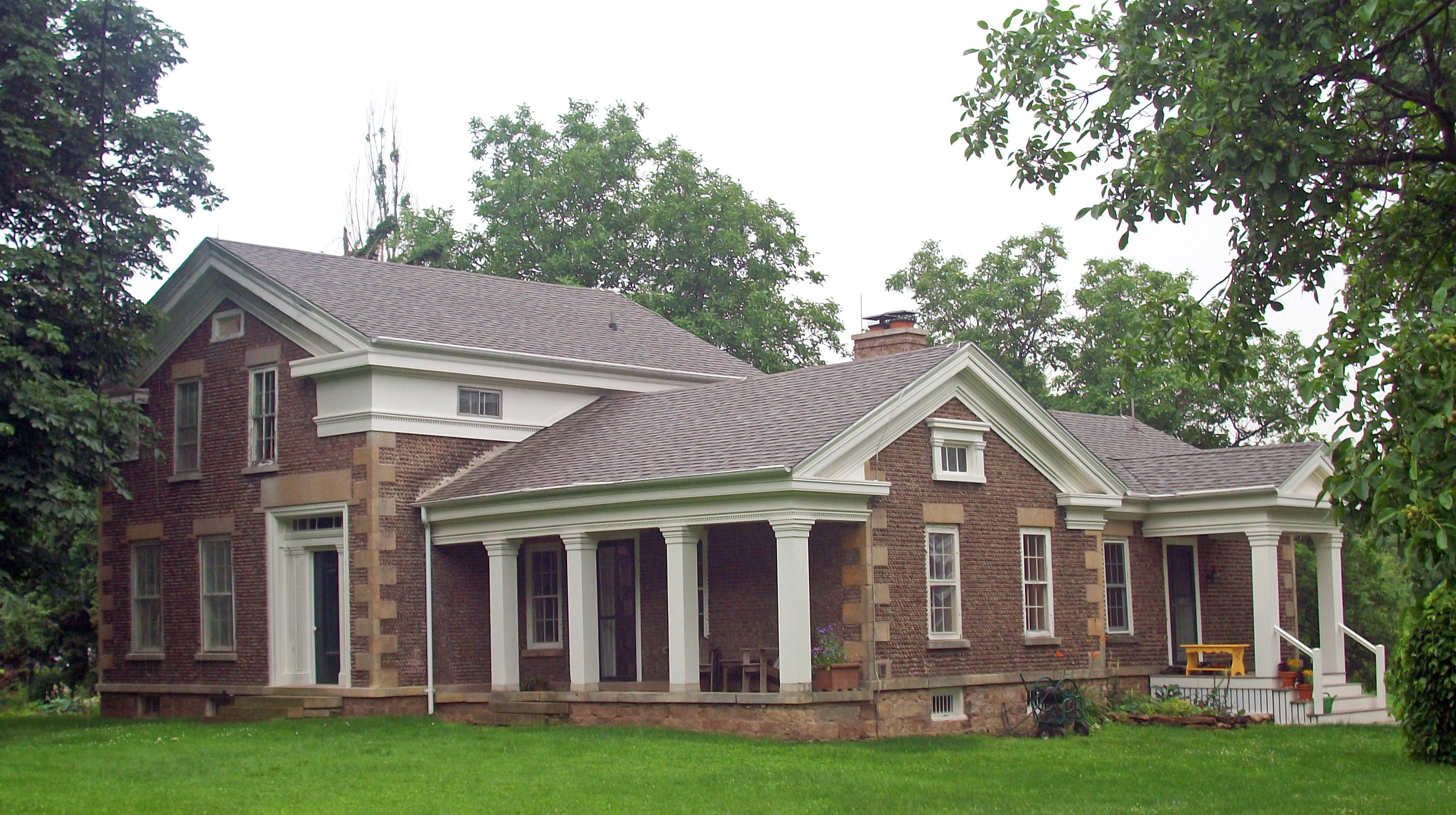
- East profile and north elevation, 2010

- Location within New York Location within the United States
- Location: Clarendon, NY
- Nearest city: Batavia
- Coordinates: 43°11′9″N 78°1′2″W
- Area: 26.4 acres (10.7 ha)
- Built: 1849
- Architect: James Thompson; William Steele; Donaldus Reuben Bartlett; Daniel F. St. John
- Architectural style: Greek Revival
- MPS: Cobblestone Architecture of New York State MPS
- NRHP reference No.: 10000044
- Added to NRHP: March 1, 2010

The Butterfield Cobblestone House is on Bennett Corners Road in the Town of Clarendon, New York, United States, south of the village of Holley. It is a cobblestone structure from the mid-19th century built in the Greek Revival architectural style by a wealthy local farmer to house his large family. Three generations of his descendants would run the farm over the next 80 years. Later owners would make some renovations to the interior.

One of approximately 90 cobblestone structures in Orleans County, it is the only one in Clarendon. It is also considered the finest Greek Revival building in the county. The house and several outbuildings, part of a working farm, were listed on the National Register of Historic Places in 2010, the easternmost property in the county currently so recognized.

== Buildings and grounds ==
The house is located on a 26-acre (11 ha) farm on the west side of Bennett Corners Road in the northern section of the town, three-quarters of a mile (1.21 km) south of the NY 31A state highway. The terrain is generally level, with cleared fields either cultivated, left fallow or used as horse pasture, and woodlots. All nearby properties are also large farms, with a large residential subdivision 0.4 miles (640 m) to the north-northeast.

All the buildings are in the southeast corner of the farm. To their north, along the road, are seven acres (2.8 hectares) of horse pasture, with 13 acres (5.3 ha) of alfalfa and timothy to their rear, in the west. The rest of the property is taken up by a small apple orchard, a mixed vegetable plot, and a woodlot.

=== Exterior ===
The main house, sheltered by a 70-foot-tall (21 m) horse chestnut, has a one-and-a-half-story main block with one-story wings to the north and northwest, its side and rear respectively. It sits on a stone foundation with its sides in mostly lake-washed coursed cobblestones from 1 to 2.5 inches (2.5 to 6.4 cm) in diameter set in mortar. The main block and wings are topped by gabled roofs shingled in asphalt and pierced by a stone chimney where the side and rear wings intersect.

A continuous limestone water table runs around the first story at floor level. Limestone is also used for the windowsills, lintels, quoins and steps to the main entrance. A datestone set in the gable field on the east elevation of the main block gives 1849 as the construction date.

At the rooflines are a molded wooden cornice with wide frieze on the north and south sides of the main block. The basement windows are all screened with vertical bars. On the northeast corner of the north wing is a recessed porch screened by four 12-inch-square (30 cm) wooden columns on limestone slabs, their capitals flaring outward past the beam at the top of the porch. It is floored in Medina sandstone with a limestone border. Its door has a ceramic knob with brown and white swirl.

Another, smaller wooden porch, of recent construction, shelters an entrance on the north of the northwest wing. It has a wooden floor and steps but is otherwise architecturally consistent with the other porch. There is also a tongue and groove wooden door on the north end of the west (rear) facade. At the peak of the gable on the main block on this side is another stone, with the initials "O.B." for Orson Butterfield, the builder and original owner. At the southwest corner is the pedimented double-door entrance to the cellar.

=== Interior ===
The main entrance, at the north end of the main block's east face, is a 2½-inch-thick (6.4 cm) recessed panel wooden door with a ceramic knob. It is flanked by sidelights and pilasters, with a transom atop. It opens into a foyer floored in random-width red pine with beveled-edge baseboard topped by a curved molding on the walls. The doors from it have wide wooden trim and an ogee-topped architrave.

On the south is a square parlor with two windows on the south and east walls, all with recessed panels on either side and below. They are bordered by paneled pilasters on plinth blocks with beveled tops. A door on the south opens into a small office with a treatment similar to the foyer. The north parlor, occupying the wing on that side, has similar treatments as well but their size varies with each window and door, reflecting its origins as three separate rooms combined into one. It is floored in chestnut planks. On the west wall is a fieldstone fireplace with "H & JG, '69" carved into the masonry for its owners and construction date.

To its west, in the northwest wing, is the current dining room, originally the kitchen. It is floored in white oak with a brick fireplace, surrounded by a wooden mantel, set in the east wall, which has a drywall covering over its brown brick. A flagstone hearth is in front of the fireplace. The walls have a similar combination of baseboard and molding as the other rooms.

Pocket doors, believed to have come from a nearby older house, lead west into the kitchen. It has a similar interior to the dining room, with Amish-built oak cabinets. A bathroom and office round out the first floor.

Upstairs are three bedrooms, a large closet and another bathroom. It is less decorated than the first floor. The floorboards are random-width pine and the ceilings are lower.

=== Outbuildings ===
There are three other buildings on the property: a barn, chicken coop and Morton metal building. The first two are old enough and retain sufficient integrity to be considered contributing resources to the National Register listing. The metal building was added in the late 20th century and is not considered contributing.

The wooden barn, just to the northwest of the house, is a 36-by-100-foot (11 by 30 m) structure with a gambrel roof oriented north–south. It has most of its original fieldstone foundation save for a short section of the north end where it was replaced with cement blocks. The roof has asphalt shingles except for the bottom half of the east side, done in corrugated aluminum.

On its east side, facing the road, are three entrances and three windows. The southernmost is a large single sliding door with a crossbar design that opens to reveal a gate at ground level and a locked door to the hayloft above. Two other sliding doors, one faced in wood shingles, are to the north; a small door cut into the tongue-and-groove siding near the north end has since been nailed shut.

The west side, with battens added to its tongue-and-groove, has a pair of sliding doors near the north end opening into the cellar. At the south end are two smaller single sliding doors. In both ends there is a single round window near the gambrel peak. The south end has a lean-to to shelter firewood extended on it below the door to the hayloft.

Inside, the south end is given over to horse stalls. There are three, all with sliding gates with vertical metal bars. A steep staircase leads up to the hayloft. A fourth stall is located behind one of the two tack rooms. A sliding door opens into the granary, now a woodworking shop. To its north is the threshing floor, with a corner staircase leading to the basement.

Two-thirds of the upper story is taken up by the hayloft, divided into two sections. The stairway from the southwest corner, near the horse stalls, opens via a door in the floor. A truss rests on the floor in the south section, suggesting the area beyond it was once open. Similarly, one of the three stone walls in the section of the basement not open is more fragile, with older mortar, suggesting it may have been part of the foundation of a previous barn on the site.

== History ==
Orson Butterfield came to Clarendon from the Jefferson County town of Rodman with his wife Lydia, around 1830, in his early 20s. He bought the hundred acres (40 ha) on which the present farm and house stand and began farming. He served in the state militia and became very successful. The road on which the farm was located was known for most of the 19th century as Butterfield Road.

The house was built in 1849 to house the large Butterfield family. All work was done by local craftsmen, with the cobblestones brought south from Lake Ontario. The Greek Revival design was stylish, but also took into account the needs of a large farm family, with enclosed staircases to conserve floor space and heat, along with more efficient cast iron stoves instead of furnaces.

Three years later, in 1852, Butterfield left home to try his luck in the California Gold Rush. In the meantime his family ran the farm. His brother Rufus is recorded as living there by the 1860 census; son Wilford, who held the deed at the time, died in 1867 of an unspecified illness contracted while fighting in the Civil War. In 1870, Butterfield returned.

When he and Lydia died in 1887, the house was bequeathed to two of his children, Florence Butterfield Lyman and Joseph Pratt Butterfield. Around this time, the current barn was built, the last major development on the property. According to local tradition, it reflected Joseph's success in the Chicago stockyards and the farm he owned in Marengo, Iowa. He transferred his portion to his sister six years later, in 1893.

Florence's will gave the property to her husband for the remainder of his natural life, and specified that it go to her own daughters after that time. One of them, Ora Lyman Reid, transferred her share to her sister's husband, Darius Morton, in 1920. Two years later, he sold it to Italian immigrants Dominic and Josephine Mastrangelo, taking the farm out of the Butterfield family after 90 years.

The Mastrangelos ran the farm until 1961, when they sold it to John and Margaret Green. Three years later, the Greens sold it to C. Howard and Joyce Greene, who ran a tack shop in the barn. They made many of the alterations to the interior of the house, particularly adding the fireplace to the dining room and building a chimney for it on what is believed to be the location of one of the original stove chimneys. Most of those took place around 1969.

Two years later they sold it to Donald and Elmer Gretzinger. Donald soon wanted to sell, but was unable to find a buyer for the entire farm. He subdivided it, and sold the portion with the house and farm buildings on it to Edmond and Ruth Spencer in 1978.

Ruth ran an antiques business out of the barn with her daughter, and was active in the Cobblestone Society, devoted to the history and preservation of buildings of that type. They sold to the current owners in 2007. That family put in the current north porch, replacing a concrete one built in the mid-20th century that was less historic, and remodeled the former creamery into the current kitchen. There have been no other alterations to the house and property.

== See also ==
- National Register of Historic Places listings in Orleans County, New York
