= Chloroacetophenone oxime =

Names
- Preferred IUPAC name (1Z)-2-Chloro-N-hydroxy-1-phenylethan-1-imine

Identifiers
CAS Number	21572-32-7
3D model (JSmol)	Interactive image
ChemSpider	4899199
PubChem CID	5854981
CompTox Dashboard (EPA)	DTXSID90393433
- InChI: InChI=1S/C8H8ClNO/c9-6-8(10-11)7-4-2-1-3-5-7/h1-5,11H,6H2/b10-8- Key: VLXDSXLUNPBBOT-NTMALXAHSA-N
- SMILES: C1=CC=C(C=C1)C(=NO)CCl

Properties
Chemical formula	C_{8}H_{8}ClNO
Molar mass	169.61 g·mol^{−1}
Melting point	88.5–89 °C (191.3–192.2 °F; 361.6–362.1 K)
- Except where otherwise noted, data are given for materials in their standard state (at 25 °C [77 °F], 100 kPa). Infobox references

Chloroacetophenone oxime is the oxime derivative of chloroacetophenone. It is produced by reaction of chloroacetophenone with hydroxylamine. It has powerful lachrymatory and irritant effects.
