= 2002 Diaz pipeline incident =

Chemical spill in Holley, New York, US

2002 Holley chemical spill incident/Diaz pipeline incident
- Date: January 5, 2002
- Location: Holley, New York
- Coordinates: 43.222966,-78.029733
- Type: Major chemical spill
- Cause: Overheating of reactor's pipeline
- Outcome: Contamination of soil and nearby houses, Temporary abandonment of town

The 2002 Diaz pipeline incident, also known simply as the Holley chemical spill, was a chemical leak at the Diaz Chemical Corporation site in Holley, New York. On January 5, 2002, at approximately 9:30 am, a faulty reactor vessel burst open, along with its pipeline carrying chemicals underground from inside the Diaz chemical plant, releasing approximately 80 gallons of thionyl chloride, which was used for chemical warfare, as well as vinyl chloride, chloroacetyl chloride, toluene, 2-chloro-6-fluorophenol & related chemicals, and chlorobenzene into the soil, atmosphere, and into local homes, and contaminating 3,100 tons of concrete.

Citizens complained of nosebleeds, eye irritation, sore throat, headache, and skin rash. Others who resided in the area at the time of the incident reported the effects as "unbearable", causing them to flee to temporary housing in surrounding towns. Due to some of the chemicals involved being cancerous or able to cause other chronic health issues, this caused the evacuation of eight families and other houses in the area to be left abandoned, temporarily leaving Holley as a ghost town. As of 2021, the Environmental Protection Agency (EPA) believed that only 10% of all the chemicals released into the groundwater & soil have been cleaned up, but the Holley, NY town board claims otherwise, and that they have tested the soil and groundwater shown different results.

== Abandonment of chemical plant ==
Shortly after the town evacuation and abandonment of several houses, the former residents of Holley launched a 60 million dollar civil lawsuit against Diaz, which resulted in the company filing for bankruptcy, and abandoning the former chemical plant, leaving behind reactor vessels, filled chemical drums, and 750 tons of contaminated scrap metal.
