= Clarendon Stone Store =

Historic commercial building in New York, United States

- U.S. National Register of Historic Places
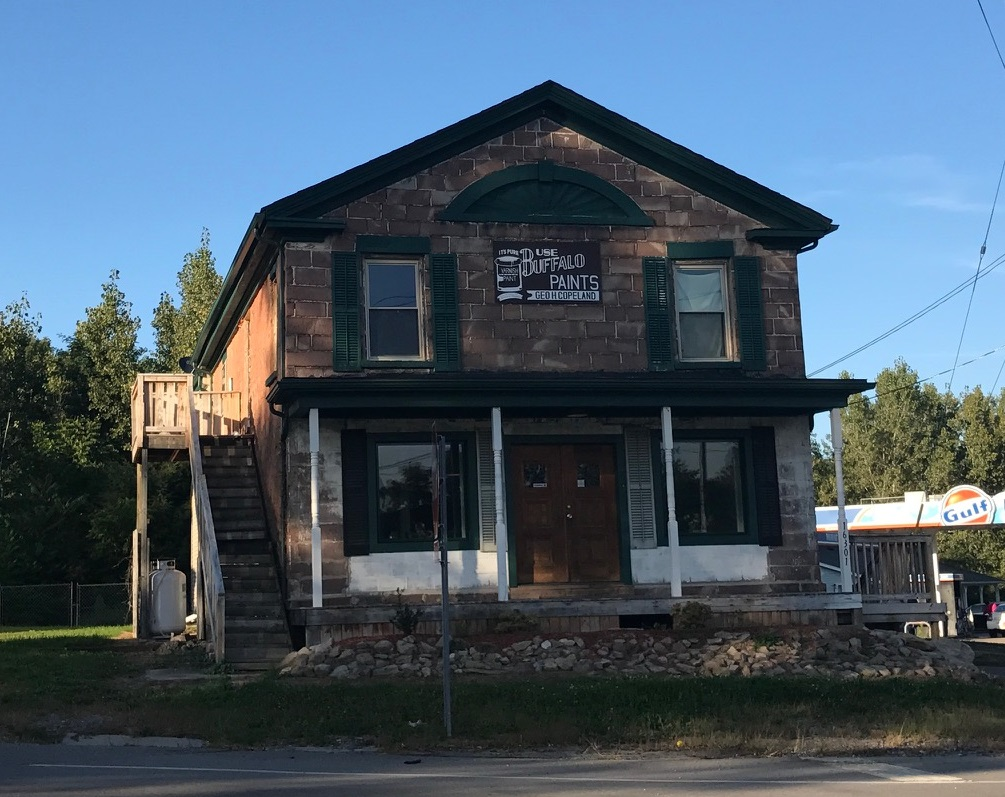

- Location within New York
- Location: 16301 E. Lee Rd., Clarendon, New York
- Coordinates: 43.1938°N 78.0647°W
- Built: 1836
- NRHP reference No.: 12000258
- Added to NRHP: May 9, 2012

The Clarendon Stone Store, also known as the Old Stone Store or the Copeland Store, is an historic commercial building listed on the National Register of Historic Places. Located in the hamlet of Clarendon, in the town of Clarendon, New York, the building sits at the corner of New York State Route 31A (East Lee Road) and New York State Route 237 (Holley–Byron Road).

Like many structures in the region, the store was one of the first buildings in the world built with Medina sandstone, as the material was plentiful in the surrounding fields. The first proprietor of the store was David Sturges. His son-in-law, George Copeland, operated it from 1843 until 1892, giving it one of its alternative names, the Copeland Store. At various points, the building housed post office and town court functions in addition to the general store.

Even after Copeland's family sold the building, it remained a general store and Clarendon landmark until 1975. Eventually, the building was converted to apartments, but the building was condemned in 2007. The town took over ownership in April 2011, and in December 2012 reached an agreement to sell it to a couple from Hilton for one dollar. The two buyers are experienced with renovation of historic properties and have plans to complete renovation by the end of 2013. Their intent is to put commercial space on the first floor, with an apartment on the second.

The building was listed on the National Register of Historic Places on May 9, 2012, with its listing promoted by a group of local citizens who wanted to prevent the building's demolition.
