= Harmon J. Fisk =

American politician

Harmon J. Fisk (August 1, 1839 – April 5, 1912) was a member of the Wisconsin State Assembly.

== Life ==
Fisk was born in Stafford, New York. He later resided in Columbus, Wisconsin. He married Lucy Daniels (1841–1920). Fisk died at his home in Fall River, Wisconsin in 1912.

== Assembly career ==
Fisk was a member of the Assembly during the 1877 session. He was a Republican.
