= Stafford, New York =

- Town
- Location in Genesee County and the state of New York.
- Coordinates: 42°59′48″N 78°5′15″W
- Country: United States
- State: New York
- County: Genesee

Government
  - Type: Town Council
  - Town Supervisor: Robert S. Clement
  - Town Council: Members' List: • Robert F. Pacer; • David G. Vicary; • Ronald T. Panek; • Donald Mullen

Area
  - Total: 31.28 sq mi (81.01 km^{2})
  - Land: 31.10 sq mi (80.54 km^{2})
  - Water: 0.18 sq mi (0.46 km^{2})
- Elevation: 896 ft (273 m)

Population (2020)
  - Total: 2,424
  - Density: 77.95/sq mi (30.10/km^{2})
- Time zone: UTC-5 (Eastern (EST))
  - Summer (DST): UTC-4 (EDT)
- ZIP Codes: 14143 (Stafford); 14020 (Batavia); 14422 (Byron); 14416 (Bergen); 14482 (Le Roy); 14525 (Pavilion); 14054 (East Bethany)
- Area code: 585
- FIPS code: 36-037-70607
- GNIS feature ID: 0979517
- Website: Town of Stafford

Stafford is a town in Genesee County, New York, United States. The population was 2,424 at the 2020 census. The town was named after a town of the same name in England.

Stafford is one of only two interior towns in Genesee County, lying in the east central part of the county, east of Batavia.

== History ==
The town was first settled in 1798, one of the first of the towns in the Holland Purchase to be occupied. Stafford was formed in 1820 from parts of the towns of Batavia and Le Roy. Part of Stafford was taken to form the town of Pavilion in 1842. The historic core at the hamlet of Stafford was listed on the National Register of Historic Places as the Stafford Village Four Corners Historic District in 1985.

== Geography ==
According to the United States Census Bureau, the town has a total area of 31.2 square miles (81 km^{2}), of which 31.1 square miles (81 km^{2}) is land and 0.1 square miles (0.26 km^{2}), or 0.35%, is water.

The New York State Thruway (Interstate 90) runs through the northern part of the town. The southern terminus of New York State Route 237 is at New York State Route 5 in Stafford. New York State Route 33 crosses the northern part of the town, intersecting NY-237 north of the Thruway.

Oatka Creek, Black Creek, and Bigelow Creek cross the town.

== Demographics ==
Historical population
| Census | Pop. | Note | %± |
|---|---|---|---|
| 1820 | 2,069 | | — |
| 1830 | 2,367 | | 14.4% |
| 1840 | 2,561 | | 8.2% |
| 1850 | 1,974 | | −22.9% |
| 1860 | 2,077 | | 5.2% |
| 1870 | 1,847 | | −11.1% |
| 1880 | 1,808 | | −2.1% |
| 1890 | 1,625 | | −10.1% |
| 1900 | 1,338 | | −17.7% |
| 1910 | 1,288 | | −3.7% |
| 1920 | 1,057 | | −17.9% |
| 1930 | 1,231 | | 16.5% |
| 1940 | 1,246 | | 1.2% |
| 1950 | 1,355 | | 8.7% |
| 1960 | 2,005 | | 48.0% |
| 1970 | 2,461 | | 22.7% |
| 1980 | 2,508 | | 1.9% |
| 1990 | 2,593 | | 3.4% |
| 2000 | 2,409 | | −7.1% |
| 2010 | 2,459 | | 2.1% |
| 2020 | 2,424 | | −1.4% |
U.S. Decennial Census

As of the census of 2000, there were 2,409 people, 909 households, and 695 families residing in the town. The population density was 77.4 inhabitants per square mile (29.9/km^{2}). There were 997 housing units at an average density of 32.0 per square mile (12.4/km^{2}). The racial makeup of the town was 97.72% White, 1.08% African American, 0.33% Native American, 0.17% Asian, 0.08% Pacific Islander, 0.12% from other races, and 0.50% from two or more races. Hispanic or Latino of any race were 0.25% of the population.

There were 909 households, out of which 31.2% had children under the age of 18 living with them, 66.3% were married couples living together, 6.4% had a female householder with no husband present, and 23.5% were non-families. 18.7% of all households were made up of individuals, and 7.8% had someone living alone who was 65 years of age or older. The average household size was 2.65 and the average family size was 3.03.

In the town, the population was spread out, with 24.0% under the age of 18, 7.1% from 18 to 24, 27.1% from 25 to 44, 27.4% from 45 to 64, and 14.4% who were 65 years of age or older. The median age was 40 years. For every 100 females, there were 101.6 males. For every 100 females age 18 and over, there were 101.8 males.

The median income for a household in the town was $49,516, and the median income for a family was $54,667. Males had a median income of $35,548 versus $24,375 for females. The per capita income for the town was $19,775. About 3.0% of families and 3.7% of the population were below the poverty line, including 2.1% of those under age 18 and 3.4% of those age 65 or over.

== Notable people ==
- Lafayette C. Baker, notable investigator, spy
- Jason DiSalvo, motorcycle/sport bike racer
- Harmon J. Fisk, former Wisconsin State Assemblyman
- Archie D. Sanders, former US congressman

== Communities and locations in Stafford ==
- Black Creek – A stream in the northeast part of the town.
- Godfrey Pond – A pond in the northwest corner of Stafford.
- Horseshoe Lake – A small lake near the western town line.
- Morganville – A hamlet in the center of the town on Route 237, north of Stafford village. It was named after William Morgan.
- Oatka Creek – A stream flowing through the southeast part of the town.
- Roanoke (formerly "Orangeburgh") – A location in the southeast corner of the town, near Oatka Creek on the Betheny-Le Roy Road.
- Stafford (once known as "Transit Store House") – A hamlet near the junction of Routes 5 and 237.
