= Clarendon-Linden fault system =

Geological feature

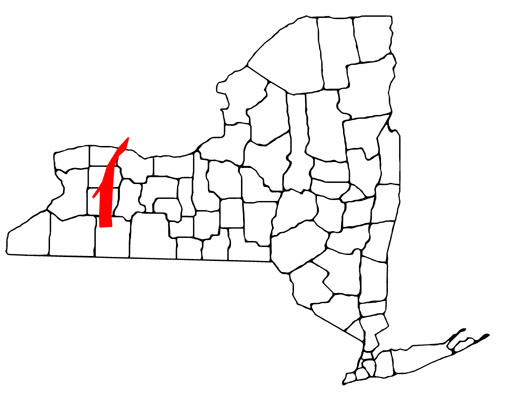
Location of the Clarendon-Linden fault system in Western New York

The Clarendon-Linden fault system is a major series of fault lines in western New York state, in the United States. It extends through Orleans, Genesee, Wyoming, and into Allegany counties and is responsible for much of the seismic activity in the region.

The system is named in part for the town of Clarendon, New York, which is located in Orleans County.
