= Clarendon, New York =

Clarendon, New York Farwell's Mills
- Town
- Location in Orleans County and the state of New York.

- Location of New York in the United States
- Coordinates: 43°10′28″N 78°3′15″W
- Country: United States
- State: New York
- County: Orleans

Area
  - Total: 35.22 sq mi (91.22 km^{2})
  - Land: 35.22 sq mi (91.22 km^{2})
  - Water: 0 sq mi (0.00 km^{2})
- Elevation: 610 ft (186 m)

Population (2010)
  - Total: 3,648
  - Estimate (2016): 3,529
  - Density: 100.2/sq mi (38.69/km^{2})
- Time zone: UTC-5 (Eastern (EST))
  - Summer (DST): UTC-4 (EDT)
- ZIP code: 14429
- Area code: 585
- FIPS code: 36-15880
- GNIS feature ID: 0978830
- Website: Town website

Clarendon is a town in Orleans County, New York, United States. The population was 3,648 at the 2010 census. The name is derived from Clarendon, Vermont.

The Town of Clarendon is in the southeast part of the county. New York State Route 31A and New York State Route 237 intersect in the town.

== History ==
The town was first settled circa 1811. The Town of Clarendon was created in 1820 from the town of Sweden, before Orleans County was established. It was originally known as "Farwell's Mills," a name derived from one of the first settlers, who arrived in 1810. Clarendon was once noted for its quarries and cement plants.

In late 2006, a stone church was demolished, due to a disagreement between the current owner and the town board. This historical church was built circa 1830 and served the community until 1980 when the church's contents were sold off. shortly after it was turned into an antiques & book shop. The church was a landmark for Clarendon for many years. The present owner of the property where the church once stood has retained the original bell which was manufactured in Troy, New York by the Meneely Bell Company. Sometime around 1990 the volunteer fire department, which at the time stood next to the church, burned almost to the ground.

The Butterfield Cobblestone House and Clarendon Stone Store are listed on the National Register of Historic Places.

== Geography ==
According to the United States Census Bureau, the town has a total area of 35.2 square miles (91 km^{2}), all land.

The east town line is the border of Monroe County (Town of Sweden). The southern boundary is the border of Genesee County, (Town of Byron).

The Clarendon-Linden fault system is named in part for Clarendon; the fault produces a prominent rise in the topography just west of Route 237.

== Demographics ==
Historical population
| Census | Pop. | Note | %± |
|---|---|---|---|
| 1830 | 2,025 | | — |
| 1840 | 2,251 | | 11.2% |
| 1850 | 1,809 | | −19.6% |
| 1860 | 1,831 | | 1.2% |
| 1870 | 1,668 | | −8.9% |
| 1880 | 1,797 | | 7.7% |
| 1890 | 1,731 | | −3.7% |
| 1900 | 1,518 | | −12.3% |
| 1910 | 1,335 | | −12.1% |
| 1920 | 1,139 | | −14.7% |
| 1930 | 1,224 | | 7.5% |
| 1940 | 1,176 | | −3.9% |
| 1950 | 1,287 | | 9.4% |
| 1960 | 1,659 | | 28.9% |
| 1970 | 1,969 | | 18.7% |
| 1980 | 2,148 | | 9.1% |
| 1990 | 2,705 | | 25.9% |
| 2000 | 3,392 | | 25.4% |
| 2010 | 3,648 | | 7.5% |
| 2016 (est.) | 3,529 | | −3.3% |
U.S. Decennial Census

As of the census of 2000, there were 3,392 people, 1,230 households, and 928 families residing in the town. The population density was 96.3 inhabitants per square mile (37.2/km^{2}). There were 1,331 housing units at an average density of 37.8 per square mile (14.6/km^{2}). The racial makeup of the town was 96.46% White, 0.94% African American, 0.41% Native American, 0.50% Asian, 0.62% from other races, and 1.06% from two or more races. Hispanic or Latino of any race were 1.62% of the population.

There were 1,230 households, out of which 36.3% had children under the age of 18 living with them, 62.3% were married couples living together, 8.5% had a female householder with no husband present, and 24.5% were non-families. 18.5% of all households were made up of individuals, and 5.4% had someone living alone who was 65 years of age or older. The average household size was 2.76 and the average family size was 3.15.

In the town, the population was spread out, with 28.5% under the age of 18, 6.6% from 18 to 24, 31.0% from 25 to 44, 24.6% from 45 to 64, and 9.3% who were 65 years of age or older. The median age was 36 years. For every 100 females, there were 100.8 males. For every 100 females age 18 and over, there were 98.4 males.

The median income for a household in the town was $46,667, and the median income for a family was $52,064. Males had a median income of $34,432 versus $22,545 for females. The per capita income for the town was $18,553. About 2.6% of families and 8.1% of the population were below the poverty line, including 10.8% of those under age 18 and 1.9% of those age 65 or over.

== Communities and locations in Clarendon ==
- Bennetts Corners – A hamlet east of Clarendon village on NY 31A.
- Clarendon – This hamlet, the original Farwell settlement, is centered on the intersection of NY 31A and NY 237.
- Honest Hill – A hamlet south of Clarendon village on NY 237.
- Manning – A hamlet, also previously known as "West Clarendon" or "Mudville," is located on NY 31A west of Clarendon village.

== Notable people ==
- Carl Akeley, (1864-1924), noted taxidermist, conservationist, and inventor. Akeley Hall in the American Museum of Natural History in New York City is named after him.
- Lemuel Cook, (1759-1866), last verifiable surviving veterans of the American Revolutionary War, moved to Clarendon in 1832, died there in 1866, and is buried there.
- Joseph Glidden, (1813-1906), businessman and inventor of barbed wire, lived in Clarendon prior to 1843.
- James Taylor Lewis, (1819-1904), attorney and politician, served as the ninth governor of Wisconsin.
