= Stafford Village Four Corners Historic District =

Historic district in New York, United States

- Stafford Village Four Corners; Historic District
- U.S. National Register of Historic Places
- U.S. Historic district
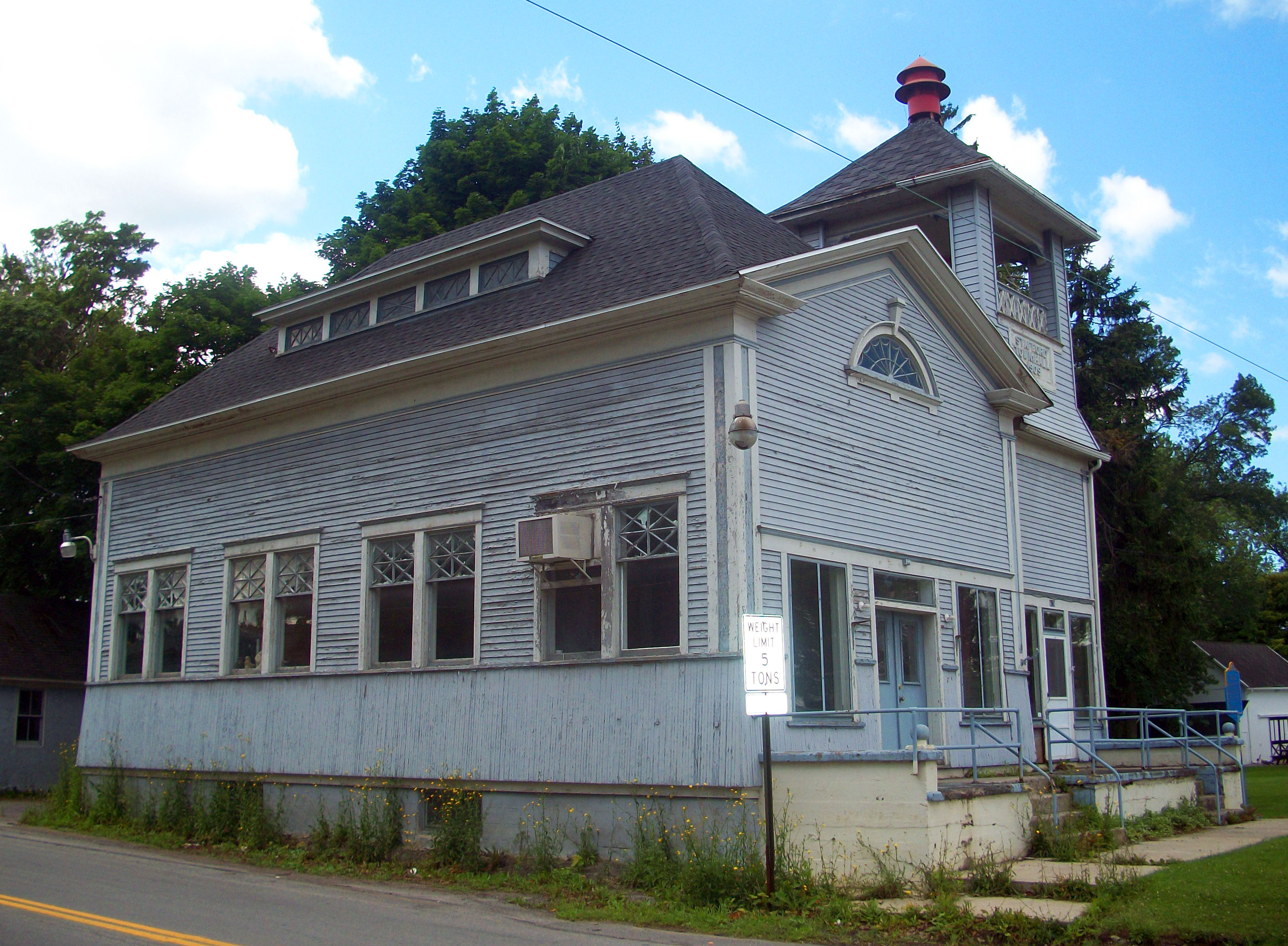
- East profile and north elevation of former Sander Store, 2010

- Location within New York Location within the United States
- Location: Stafford, NY
- Nearest city: Batavia
- Coordinates: 42°58′54″N 78°4′25″W
- Area: 5.7 acres (2.3 ha)
- Built: 1809–90
- Architect: Multiple
- Architectural style: Mixed (more Than 2 Styles From Different Periods)
- NRHP reference No.: 76001220
- Added to NRHP: October 08, 1976

The Stafford Village Four Corners Historic District is located at the junction of New York state routes 5 and 237 in Stafford, New York, United States. It is a collection of six buildings of various types from the 19th century, one of which is the oldest house in Genesee County.

Stafford was the first European settlement on the Holland Purchase, continuously occupied since 1798. Together the buildings constitute a well-preserved 19th century Western New York downtown. All the buildings are still used for their original purpose, save a store which was later converted to town hall. It was recognized as a historic district and listed on the National Register of Historic Places in 1976.

== Geography ==
The district is located at the intersection of the two highways, roughly midway between the larger communities of Batavia and Le Roy along Route 5. It is the southern terminus of Route 237, which leads to Morganville a short distance to the north. The area is a small hamlet of houses and commercial buildings amid a rural landscape of farm complexes and large worked fields, with a golf course to the north.

All four corners are within the boundaries of these 5.7 acres (2.3 ha). On the lots are six buildings. All are contributing wood frame structures built in the 19th century. They include two houses, two stores, a church and a seminary. A small park at the northeastern corner was the site of a hotel which burned down in the 1920s.

== History ==
Joseph Ellicott began his survey of the Holland Purchase, most of present-day Western New York, in 1798. He established a storehouse at the intersection of an old Iroquois trail and his eastern transit. The settlement quickly earned the name Transit, and a post office was established.

The next year a survey crew working for Ellicott was boarded there. While waiting for work to start, its leader, James Dewey, cleared land for a small vegetable garden. This was the first agricultural use of the Holland lands.

Frederick Walther, who had established an inn at the junction, wrote to Ellicott that the garden's yield was good, reflecting the quality of soil in the region. An 1800 map of that portion of the Holland lands denotes intersection as "Walther", likely since he was the only resident. By 1804 he had built a Federal style inn just north of the Indian trail.

Five years later, in 1809, the Marvin-Radley-Diefendorf House was built in the same style on the southwest corner of the junction. Unlike the inn, it is extant, making it the oldest house in Genesee County. In 1822, settlement had advanced enough that the Town of Stafford was established. The Greek Revival Radley-Worthington House went up on the southeast corner in 1831.

St. Paul's Episcopal Church was built next door in the Carpenter Gothic style in 1841. That year, the junction dropped its original name of Transit and began being known as Stafford Four Corners, since it was the center of the town. Seven years later, in 1848, the Greek Revival seminary, now used as a parish house, was erected next to the church. Sanders Store came along two years afterward.

In 1890 the Odd Fellows Hall at the northwest corner, the newest contributing property, was built. Walther's hotel burned down in 1922. The site remained undeveloped, and is today a park with military memorials. No modern infill has been built within the district.

== Buildings ==
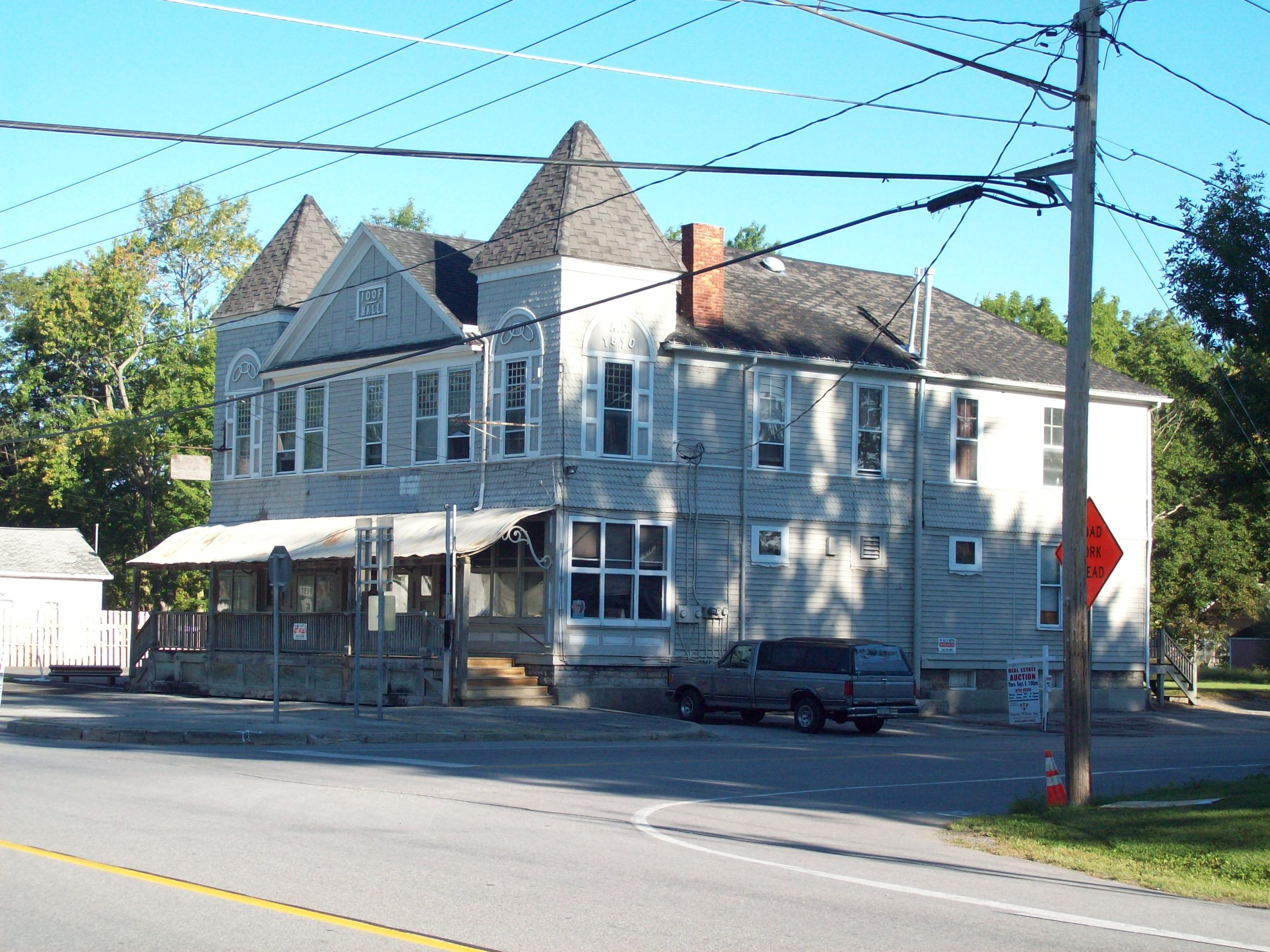
Odd Fellows Lodge #222

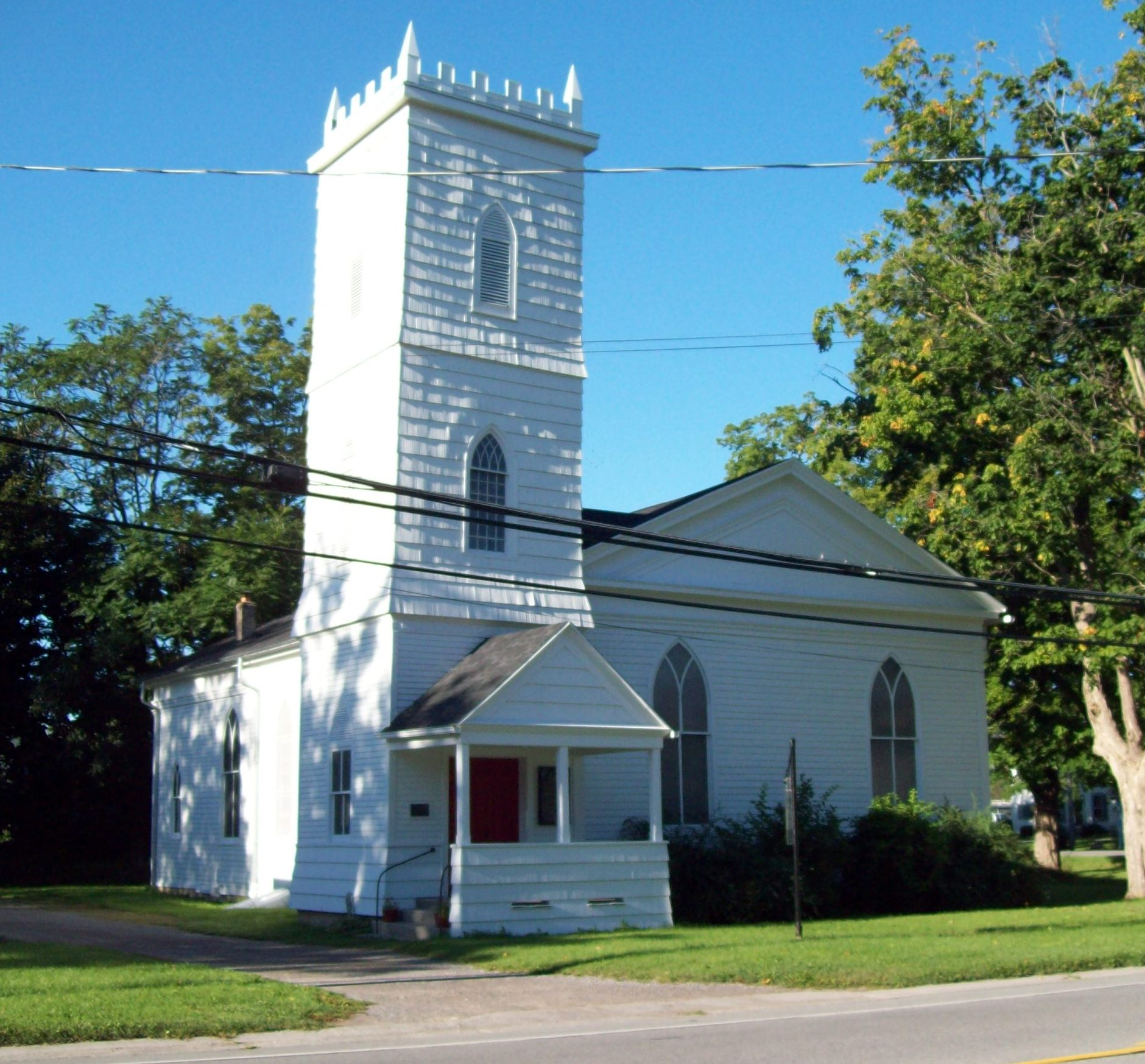
St. Paul's Episcopal Church

- Independent Order of Odd Fellows Lodge #222, on the northwest corner. This two-story 1890 building with a hipped roof, front gabled pediment and twin pyramidal towers was enlarged in the late 1910s. The south (front) facade has a metal canopy running the length of the first story and an unusual assortment of single and paired windows on the second. It still serves as a lodge, with stores on the lower level.
- Marvin-Radley-Diefendorf House, southwest of the Sanders Store on the southwest corner. The oldest portion of this two-story five-bay hip-roofed brick house dates to 1809. A central Palladian window tops a full-length porch on the north (front) elevation.
- Radley-Worthington House, southeast corner. An imposing front portico provides the entrance to this clapboard-sided one-story Greek Revival house built in 1831. Fluted Ionic columns support a dentilled architrave and large pediment, and a dentilled cornice with blank frieze runs the length of the house. Inside, the hallways have fluted engaged pilasters supporting an entablature and heavy flat cornice. One archway has a molded architrave with keystone. No architect is known, and it is likely that the owner, the Rev. Richard Radley, ordered these pieces from a catalog.
- St. Paul's Episcopal Church, east of the Radley House. This 1841 clapboard-sided house of worship combines a Greek Revival architrave and pediment with pointed Gothic windows. The three-stage square front tower is topped by a balustrade with small turrets at the corners.
- St. Paul's Seminary, next to the church. Now the parish house, this small Greek Revival building was originally a schoolhouse for the church. It became a seminary in 1852.
- Sanders Store, southwest corner. Originally it was built in 1850 for a general store. In 1907 it began several years of renovations to convert it to its later use as Stafford's town hall (it has been vacant since the town moved to a newer building a short distance to the north on Route 237). Its combination of hip and gabled roof is one feature that reflects a combination of Greek Revival and vernacular influences. Other decorative touches include a cornice with pilasters supporting a large architrave, fan window with leaded glass in the north (front) gable field, and hip-roofed dormer window with diagonally muntined windows on the east elevation. An open-belfry tower with pyramidal roof on the northeast corner supports a modern fire siren.

== See also ==
- National Register of Historic Places listings in Genesee County, New York
