= Phenacyl chloride =

Riot control agent

- Skeletal formula

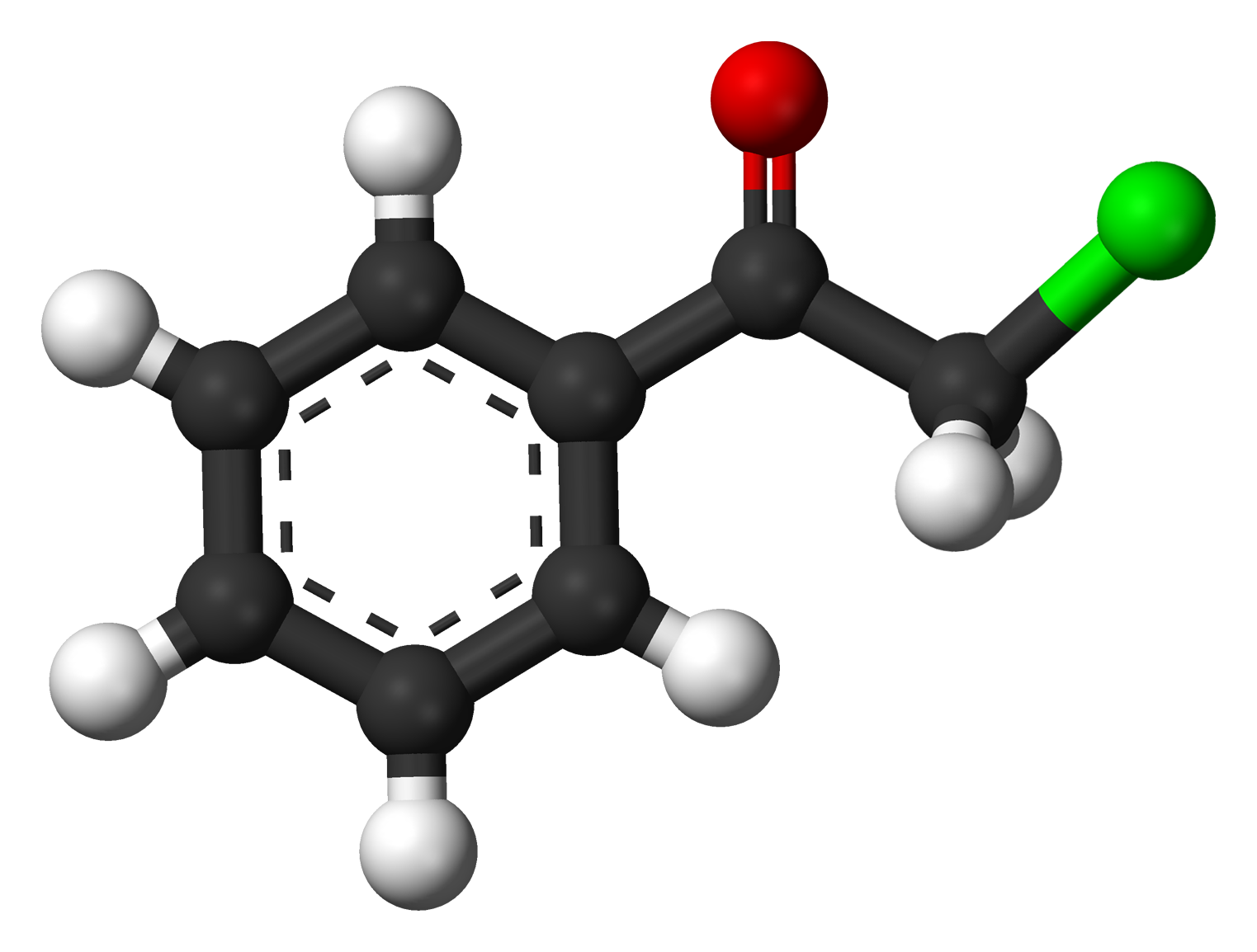
- Ball-and-stick model

Names
- Preferred IUPAC name 2-Chloro-1-phenylethan-1-one
- Other names 2-Chloro-1-phenylethanone α-Chloroacetophenone; 2-Chloroacetophenone; Chloromethyl phenyl ketone Phenyl chloromethyl ketone CN; Weeping gas Mace

Identifiers
CAS Number	532-27-4
3D model (JSmol)	Interactive image
ChEMBL	ChEMBL105712
ChemSpider	10303
ECHA InfoCard	100.007.757
IUPHAR/BPS	6285
PubChem CID	10757
UNII	88B5039IQG
CompTox Dashboard (EPA)	DTXSID9020293
- InChI: InChI=1S/C8H7ClO/c9-6-8(10)7-4-2-1-3-5-7/h1-5H,6H2
- SMILES: c1ccc(cc1)C(=O)CCl

Properties
Chemical formula	C_{8}H_{7}ClO
Molar mass	154.59 g·mol^{−1}
Appearance	white to gray crystalline solid
Odor	pungent and irritating
Density	1.324 g/cm^{3}
Melting point	54 to 56 °C (129 to 133 °F; 327 to 329 K)
Boiling point	244.5 °C (472.1 °F; 517.6 K)
Solubility in water	insoluble
Vapor pressure	0.005 mmHg (20 °C)

Hazards
- Occupational safety and health (OHS/OSH)
Main hazards	Combustible
- GHS labelling
Pictograms	(GHS05: Corrosive) (GHS06: Toxic) (GHS08: Health hazard)
Signal word	Danger
Hazard statements	H300, H311+H331, H315, H318, H334, H335
Precautionary statements	P280, P301+P310+P330, P302+P352+P312, P304+P340+P311, P305+P351+P338+P310
NFPA 704 (fire diamond)	3 1 0
Flash point	88 °C (190 °F; 361 K)
- Lethal dose or concentration (LD, LC)
LC_{Lo} (lowest published)	417 mg/m^{3} (rat, 15 min); 600 mg/m^{3} (mouse, 15 min); 465 mg/m^{3} (rabbit, 20 min); 490 mg/m^{3} (guinea pig, 30 min); 159 mg/m^{3} (human, 20 min); 850 mg/m^{3} (human, 10 min)
- NIOSH (US health exposure limits)
PEL (Permissible)	TWA 0.3 mg/m^{3} (0.05 ppm)
REL (Recommended)	TWA 0.3 mg/m^{3} (0.05 ppm)
IDLH (Immediate danger)	15 mg/m^{3}
- Except where otherwise noted, data are given for materials in their standard state (at 25 °C [77 °F], 100 kPa). verify (what is ?) Infobox references

Phenacyl chloride, also commonly known as chloroacetophenone, is a substituted acetophenone. It is a useful building block in organic chemistry. Apart from that, it has been historically used as a riot control agent, where it is designated CN. It should not be confused with cyanide, another agent used in chemical warfare, which has the chemical structure CN^{−}. Chloroacetophenone is thermally stable, and is the only tear agent that is distillable at ambient conditions.

== Preparation ==
Chloroacetophenone was first synthesized by Carl Graebe in 1871 by passing chlorine into boiling acetophenone.

Phenacyl chloride is readily available and was first prepared by chlorination of acetophenone vapour. It may also be synthesized by the Friedel-Crafts acylation of benzene using chloroacetyl chloride, with an aluminium chloride catalyst:

== Riot control agent ==
The Japanese made use of CN to suppress an indigenous rebellion in Taiwan in 1930. During the Second Sino-Japanese War, the Imperial Japanese Army used another irritating substance, diphenylchlorarsine against the Chinese instead.

Because of CN's significantly greater toxicity, CN has largely been supplanted for military use by CS gas. Even though CN is still supplied to paramilitary and police forces in a small pressurized aerosol known as “Mace” or tear gas, CN's use is falling because pepper spray both works and disperses more quickly than CN and is less toxic than CN.

The term "Mace" came into being because it was the brand-name invented by one of the first American manufacturers of CN aerosol sprays. Subsequently, in the United States, Mace became synonymous with tear-gas sprays in the same way that Kleenex has become strongly associated with facial tissues (a phenomenon known as a genericized trademark).

Like CS gas, this compound irritates the mucous membranes (oral, nasal, conjunctival and tracheobronchial). Sometimes it can give rise to more generalized reactions such as syncope, temporary loss of balance and orientation. More rarely, cutaneous irritating outbreaks have been observed and allergic contact permanent dermatitis.

At high concentrations, CN may cause corneal epithelial damage and chemosis. It has also accounted for at least five deaths, which have resulted from pulmonary injury and/or asphyxia.

TRPA1 (Transient Receptor Potential-Ankyrin 1) ion channel expressed on nociceptors (especially trigeminal) has been implicated as the site of action for CN, in vivo and in vitro.

== Applications ==
Known uses of phenacyl chloride include the following compounds: Bazinaprine, Myfadol, and Phenactropinium.

== See also ==
Phenacyl bromide
