= Dimethenamid =

Weed control herbicide

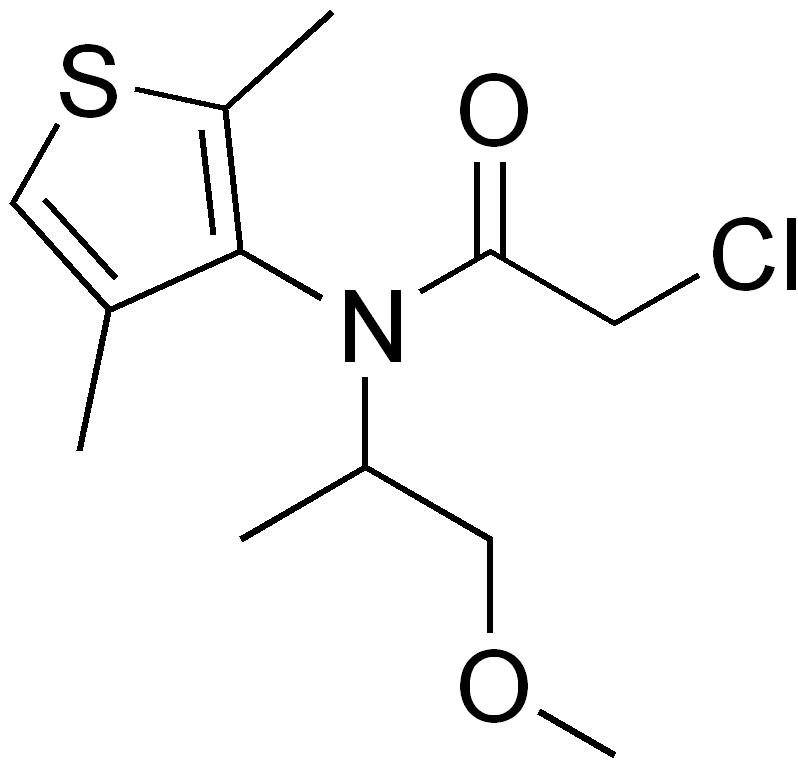

Names
- IUPAC name (RS)-2-Chloro-N-(2,4-dimethyl-3-thienyl)-N-(2-methoxy-1-methylethyl)acetamide
- Other names Frontier Herbicide; Dimethenamid-P ((S)-isomer)

Identifiers
CAS Number	87674-68-8
3D model (JSmol)	Interactive image; Interactive image
ChEBI	CHEBI:81789
ChemSpider	82842
ECHA InfoCard	100.121.887
EC Number	618-045-5
KEGG	C18499
PubChem CID	91744
RTECS number	AB5444200
UNII	8504Z6C4XZ
CompTox Dashboard (EPA)	DTXSID4032376
- InChI: InChI=1S/C12H18ClNO2S/c1-8-7-17-10(3)12(8)14(11(15)5-13)9(2)6-16-4/h7,9H,5-6H2,1-4H3 Key: JLYFCTQDENRSOL-UHFFFAOYSA-N; InChI=1/C12H18ClNO2S/c1-8-7-17-10(3)12(8)14(11(15)5-13)9(2)6-16-4/h7,9H,5-6H2,1-4H3 Key: JLYFCTQDENRSOL-UHFFFAOYAR
- SMILES: CC1=CSC(=C1N(C(C)COC)C(=O)CCl)C; ClCC(=O)N(c1c(scc1C)C)C(COC)C

Properties
Chemical formula	C_{12}H_{18}ClNO_{2}S
Molar mass	275.79 g/mol
Appearance	Tan to brown liquid
Density	1.141 g/cm^{3}

Hazards
- Occupational safety and health (OHS/OSH)
Main hazards	Xn (harmful)
- GHS labelling
Pictograms	(GHS07: Exclamation mark) (GHS09: Environmental hazard)
Signal word	Warning
Hazard statements	H302, H317, H332, H410, H411
Precautionary statements	P261, P264, P270, P271, P272, P273, P280, P301+P312, P302+P352, P304+P312, P304+P340, P312, P321, P330, P333+P313, P363, P391, P501
Flash point	151 °C (304 °F; 424 K)
Safety data sheet (SDS)	MSDS from BASF
- Except where otherwise noted, data are given for materials in their standard state (at 25 °C [77 °F], 100 kPa). verify (what is ?) Infobox references

Dimethenamid is a widely used herbicide belonging to the chloroacetamide class (group 15). Group 15 herbicides inhibit synthesis of certain long-chain fatty acids, thus reducing plant growth. In 2001, about 7 million pounds (3,200 t) of dimethenamid were used in the United States. Dimethenamid is registered for control of annual grasses, certain annual broadleaf weeds and sedges in field corn, seed corn, popcorn and soybeans. Supplemental labeling also allows use on sweet corn, grain sorghum, dry beans and peanuts. In registering dimethinamide (SAN 582H/Frontier), EPA concluded that the primary means of dissipation of dimethenamid applied to the soil surface is photolysis, whereas below the surface loss was due largely to microbial metabolism. The herbicide was found to undergo anaerobic microbial degradation under denitrifying, iron-reducing, sulfate-reducing, or methanogenic conditions. In that study, more than half of the herbicide carbon (based on ^{14}C-labeling) added was found to be incorporated irreversibly into soil-bound residue.
