= Holley, New York =

Holley Saltport
- Village
- Location in Orleans County and the state of New York.

- Location of New York in the United States
- Coordinates: 43°13′32″N 78°1′40″W
- Country: United States
- State: New York
- County: Orleans
- Town: Murray

Government
  - Mayor: Mark Bower

Area
  - Total: 1.27 sq mi (3.28 km^{2})
  - Land: 1.27 sq mi (3.28 km^{2})
  - Water: 0 sq mi (0.00 km^{2})
- Elevation: 541 ft (165 m)

Population (2020)
  - Total: 1,754
  - Density: 1,383.2/sq mi (534.04/km^{2})
- Time zone: UTC-5 (Eastern (EST))
  - Summer (DST): UTC-4 (EDT)
- ZIP code: 14470
- Area code: 585
- FIPS code: 36-35155
- GNIS feature ID: 0952995
- Website: Village website

Holley is a village in the town of Murray in Orleans County, New York, United States. The population was 1,811 at the 2010 census. According to the 2020 census, the population decreased to 1,754. It is part of the Rochester Metropolitan Statistical Area.

== History ==
The village of Holley was incorporated in 1850. Originally named Saltport, the name was changed to honor Myron Holley, a commissioner of the Erie Canal.

In 2002, a major chemical spill known as the Diaz pipeline incident occurred at the Diaz chemical production plant after a pipeline from a reactor vessel bursted, contaminating 31,000 tons of concrete and scrap metal as well as multiple houses, temporarily rendering Holley a ghost town.

The village of Holley hosted an annual "Hazzard County Squirrel Slam," from 2006 until the last event in 2016, a squirrel hunt that raises funds for the village's fire department. The event went off without incident for six consecutive years until the 2013 edition drew the sudden ire of a coalition of wildlife rehabilitators, animal rights activists and gun control advocates. Approximately 30 people stood outside of the Holley Fire Department to protest the event. Protests also occurred in 2014, 2015, and 2016. Several lawsuits to stop the event took place, none of which were successful. Due to the controversy, the "Squirrel Slam" hasn't taken place since 2016.

== Geography ==
According to the United States Census Bureau, the village has a total area of 1.3 square miles (3.4 km^{2}), all land.

Holley is located on the Erie Canal.

The village is located at the junction of east-west highway New York State Route 31 (West Albion Street and State Street) and north-south highway New York State Route 237 (North and South Main Street).

It is located approximately 21 miles from Rochester NY.

== Economy ==
Holley's main economy is farming based, due to the lack of trade in the area, as well as the growing townships nearby, such as Brockport and Albion. The town has small shops and businesses, including a dance studio, Kyokushin Karate dojo, a pizzeria, a diner and gas station.

== Education ==
There are two public schools in Holley: Holley Elementary School and Holley Junior/Senior High School. These two schools are located in close proximity to each other in the northeastern portion of the village.

Residents of the Holley School district currently pay the highest rate of school taxes in the county. The older high school, located in the center of town, was closed in 1976 due to a growing population that needed a larger facility and one closer to athletic fields. This building is now considered a historical landmark.

== Demographics ==
Historical population
Census	Pop.	Note	%±
1880	1,018		—
1890	1,381		35.7%
1900	1,380		−0.1%
1910	1,679		21.7%
1920	1,625		−3.2%
1930	1,588		−2.3%
1940	1,230		−22.5%
1950	1,551		26.1%
1960	1,788		15.3%
1970	1,868		4.5%
1980	1,882		0.7%
1990	1,890		0.4%
2000	1,802		−4.7%
2010	1,811		0.5%
2020	1,754		−3.1%
U.S. Decennial Census

As of the census of 2000, there were 1,802 people, 788 households, and 464 families residing in the village. The population density was 1,422.9 inhabitants per square mile (549.4/km^{2}). There were 846 housing units at an average density of 668.0 per square mile (257.9/km^{2}). The racial makeup of the village was 96.95% White, 1.22% African American, 0.11% Native American, 0.11% Asian, 0.72% from other races, and 0.89% from two or more races. Hispanic or Latino of any race were 2.61% of the population.

There were 788 households, out of which 32.7% had children under the age of 18 living with them, 42.0% were married couples living together, 12.6% had a female householder with no husband present, and 41.0% were non-families. 33.9% of all households were made up of individuals, and 13.5% had someone living alone who was 65 years of age or older. The average household size was 2.29 and the average family size was 2.95.

In the village, the population was spread out, with 26.5% under the age of 18, 8.5% from 18 to 24, 31.4% from 25 to 44, 21.4% from 45 to 64, and 12.2% who were 65 years of age or older. The median age was 35 years. For every 100 females, there were 96.5 males. For every 100 females age 18 and over, there were 93.1 males.

The median income for a household in the village was $36,367, and the median income for a family was $49,200. Males had a median income of $31,019 versus $23,077 for females. The per capita income for the village was $17,388. About 7.6% of families and 10.2% of the population were below the poverty line, including 15.5% of those under age 18 and 11.5% of those age 65 or over.

== See also ==
- 2002 Diaz pipeline incident
