= New York State Route 237 =

State highway in western New York, US

New York State Route 237
- Map of western New York with NY 237 highlighted in red

Route information
- Maintained by NYSDOT and Orleans County
- Length: 28.38 mi (45.67 km)
- Existed: 1930–present

Major junctions
- South end: NY 5 in Stafford
- North end: Lake Ontario State Parkway in Kendall

Location
- Country: United States
- State: New York
- Counties: Genesee, Orleans

Highway system
- New York Highways; Interstate; US; State; Reference; Parkways
← NY 236	→ NY 238

New York State Route 237 (NY 237) is a north–south state highway located in the western part of New York in the United States. The southern terminus of the route is at an intersection with NY 5 in Stafford. Its northern terminus is at an interchange with the Lake Ontario State Parkway immediately south of Lake Ontario in Kendall. NY 237 passes through mostly rural areas of Genesee and Orleans counties; however, it also passes through several small communities, including the village of Holley.

In the 1930 renumbering of state highways in New York, NY 237 was assigned to the portion of its modern alignment south of what is now NY 104 in Murray while the segment of modern NY 237 between current NY 104 and NY 18 was designated as New York State Route 385. NY 237 was extended northward to Kendall c. 1932, replacing NY 385. It was extended northward once more in the early 1970s to meet the Lake Ontario State Parkway.

== Route description ==
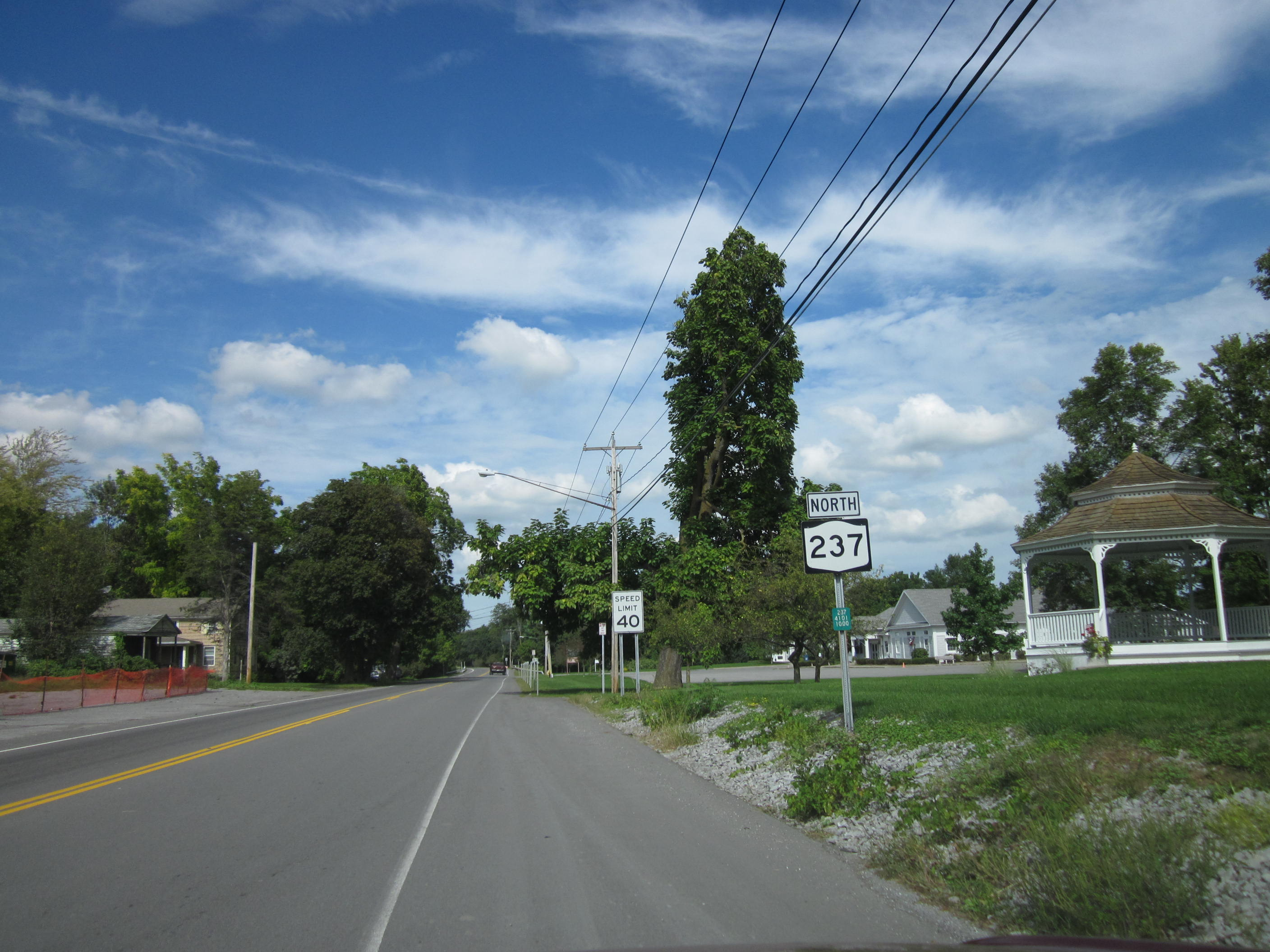
NY 237 proceeding north from NY 5 in Stafford

NY 237 begins at an intersection with NY 5 east of Batavia in the Genesee County town of Stafford. It heads northward from the hamlet of Stafford as Morganville Road, traversing open fields on its way to the hamlet of Morganville 1 mile (1.6 km) to the north. Here, the route takes on a northeast alignment for a brief distance before resuming a northerly alignment as it exits the community. North of Morganville, NY 237 crosses open terrain and passes over the New York State Thruway (Interstate 90) ahead of an isolated junction (formerly known as Pea Viner Corners) with NY 33—which parallels the Thruway along this stretch—near the northern town line. The route continues north into the town of Byron and the hamlet of South Byron, a small community built up around the CSX Transportation-owned Rochester Subdivision. NY 237 quickly proceeds through South Byron, passing under the railroad line on its way toward the hamlet of Byron.

In the center of Byron, NY 237 meets NY 262, which becomes county-maintained as the eastern segment of County Route 13 (CR 13) east of NY 237. Past NY 262, NY 237 proceeds through the residential northern outskirts of the hamlet to Pumpkin Hill, the last community that NY 237 enters prior to crossing into Orleans County. Outside of Pumpkin Hill, the route passes through sparsely developed areas of Byron and Clarendon, serving the small hamlet of Honest Hill in the southern portion of the latter. NY 237 continues north to the hamlet of Clarendon, situated at the junction of NY 237 and NY 31A. At this point, NY 237 turns to follow a more northeasterly alignment toward the village of Holley, the largest community on NY 237. After another 2.5 miles (4.0 km) of rural surroundings, the route enters the Holley village limits in the town of Murray, becoming South Main Street and turning back to the north upon passing under the Falls Road Railroad south of the village center.

The highway continues north along South Main Street for three blocks to the center of Holley, where it intersects NY 31 northwest of the village's business district. NY 237 continues on as North Main Street, passing by the Holley Central School District's elementary and high schools and crossing over the Erie Canal before exiting the mostly residential village. Now named North Main Street Road, NY 237 continues generally northward through rural portions of Murray to a junction with NY 104 (Ridge Road). NY 237 turns west here, following NY 104 for just under 1 mile (1.6 km) to the hamlet of Murray, where NY 237 breaks from NY 104 and continues north into the town of Kendall as Kendall Road.

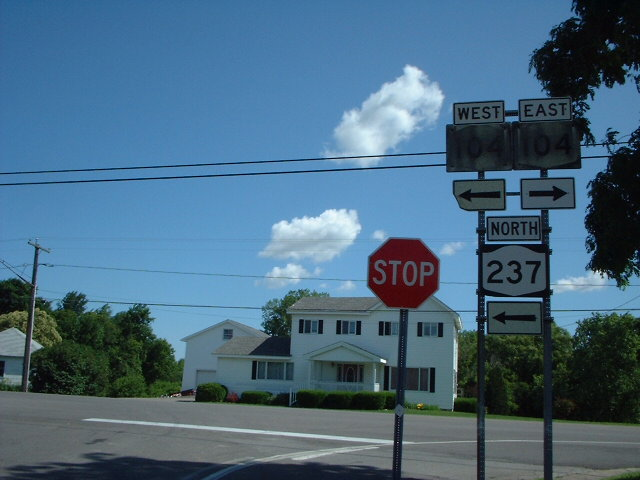
NY 237 at the junction with NY 104 in Murray

In Kendall, NY 237 heads north across mostly undeveloped areas to the vicinity of the town center, where it enters a more residential area as it meets NY 18 south of the hamlet of Kendall. NY 237 proceeds northward into Kendall itself, passing Kendall Elementary School and serving the community's center before continuing into another rural area of the town of Kendall. The route traverses another 2 miles (3.2 km) of open fields toward the Lake Ontario shoreline, where NY 237 comes to an end at an interchange with the Lake Ontario State Parkway. Although NY 237 terminates here, Kendall Road continues northward for another 300 yards (274 m) to serve a pair of lakeside communities.

== History ==
NY 237 was assigned as part of the 1930 renumbering of state highways in New York to the portion of its current alignment south of then-NY 31 (now NY 104). At the same time, the portion of modern NY 237 between NY 104 and NY 18 was designated as NY 385. The NY 385 designation was short-lived, however, as it became part of an extended NY 237 c. 1932. The route was extended again in the early 1970s to meet the Lake Ontario State Parkway at an interchange on the shoreline of Lake Ontario. This extension of NY 237 is maintained by Orleans County as CR 57A from NY 18 to Carr Road and as CR 70 north of Carr Road. Both county route designations are unsigned. While NY 237 ends at the parkway, CR 70 continues northward for an additional 0.25 miles (0.40 km) to a dead end at Lake Ontario.

== Major intersections ==
County	Location	mi	km	Destinations	Notes
Genesee	Stafford	0.00	0.00	NY 5 (Main Road)	Southern terminus; hamlet of Stafford
Genesee	Stafford	3.43	5.52	NY 33 (Clinton Street) – Rochester, Batavia	
Genesee	Byron	6.98	11.23	NY 262	Hamlet of Byron
Orleans	Clarendon	14.93	24.03	NY 31A (East Lee Road / Fourth Section Road) – Brockport	Hamlet of Clarendon
Orleans	Holley	18.01	28.98	NY 31 (West Albion Street / Wright Street)	
Orleans	Murray	20.87	33.59	NY 104 east (Ridge Road) – Rochester	Eastern terminus of NY 104 / NY 237 overlap
Orleans	Murray	21.76	35.02	NY 104 west (Ridge Road)	Western terminus of NY 104 / NY 237 overlap; hamlet of Murray
Orleans	Kendall	25.10	40.39	NY 18 (Roosevelt Highway)	
Orleans	Kendall	28.38	45.67	Lake Ontario State Parkway	Interchange; northern terminus
1.000 mi = 1.609 km; 1.000 km = 0.621 mi: Concurrency terminus

== See also ==
- List of county routes in Orleans County, New York
