= Acetochlor =

Weed control herbicide

Names
- Preferred IUPAC name 2-Chloro-N-(ethoxymethyl)-N-(2-ethyl-6-methylphenyl)acetamide
- Other names Azetochlor; CP55097; ICIA-5676

Identifiers
| CAS Number | 34256-82-1 |
| 3D model (JSmol) | Interactive image |
| ChEBI | CHEBI:2394 |
| ChEMBL | ChEMBL1517425 |
| ChemSpider | 1911 |
| ECHA InfoCard | 100.047.166 |
| KEGG | C10925 |
| PubChem CID | 1988 |
| UNII | 8L08WMO94K |
| CompTox Dashboard (EPA) | DTXSID8023848 |
- InChI: InChI=1S/C14H20ClNO2/c1-4-12-8-6-7-11(3)14(12)16(10-18-5-2)13(17)9-15/h6-8H,4-5,9-10H2,1-3H3 Key: VTNQPKFIQCLBDU-UHFFFAOYSA-N; InChI=1/C14H20ClNO2/c1-4-12-8-6-7-11(3)14(12)16(10-18-5-2)13(17)9-15/h6-8H,4-5,9-10H2,1-3H3 Key: VTNQPKFIQCLBDU-UHFFFAOYAJ
- SMILES: ClCC(=O)N(c1c(cccc1CC)C)COCC

Properties
| Chemical formula | C_{14}H_{20}ClNO_{2} |
| Molar mass | 269.77 g·mol^{−1} |
| Density | 1.100 at 30 °C; 1.136 at 20 °C |
| Melting point | < 0 °C (32 °F; 273 K) |
| Solubility in water | 223 ppm |

Hazards
| Flash point | > 100 °C (212 °F; 373 K) |
- Except where otherwise noted, data are given for materials in their standard state (at 25 °C [77 °F], 100 kPa). Infobox references

Acetochlor is an herbicide developed by Monsanto Company and Zeneca. It is a member of the class of herbicides known as chloroacetanilides. Its mode of action is elongase inhibition, and inhibition of geranylgeranyl pyrophosphate (GGPP) cyclization enzymes, part of the gibberellin pathway. It carries high risks of environmental contamination.

== Manufacture ==
Acetochlor is manufactured in two steps from 2-ethyl-6-methylaniline. A reaction with chloroacetyl chloride gives an anilide which is treated with chloromethyl ethyl ether and sodium hydroxide to form the herbicide.

== Uses ==
In the United States, acetochlor was registered by the EPA as a direct substitute for many herbicides of known concern. The EPA imposed several restrictions and conditions on the use of acetochlor.

It is approved for pre-emergence application or for pre-planting application with soil incorporation, in corn. (maize) at 5 litres / hectare (1835g / hectare of a.i.) It is the main active ingredient in Acenit, Keystone, Guardian, Harness, Relay, Sacemid, Surpass, Top-Hand, Trophy and Winner.

It is used to control weeds in corn, and is particularly useful as a replacement for atrazine in the case of some important weeds.

=== Internationally ===
It is also registered in South Africa.

== Safety ==
Acetochlor has been classified as a probable human carcinogen. Acetochlor, as alachlor, can cause nasal turbinate tumors via the generation of a common tissue reactive metabolite that leads to cytotoxicity and regenerative proliferation in the nasal epithelium.

It is a thyroid disruptor.

Human health effects from acetochlor at low environmental doses or at biomonitored levels from low environmental exposures are unknown. A case of poisoning with extremely swollen genitals as a symptom was reported after contact.

=== Ecologic effects ===
In the United States, acetochlor is the third most frequently detected herbicide in natural waters.

Acetochlor can accelerate metamorphosis in amphibians. It can also affect the development of fish.

== See also ==
- Metolachlor
