= Butachlor =

Weed control herbicide

Names
- Preferred IUPAC name N-(Butoxymethyl)-2-chloro-N-(2,6-diethylphenyl)acetamide

Identifiers
CAS Number	23184-66-9
3D model (JSmol)	Interactive image
ChEBI	CHEBI:3230
ChEMBL	ChEMBL1399036
ChemSpider	29376
ECHA InfoCard	100.041.328
EC Number	245-477-8
KEGG	C10931
PubChem CID	31677
UNII	94NU90OO5K
CompTox Dashboard (EPA)	DTXSID3034402
- InChI: InChI=1S/C17H26ClNO2/c1-4-7-11-21-13-19(16(20)12-18)17-14(5-2)9-8-10-15(17)6-3/h8-10H,4-7,11-13H2,1-3H3
- SMILES: ClCC(=O)N(c1c(cccc1CC)CC)COCCCC

Properties
Chemical formula	C_{17}H_{26}ClNO_{2}
Molar mass	311.85 g·mol^{−1}
Appearance	Light yellow oil
Density	1.0695 g/cm^{3}
Solubility in water	20 mg/L (20 °C)

Hazards
- GHS labelling
Pictograms	(GHS06: Toxic) (GHS07: Exclamation mark) (GHS09: Environmental hazard)
Signal word	Danger
Hazard statements	H302, H317, H331, H410
Precautionary statements	P261, P264, P270, P271, P272, P273, P280, P301+P312, P302+P352, P304+P340, P311, P321, P330, P333+P313, P363, P391, P403+P233, P405, P501
Flash point	100 °C (212 °F; 373 K)
- Lethal dose or concentration (LD, LC)
LD_{50} (median dose)	1740 mg/kg (oral, rat)
- Except where otherwise noted, data are given for materials in their standard state (at 25 °C [77 °F], 100 kPa). Infobox references

Butachlor is a herbicide of the acetanilide class. It is used as a selective pre-emergent herbicide to control annual grasses and some broad-leaved weeds. It was introduced circa 1970. It is extensively used in India in the form of granules and emulsifiable concentrate in rice as post emergence herbicide, and 2,699 tonnes (5,950,000 lb) was sold in India in 2005-06, declining to 372 tonnes (820,000 lb) in 2009-10.

It is used in Uganda.

Butachlor's herbicide mode of action is to prevent formation of very long chain fatty acids; this makes its HRAC classification Group K (Australia), Group K3 (global) and Group 15 (numeric).

== Application ==
Butachlor is typically applied at 1.25-2 kg/ha active ingredient.

== Links ==
- Butachlor in the Pesticide Properties DataBase (PPDB)
