= Metolachlor =

Weed control herbicide

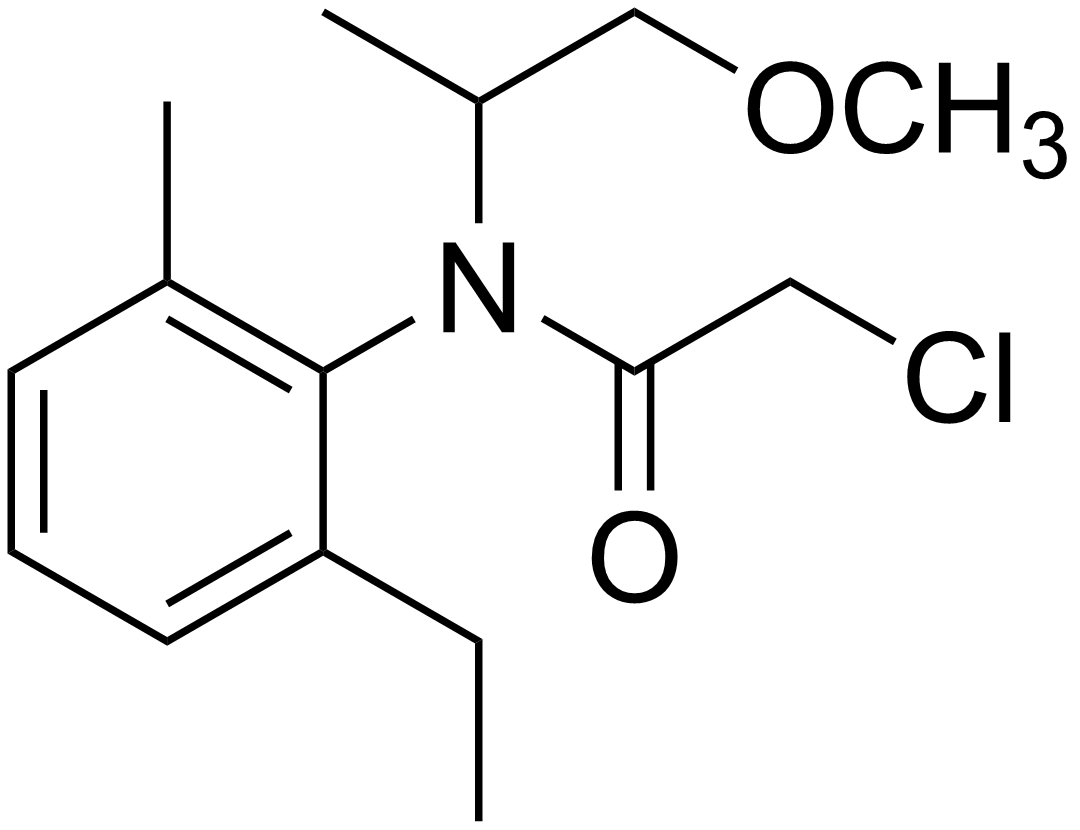

Names
- IUPAC name (RS)-2-Chloro-N-(2-ethyl-6-methyl-phenyl)-N-(1-methoxypropan-2-yl)acetamide
- Other names Dual, Pimagram, Bicep, CGA-24705, Pennant.

Identifiers
CAS Number	51218-45-2
3D model (JSmol)	Interactive image
ChEBI	CHEBI:6902
ChEMBL	ChEMBL1884974
ChemSpider	4025
ECHA InfoCard	100.051.856
KEGG	C10953
PubChem CID	4169
UNII	X0I01K05X2
CompTox Dashboard (EPA)	DTXSID4022448
- InChI: InChI=1S/C15H22ClNO2/c1-5-13-8-6-7-11(2)15(13)17(14(18)9-16)12(3)10-19-4/h6-8,12H,5,9-10H2,1-4H3 Key: WVQBLGZPHOPPFO-UHFFFAOYSA-N; InChI=1/C15H22ClNO2/c1-5-13-8-6-7-11(2)15(13)17(14(18)9-16)12(3)10-19-4/h6-8,12H,5,9-10H2,1-4H3 Key: WVQBLGZPHOPPFO-UHFFFAOYAS
- SMILES: CCc1cccc(c1N(C(C)COC)C(=O)CCl)C

Properties
Chemical formula	C_{15}H_{22}ClNO_{2}
Molar mass	283.80 g·mol^{−1}
Appearance	Off-white to colorless liquid
Density	1.1 g/mL
Boiling point	100 °C (212 °F; 373 K) at 0.001 mmHg
Solubility in water	530 ppm at 20 °C

Hazards
- Occupational safety and health (OHS/OSH)
- Main hazards
- Except where otherwise noted, data are given for materials in their standard state (at 25 °C [77 °F], 100 kPa). verify (what is ?) Infobox references

Metolachlor is an organic compound that is widely used as an herbicide. It is a derivative of aniline and is a member of the chloroacetanilide family of herbicides. It is highly effective toward grasses.

It is used in Australia, Uganda and India.

== Agricultural use ==
Metolachlor was developed by Ciba-Geigy, first synthesised in 1972 and registered in 1977. It acts by inhibition of elongases and of the geranylgeranyl pyrophosphate (GGPP) cyclases, which are part of the gibberellin pathway. It is used for grass and broadleaf weed control in corn, soybean, peanuts, sorghum, and cotton. It is also used in combination with other herbicides.

Metolachlor is a popular herbicide in the United States. As originally formulated metolachlor was applied as a racemate, a 1:1 mixture of the (S)- and (R)-stereoisomers. The (R)-enantiomer is less active, and modern production methods afford a higher concentration of S-metolachlor, thus current application rates are far lower than original formulations.

An estimated 60–65 million pounds (27,000–29,000 t), by active ingredient, of metolachlor are used annually in the USA, as of 1999.

== Production and basic structure ==
Metolachlor is produced from 2-ethyl-6-methylaniline (MEA) via condensation with methoxyacetone. The resulting imine is hydrogenated to give primarily the S-stereoisomeric amine. This secondary amine is acetylated with chloroacetylchloride. Because of the steric effects of the 2,6-disubstituted aniline, rotation about the aryl-C to N bond is restricted. Thus, both the (R)- and the (S)-enantiomers exist as atropisomers. Both atropisomers of (S)-metolachlor exhibit the same biological activity.

The four stereoisomers of metolachlor

== Safety and ecological effects ==
The European Chemicals Agency classified metolachlor as a suspected human carcinogen (Carcinogen category 2) in 2022. The United States Environmental Protection Agency (US EPA) has classified Metolachlor as a Group C, possible human carcinogen, based on liver tumors in rats at the highest dose tested (HDT). Evidence of the bioaccumulation of metolachlor in edible species of fish as well as its adverse effect on the growth and development has raised concerns on its effects on human and environmental health. For example, products with this active ingredient are restricted to professional licensed applicators in the U.S. state of Massachusetts. Though there is no set maximum concentration (maximum contaminant level, MCL) for metolachlor that is allowed in drinking water, the US EPA does have a health advisory level (HAL) of 0.525 mg/L. Metolachlor has been detected in ground and surface waters in concentrations ranging from 0.08 to 4.5 parts per billion (ppb) throughout the U.S.

Metolachlor induces cytotoxic and genotoxic effects in human lymphocytes. Genotoxic effects have also been observed in tadpoles exposed to metolachlor. Evidence also reveals that metolachlor affects cell growth. Cell division in yeast was reduced, and chicken embryos exposed to metolchlor showed a significant decrease in the average body mass compared to the control.

== See also ==
- Acetochlor
- Alachlor
