= Delachlor =

Weed control herbicide

Names
- IUPAC name 2-Chloro-2′,6′-dimethyl-N-[(2-methylpropoxy)methyl]acetanilide
- Preferred IUPAC name 2-Chloro-N-(2,6-dimethylphenyl)-N-[(2-methylpropoxy)methyl]acetamide
- Other names: CP 52 223 (development code); 2-Chloro-N-(2,6-dimethylphenyl)-N-[(2-methylpropoxy)methyl]acetamide; делахлор (Russian); délachlore (French); 异丁草胺 (Chinese)

Identifiers
| CAS Number | 24353-58-0 |
| 3D model (JSmol) | Interactive image |
| ChEBI | CHEBI:82177 |
| ChemSpider | 29961 |
| KEGG | C19050 |
| PubChem CID | 32321 |
| UNII | XQZ88T1A4A |
| CompTox Dashboard (EPA) | DTXSID2041836 |
- InChI: InChI=1S/C15H22ClNO2/c1-11(2)9-19-10-17(14(18)8-16)15-12(3)6-5-7-13(15)4/h5-7,11H,8-10H2,1-4H3 Key: BIQOEDQVNIYWPQ-UHFFFAOYSA-N
- SMILES: CC1=C(C(=CC=C1)C)N(COCC(C)C)C(=O)CCl

Properties
| Chemical formula | C_{15}H_{22}ClNO_{2} |
| Molar mass | 283.80 g·mol^{−1} |
| Appearance | colourless or very pale yellow |
| Density | 1.101 |
| Solubility in water | 59 ppm |

Hazards
- GHS labelling
| Signal word | Warning |
| Hazard statements | H302, H312, H315, H317, H319, H332, H351, H361f, H373, H410 |
| Precautionary statements | P260, P264, P273, P280, P391, P501 |
- Lethal dose or concentration (LD, LC)
| LD_{50} (median dose) | 1775 mg/kg (mouse, oral); 2000 mg/kg (rat, dermal) |
- Except where otherwise noted, data are given for materials in their standard state (at 25 °C [77 °F], 100 kPa). Infobox references

Delachlor is a chloroacetanilide herbicide, used on grasses, rice and sugarbeet. It was first reported in 1967 and introduced by Monsanto, though by 1974 commercial factors had halted its commercialisation, so delachlor is now considered obsolete, and appears never to have been registered in the USA.

Delachlor's HRAC group is Group K (Australia), Group K3 (Global) and Group 15 (numeric).

== Effectiveness ==
In artificial soil tests of phytotoxicity, with the herbicides cycloate, benzthiazuron and pyrazon. Delachlor was the most active in organic soils (>11% organics) though cycloate was more potent in other soils.

Delachlor appears to be used in China, where it has reportedly good control of goosegrass.

== Safety ==
The LD_{50} (by mouth) is reported to be 1775 mg/kg on an SDS, but 733 mg/kg on PPDB. The difference is similar to the difference between paracetamol and methanol.

== Chemistry ==
It is soluble in chloroform and somewhat soluble in ethyl acetate.
