= National Register of Historic Places listings in Genesee County, New York =

Location of Genesee County in New York

List of the National Register of Historic Places listings in Genesee County, New York

This is intended to be a complete list of properties and districts listed on the National Register of Historic Places in Genesee County, New York. The locations of National Register properties and districts (at least for all showing latitude and longitude coordinates below) may be seen in a map by clicking on "Map of all coordinates". One property, the Holland Land Office, is further designated a National Historic Landmark.

This National Park Service list is complete through NPS recent listings posted May 8, 2026.

Contents: Counties in New York
Albany (Albany) – Allegany – Bronx – Broome – Cattaraugus – Cayuga – Chautauqua – Chemung – Chenango – Clinton – Columbia – Cortland – Delaware – Dutchess (Poughkeepsie, Rhinebeck) – Erie (Buffalo) – Essex – Franklin – Fulton – Genesee – Greene – Hamilton – Herkimer – Jefferson – Kings – Lewis – Livingston – Madison – Monroe (Rochester) – Montgomery – Nassau – New York (Below 14th Street, 14th to 59th Streets, 59th to 110th Streets, Above 110th Street, Islands) – Niagara (Niagara Falls) – Oneida – Onondaga (Syracuse) – Ontario – Orange – Orleans – Oswego – Otsego – Putnam – Queens – Rensselaer – Richmond – Rockland – St. Lawrence – Saratoga – Schenectady – Schoharie – Schuyler – Seneca – Steuben – Suffolk – Sullivan – Tioga – Tompkins – Ulster – Warren – Washington – Wayne – Westchester (Northern, Southern, New Rochelle, Peekskill, Yonkers) – Wyoming – Yates

== Listings county-wide ==
	Name on the Register	Image	Date listed	Location	City or town	Description
1	Alexander Classical School	Alexander Classical School	October 25, 1973 (#73001191)	Buffalo St. 42°54′08″N 78°15′34″W	Alexander	Rare three-story-tall cobblestone structure, only one listed in county, was built as boarding school in 1837. Later it became a public school, and then town hall.
2	Batavia Cemetery	Batavia Cemetery	April 8, 2002 (#02000309)	Harvester Ave. 42°59′36″N 78°10′17″W	Batavia	Burials since 1823 include Joseph Ellicott, Albert and Arthur Brisbane, and large mausoleum of Dean Richmond. Tall monument near south side commemorates disappearance of Anti-Mason William Morgan in 1824.
3	Batavia Club	Batavia Club	June 19, 1973 (#73001192)	Main and Bank Sts. 42°59′51″N 78°10′55″W	Batavia	1831 Federal style brick building, originally a bank and now an arts center, is one of only two extant Hezekiah Eldredge buildings in New York
4	Batavia Veterans Administration Hospital	Batavia Veterans Administration Hospital	March 27, 2012 (#12000160)	222 Richmond Ave. 43°00′42″N 78°11′59″W	Batavia	United States Second Generation Veterans Hospitals Multiple Property Submission
5	First Presbyterian Church	First Presbyterian Church	December 6, 2004 (#04001339)	300 E. Main St. 42°59′55″N 78°10′46″W	Batavia	Church complex built from 1854 to 1919 reflects changing styles of American Protestant worship
6	First Presbyterian Church of Le Roy	First Presbyterian Church of Le Roy	September 10, 2014 (#14000577)	7 Clay St. 42°58′38″N 77°59′40″W	Le Roy	1825 church houses one of the earliest surviving congregations in area, established 1812
7	Genesee County Courthouse	Genesee County Courthouse	June 18, 1973 (#73001193)	Main and Ellicott Sts. 42°59′52″N 78°11′14″W	Batavia	Greek Revival limestone building from 1843 replaced original courthouse thad at one point had served entire Holland Purchase. Local materials used in construction; serves as focal point of courthouse historic district and western gateway to downtown
8	Genesee County Courthouse Historic District	Genesee County Courthouse Historic District	December 10, 1982 (#82001173)	Bounded by Porter and Jefferson Aves., and Main, Court, and Ellicott Sts. 42°59′53″N 78°11′14″W	Batavia	Civic core of Batavia, with five government buildings at fork of old Iroquois trails, built from the 1840s to 1920s.
9	Gifford-Walker Farm	Gifford-Walker Farm	January 10, 1980 (#80004276)	7083 N. Bergen Rd. 43°07′51″N 78°00′54″W	North Bergen	Intact 1870 Carpenter Gothic farmhouse
10	Holland Land Office	Holland Land Office	October 15, 1966 (#66000521)	W. Main St. 42°59′55″N 78°11′21″W	Batavia	1815 Greek Revival building was headquarters for original owners of Western New York
11	Keeney House	Keeney House	September 11, 1979 (#79001583)	13 W. Main St; 42°58′38″N 77°59′35″W	Le Roy	1820s Federal style house, later home to inventor of stringless bean. Later Greek Revival embellishments removed in early 20th-century renovation.
12	Lake Street Historic District	Lake Street Historic District	September 5, 1985 (#85001953)	10 and 12 S. Lake St. & 11-27 N. Lake St. 43°05′07″N 77°56′33″W	Bergen	Small group of late 19th-early 20th century downtown buildings, many with cast iron storefronts
13	Le Roy Historic District	Le Roy Historic District	January 31, 2017 (#100000612)	7-9 Clay, 8-8 1/2 Lake, 1-73, 2-72 Main, 7 Mill, 8-62, 3-61 W. Main Sts. 42°58′40″N 77°59′32″W	Le Roy	Core of historic village that grew up around Jell-O plant and Oatka Creek
14	Le Roy House and Union Free School	Le Roy House and Union Free School	November 7, 1997 (#97001388)	23 E. Main St. 42°58′42″N 77°59′11″W	Le Roy	Land office expanded into ornate Greek Revival House, now local historical museum, in three stages by Jacob Le Roy starting in 1823. 1898 school building in rear was first built by present Le Roy school district; now used as Jell-O museum.
15	LeRoy Methodist Episcopal Church		May 11, 2026 (#100012992)	10 Trigon Park; 42°58′39″N 77°59′09″W	Le Roy	
16	Machpelah Cemetery	Machpelah Cemetery	November 19, 2007 (#07001204)	North St. 42°59′10″N 77°59′01″W	Le Roy	Rural cemetery opened in 1858 and gradually expanded since then. Grave markers reflect many different trends in funerary art to present. Jell-O tycoon Orator Francis Woodward buried in prominent Classical Revival mausoleum.
17	Marion Steam Shovel	Marion Steam Shovel	February 22, 2008 (#08000038)	Gulf Rd. 42°59′33″N 77°56′17″W	LeRoy	Only remaining Marion Model 91 steamshovel; possibly largest extant steamshovel in world. May have been used in excavation of Panama Canal
18	Morganville Pottery Factory Site	Morganville Pottery Factory Site	February 15, 1974 (#74001240)	Address Restricted	Morganville	Site of factory in existence for much of 19th century making drain and ceramic tiles. Excavated by Rochester Museum and Science Center in 1973; may yet yield more artifacts.
19	Mount Pleasant	Mount Pleasant	August 9, 1984 (#84002393)	2032 Indian Falls Rd. 43°00′45″N 78°20′35″W	Indian Falls	Sophisticated 1861 Italianate farmhouse
20	Newberry Building	Newberry Building	September 11, 2017 (#100001585)	109–111 Main St. 42°59′50″N 78°10′58″W	Batavia	1881 Italianate commercial block updated twice in early 20th century
21	North Bergen Presbyterian Church	North Bergen Presbyterian Church	August 5, 2022 (#100007959)	7068 North Bergen Rd. 43°07′24″N 78°00′55″W	Bergen vicinity	
22	Oakfield High School		August 9, 2024 (#100010613)	1 North Pearl Street; 43°03′56″N 78°16′11″W	Oakfield	
23	Richmond Memorial Library	Richmond Memorial Library	July 24, 1974 (#74001239)	19 Ross St. 42°59′52″N 78°10′38″W	Batavia	1887 Richardsonian Romanesque library emulating several of Richardson's libraries in the Boston suburbs
24	Saint James Episcopal Church	Saint James Episcopal Church	September 24, 2004 (#04001062)	405 E. Main St. 42°59′59″N 78°10′32″W	Batavia	1908 Neo-Gothic church was first of many in Western New York designed by Robert North
25	St. Mark's Episcopal Church & Cemetery		July 29, 2021 (#100006761)	1 East Main St. 42°58′40″N 77°59′16″W	LeRoy	
26	Stafford Village Four Corners Historic District	Stafford Village Four Corners Historic District	October 8, 1976 (#76001220)	Junction of NY 5 and NY 237; 42°58′54″N 78°04′25″W	Stafford	19th-century buildings from first permanent settlement on Holland Purchase, continuously in existence since 1798. Includes one of oldest houses in county and eclectic former town hall.
27	Augustus S. Tyron House		March 13, 2013 (#13000074)	15 Church St. 42°58′47″N 77°59′17″W	Le Roy	
28	US Post Office-Le Roy	US Post Office-Le Roy	May 11, 1989 (#88002342)	2 Main St. 42°58′39″N 77°59′22″W	Le Roy	Local benefactor paid for stone to face late 1930s building with unique design among state post offices

== See also ==
- National Register of Historic Places listings in New York
