= Hysterical (podcast) =

Podcast hosted by Dan Taberski

Hysterical is a podcast hosted by Dan Taberski and produced by Wondery and Pineapple Street Media. The podcast is composed of seven episodes. The podcast discusses a mysterious ailment that affected multiple students in Le Roy, New York in 2011.

== Synopsis ==
Over a dozen girls experienced symptoms similar to Tourette syndrome without any clear causes. The show discusses the 1970 Lehigh Valley Railroad derailment as a potential cause. The town also has a large former Jell-o factory that has polluted a nearby river. The show explores the misogynistic history of hysteria. Throughout the show Taberski interviews most of the people involved with the incident.

== Reception ==
James Marriott wrote in The Times that "There is much to enjoy here but, as with so many shows nowadays, there is way too much padding."

== Awards ==
Award	Date	Category	Result	Ref.
Apple Podcasts Award	2024	Show of the Year	Won	
Signal Awards	2024	Limited Series Documentary	Gold	
Ambies	2025	Podcast of the Year	Won	
Ambies	2025	Best Reporting	Won	
Ambies	2025	Best Society and Culture Podcast	Nominated	
iHeartRadio Podcast Awards	2025	Podcast of the Year	Nominated	
iHeartRadio Podcast Awards	2025	Best Overall Host	Nominated	
iHeartRadio Podcast Awards	2025	Best Emerging	Nominated	
Pulitzer Prize	2025	Audio Reporting	Nominated	
Webby Awards	2025	Podcasts: Documentary (Limited-Series & Specials)	Won	
Webby Awards	2025	Podcasts: Best Writing 2025	Won	
