= Machpelah Cemetery (Le Roy, New York) =

Historic burial ground in Genesee County, New York

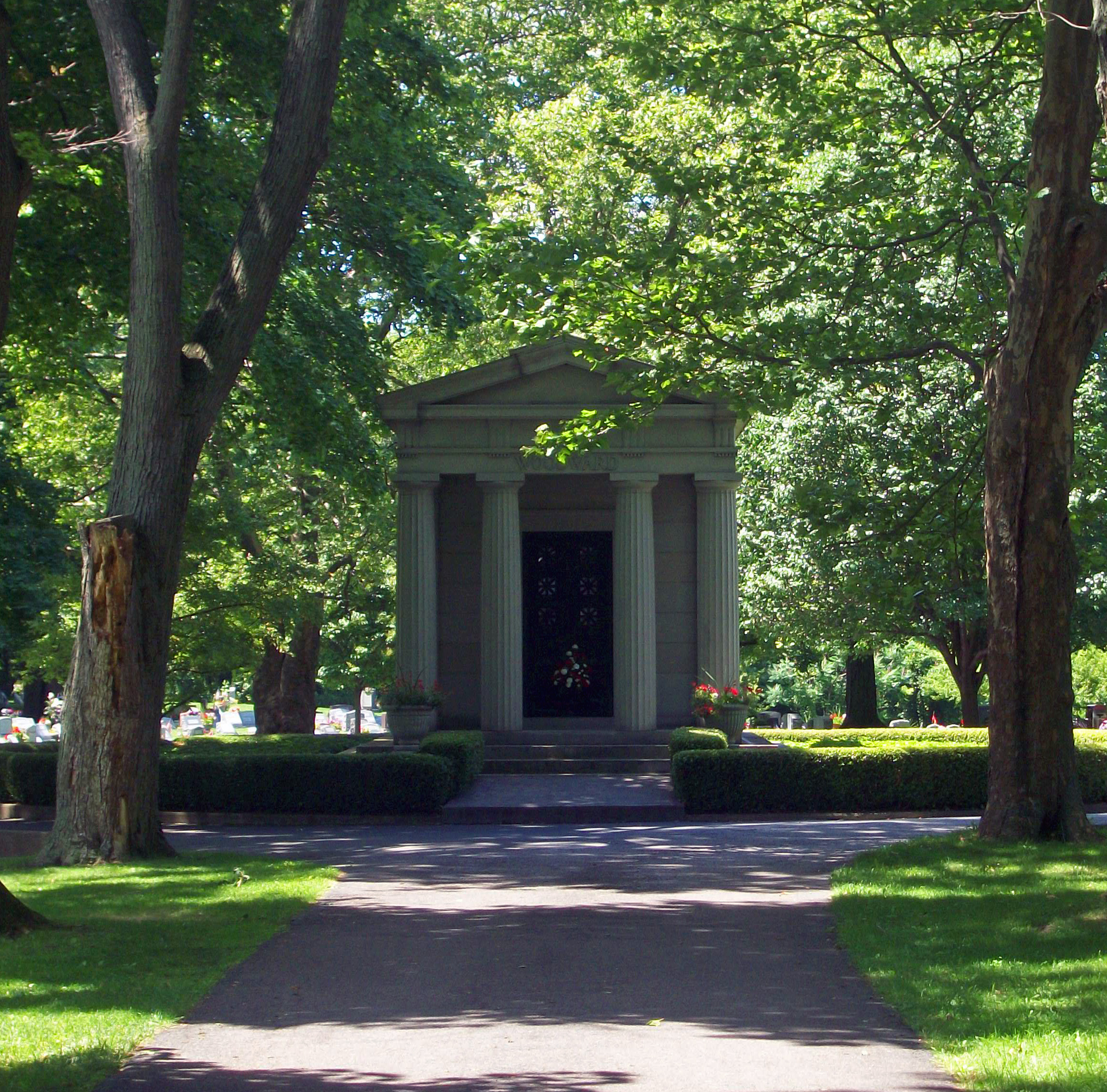
- Woodward Mausoleum, east elevation, 2010
- Interactive map of Machpelah Cemetery

Details
- Established: 1858
- Location: Le Roy, NY
- Country: USA
- Coordinates: 42°59′11″N 77°58′59″W
- Type: Private
- Owned by: Machpelah Cemetery Association
- Size: 24.7 acres (10.0 ha)
- No. of graves: 5,500
- Find a Grave: Machpelah Cemetery

Machpelah Cemetery is located on North Street in Le Roy, New York, United States. It was opened in the mid-19th century and expanded since then. Graves from other, smaller burial grounds around Le Roy have been added. It was listed on the National Register of Historic Places in 2007, one of two cemeteries in Genesee County with that distinction.

It was originally built and laid out as a rural cemetery, with a parklike setting on the banks of Oatka Creek. In the early 20th century its design philosophy changed, when a large mausoleum to local businessman Orator Francis Woodward, who in his last years made a fortune developing Jell-O into a bestselling dessert, was built in the southern section of the cemetery near his factory. The architect hired by the family to lay out the section was influenced by the City Beautiful movement, giving that area a more orderly cast.

Woodward's monument, visible from the cemetery's main entrance, is the most prominent of many notable graves in the cemetery. Other structures within include a memorial chapel built around the same time and a granite vault held together by its own weight. The markers exhibit a variety of materials, forms and styles of funerary art. Among the 5,500 dead buried here besides Woodward and his family are many people important to the history of Le Roy, including the daughters of its namesake, the inventor of Jell-O and Sarah Frances Whiting, an astronomer who was also one of the first to experiment with X-rays. Veterans of every American war lie at Machpelah as well.

== Buildings and grounds ==
The cemetery is located on a 24.7-acre (10.0 ha) parcel near the northern boundary of the village of Le Roy. Its western boundary is the irregular, curving Oatka Creek. On the south is the large, empty factory that once manufactured Jell-O when it was all produced in Le Roy. To the east, across North Street, are houses, and residential property continues to the north, into the Town of Le Roy.

A wrought iron fence runs along the south and east sides. At the three main entrances, and the southeast and northeast corners, are two limestone pillars topped with stone orbs. The southern third of the cemetery is generally flat, with axial roads radiating outward from the Woodward mausoleum near the southeast entrance. In the northern and central portions, the landscape becomes hillier, with a gentle descent to the creek. The roads there curve with the landscape. Throughout, the cemetery is planted with mature trees and shrubs from a variety of species.

There are three buildings on the cemetery grounds. The most prominent is the mausoleum of Orator Francis Woodward, the Le Roy resident who built a personal fortune from buying the patent for Jell-O. It is a small stone Classical Revival structure in the middle of a circle with large planted myrtles at the end of the short drive from the main entrance, serving as its focal point. The east (front) elevation has four Doric columns in front of bronze doors, and a similar colonnade on the west (rear) with a stained glass window. Its interior is paneled in marble. Interred there are Woodward, his wife Cora and their six children.

To the south of the main drive is the smaller Lampson mausoleum. It is built of panels of New Hampshire granite locked together by their own weight. Scottish variegated granite columns are on the north (front) elevation. Between them are marble doors opening into a chamber with a marble mosaic floor.

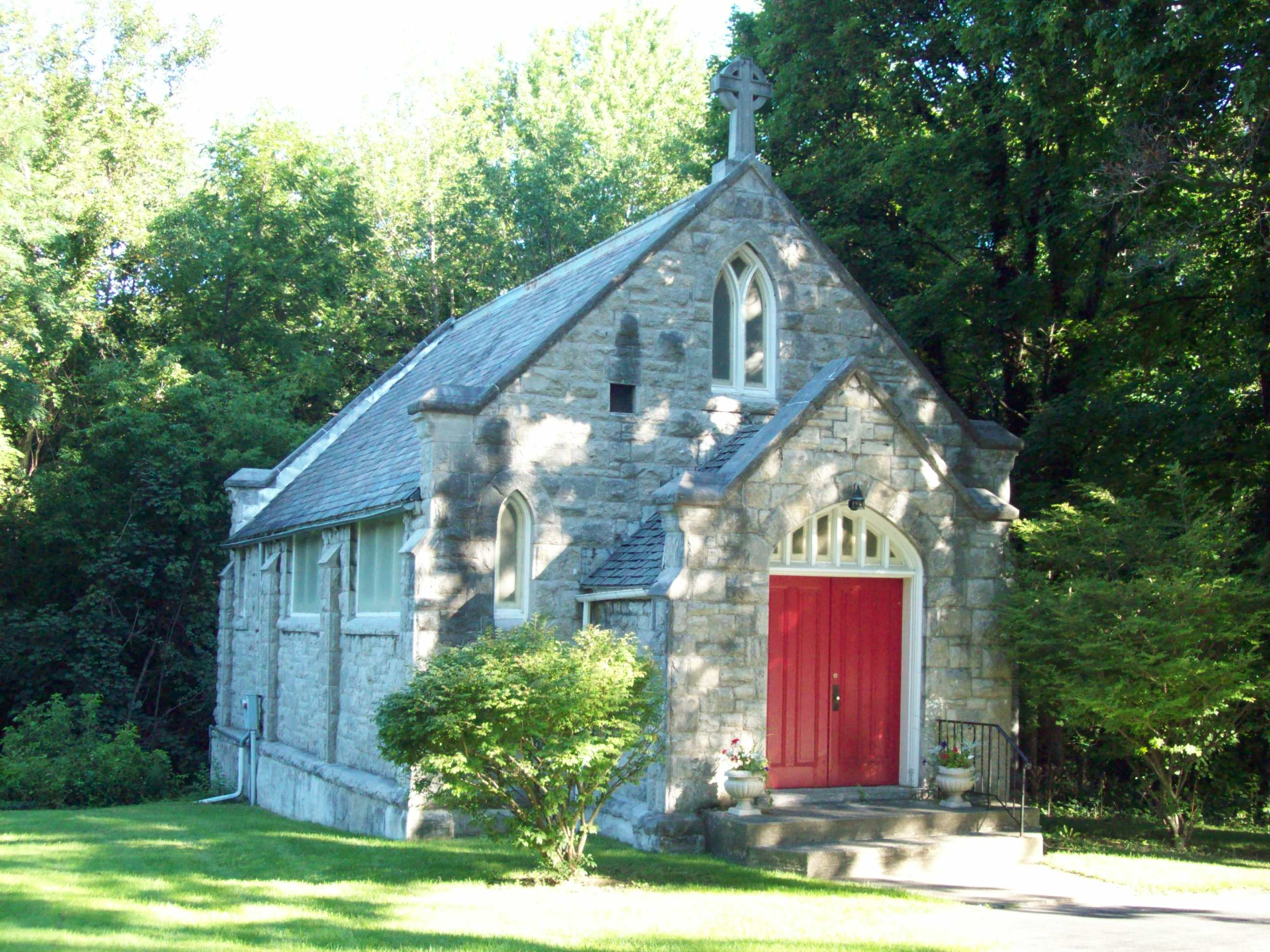
The Lathrop Chapel

Downhill from the drive at the northern entrance, the former main entrance, is the Lathrop Chapel, at the end of a parkway with plantings and a veterans' memorial. It is a vernacular Gothic limestone building with a slate roof. On its front is a portico with two lancet windows framing the entrance. Above is a double pointed-arch window with a Celtic cross at the roof.

All three are contributing resources to the cemetery's historic character. There is one other building, a modern cemetery office and garage just south of the main entrance. Due to its recent construction it is non-contributing.

There are 5,500 decedents buried at 6,500 graves in the cemetery's ten sections. They date from the time of the cemetery's founding to the present, and include a variety of funerary art from the times they were erected. They take a variety of forms, from traditional gravestones to obelisks, and use a variety of stones from granite and marble to green serpentine.

Among the notable markers are another one to the Woodwards. It is a large semicircle of pink Canadian granite, 20 feet (6.1 m) long and 10½ feet (3.2 m) deep with a paved terrace. On either side are curved benches with a small flower garden in the center around a rectangular stone.

Many members of the Olmsted family, prominent from Le Roy's early days, also have distinctive markers. The obelisk of John Randolph Olmsted is the tallest monument in the cemetery, and Chauncey Olmsted and his family also are memorialized with a large red granite obelisk atop a hill. John Barlow Olmsted's green serpentine stone, amid a grove of cedars, has a history of the family.

Some markers have distinctive decoration. Artist Frank Eastman Jones' stone has a carved palette. On the south knoll of the cemetery's west side are the graves of the three Bang children, outlined with low marble stones that resemble cribs when seen at a distance. A fourth Bang child has a nearby grave with a detailed carved cross decorated with ivy and flowers. Another descendant of a prominent local family, Sheldon Francis Bartow, has a large marble urn embellished with garlands on his stone. The white marble angel praying at the Paul family plot is the largest statue in the cemetery. Other distinct funerary art include the Greek letters Alpha and Omega (A and Ω) on the three Whiting graves and the Avilan crosses on the graves of Polly and Esther Barrows.

== History ==
The cemetery went through two phases of development. From its establishment to the end of the 19th century, it remained true to its conception as a rural cemetery. After the construction of the Woodward Mausoleum in the early years of the 20th, subsequent development was influenced by the contemporary City Beautiful movement.

=== 1801–1858: Conception and construction ===
Le Roy's first burying ground had been established in 1801, within three years of its settlement. Gradually seven other small graveyards came into being around the community's churches as it grew due to settlement of the Holland Purchase lands in the surrounding area and its location at the junction of Oatka Creek and a major road (now New York State Route 5) through the area. All were small, meant mainly for the churches' congregants.

The first rural cemetery, Mount Auburn Cemetery in Massachusetts, was established in 1831. The idea of burying the dead in a large, parklike tract with walking paths and plantings took some time to gain acceptance. Seven years later, in 1838, Rochester's Mount Hope Cemetery became the first rural cemetery in Western New York, and the first one to be operated by a municipality.

George Blodgett, a veteran of the War of 1812 and local businessman, may have been similarly inspired by the idea. He proposed that an eight-acre (3.2 ha) tract near the northwest corner of the village be acquired for a rural cemetery. At first he tried to finance the purchase through the sale of plots for $25 ($1,000 in contemporary dollars), but grew discouraged after he had only sold 20 in several years.

=== 1858–1906: Rural cemetery period ===
Blodgett turned to another prominent Le Roy citizen, Chauncey Olmsted, who would later be buried in the cemetery. Olmsted gave him $200, which made it possible to purchase the land from a local wheat farmer. Under Blodgett's supervision, Olmsted built the original fences and walkways. The Rev. Samuel Cox, first chancellor of Ingham University, suggested the name Machpelah, from Jacob's exhortation at Genesis 49:30: "Bury me with my fathers in the cave in the field of Ephrom the Hittite, the cave in the field of Machpelah ..."

The first decedent, twelve-year-old Caro Frances Chamberlin, was buried on the last day of 1858. Her grave is extant, atop the southern knoll in section B, Lot 16. Blodgett built the public vault into the hill near what is now the parkway leading to the Lathrop Chapel. Its limestone facade was copied soon after for a nearby family vault.

In 1870 the heirs of Miles Lampson, one of the wealthiest men in the village, built the granite mausoleum to him. Originally it was surrounded by a decorative iron fence. It was built by a Connecticut company for a reported cost of $10,000 ($255,000 in contemporary dollars). Later in that decade the cemetery grew when one of Le Roy's original burying grounds were closed down and the bodies moved. After the original Episcopal church was demolished, the bodies in its graveyard were divided between two other cemeteries. Among those moved to Machpelah were Julia and Caroline Le Roy, daughters of the community's namesake, Jacob Le Roy.

Ownership of the cemetery was formally transferred in 1873 from Blodgett to the Machpelah Cemetery Association. The following year Blodgett died, and the cemetery was formally consecrated. At the ceremony one speaker, Lucius Bangs, praised the cemetery's rural setting and its soothing effect:

A great peace settles into heart and brain as I look upon this home of our kindred—my home ... I remember that the feet of those who shall bear me to my possession will not hesitate and linger for the loneliness of my surrounding. In this sweet spot, by day and night, while the sun shines and the stars look down, while the rains fall and the dews brighten and the winds blow, nature tenderly and lovingly takes to her breast and keep[s] that which is her own—and I am satisfied.

Similar praise found its way into print in subsequent years. "The grounds are upon an elevation and are beautifully laid out with an excellent taste displayed in adapting new ideas to the laying out and beautifying of burial plots, which is worthy of imitation." wrote the Genesee County Gazetteer in 1890. Two decades later, in 1913, the Le Roy Gazette said:

Go where you may and it will be difficult to find a more picturesque spot or one better adapted for a cemetery than that of Machpelah. It seems as if nature had this in mind when this plot of ground was formed ... so beautiful a spot for the resting place of the dead. Reposing on the east bank of the Oatka, upon slight elevations, it has perfect drainage and with its beautiful trees it presents a handsome picture. At the foot of the slope, flows the Oatka river, through green and velvet-like meadows, and as it approaches the quiet retreat, it flows more softly, in its course, until well to the north when it becomes a rapid stream again.

With the new century the cemetery acquired a fence. The initial 1,367 feet (417 m) was installed along the east side by a Detroit company for $36.60 ($1,000 in contemporary dollars) in 1903. Later that decade, the cemetery association bought the property to the south and, in 1907, the Woodward Mausoleum was built. Afterwards, the southern boundary was fenced off and by late 1908 the limestone pillars at the gates and corners were in place.

=== 1906–present: City Beautiful ===
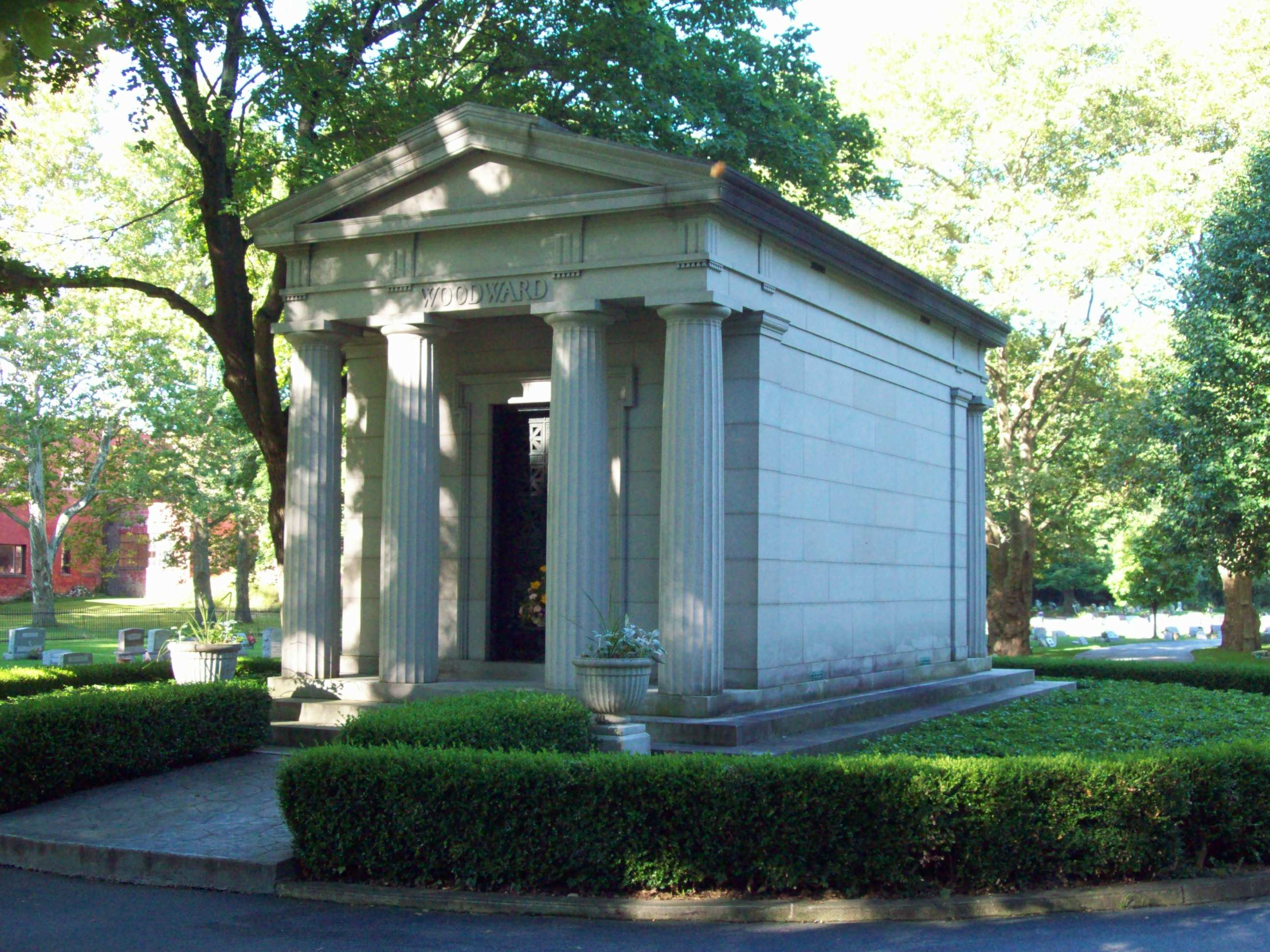
Another view of Woodward Mausoleum

Orator Francis Woodward's burial in the cemetery marked a change in design philosophies. He had made his Jell-O fortune in the last years of his life; his family put it to many philanthropic uses not only in Le Roy but in the greater Rochester area as well. His mausoleum was one of the first in the southern section, and the Woodward family retained landscape architect Alling Deforest, who had designed the gardens around the George Eastman House in Rochester, to design the surrounding landscape.

The roads radiating from the circular drive around the mausoleum impart clean, clear visual lines and symmetry to the landscape, in contrast to the meandering, idiosyncratic rural atmosphere of the older sections. This reflects the ideals of the contemporary City Beautiful movement, with a preference for symmetry and order in public spaces, particularly since this section directly abuts the factory where Woodward had made his fortune. It is augmented by the Classical Revival style of the mausoleum at the center of the Deforest-designed portion, the architect of which is not known. Deforest was also able to make a smooth transition between the newer and older sections and their different styles.

In 1910 the Union Free School in the village needed to expand and acquired the former Ingham University campus. Members of the Ingham family who had been buried there were moved to a small plot in Machpelah, along with the white marble obelisk memorializing Emily Ingham's husband Col. Phineas Staunton, who died on an expedition to South America and is buried in Ecuador. Also that year, the Lathrop Chapel, designed by Robert Fayfield of Buffalo, was erected. It is built into the hillside to allow its basement to be used as a vault.

There have been no significant additions to the cemetery since then. The chapel underwent several renovations at mid-century. In 1950 Helen Woodward Rivas, Orator's youngest daughter, paid for the first. Three years later, the Rev. Raymond Calkins funded additional work in memory of his wife's family, the Lathrops, giving the chapel its name. Among those renovations were a stained glass rose window; however it was replaced with the current window, depicting the Resurrection of Jesus as described at Matthew 28:1-6, six years later when Calkins objected to the rose window.

== Notable burials ==
A number of locally prominent people, some who also achieved national renown, are buried in Machpelah:

- Dick Gamble Canadian professional ice hockey player.
- Frank Eastman Jones, an artist whose grave marker has a carved palette.
- Janet DeMallie Boehme, She was the face of Eastman Kodak for decades, her husband Robert A "Bob" Boehme is next to her.
- Calvin Keeney, a village resident who invented the stringless bean.
- William Lampson, a local bank president who was the wealthiest man in the village when he died in 1897. His funeral vault is the only extant building of many he had constructed.
- Joshua Lathrop, Le Roy's first mayor (the position was called village president at the time).
- Jacob Le Roy's daughters Caroline and Julia, both of whom died in childhood, are the only members of the family buried in the village which bears their father's name. Their graves were among those moved into Machpelah later on.
- Pearle Bixby Wait, the actual inventor of Jell-O.
- Sarah Frances Whiting, an Ingham alumna who became an astronomer and was one of the first to experiment with X-rays.
- Donald Woodward, Orator's youngest son. He was an aviation pioneer who built the local airport and owned the Friendship, the plane Amelia Earhart flew across the Atlantic.
- Ernest Woodward, Orator's oldest son. He sold Jell-O to Postum for $66 million, the beginning of General Foods. With the money he supported local institutions, and even paid for some of the cost of the local post office.
- Orator Francis Woodward, The owner of the Genesee Pure Food Company. He bought the Jell-O patent from Wait in 1899 and died a millionaire seven years later.
- Nancy Van Doren, One of the founders of Washington State University, 1891.

Almost 400 war veterans are buried at Machpelah. They represent all wars, starting with three from Revolutionary War moved to Machpelah later in the 19th century. In 2006 the Le Roy Historical Society began putting flags on their graves, a practice the local American Legion post had discontinued in the 1980s due to lack of funds. It is part of a society project to update the records of the veterans buried at the cemetery.

== See also ==
- List of cemeteries in New York
- National Register of Historic Places listings in Genesee County, New York
