= 2011 Le Roy, New York illness outbreak =

Between October 2011 and June 2012, twenty people in Le Roy, New York, primarily teenage girls, reported perplexing medical symptoms including verbal outbursts, tics, seizure activity and speech difficulty. The affected individuals included 19 students (18 girls and one boy) from the LeRoy Junior-Senior High School and one 37-year-old woman.

Medical professionals ascribed the symptoms of many of those affected to conversion disorder. The event has been described as a case of mass psychogenic illness, and the first such case in which reports of affected individuals spread via social networks.

== Progression of events ==
The first case of an individual displaying unusual symptoms was recorded in 2011. On October 21, 2011, the Genesee County Health Department informed the New York State Department of Health (NYSDOH) that eight students at the LeRoy Junior-Senior High School had "recently developed neurologic tic symptoms". By mid-December, 12 girls at the LeRoy Junior-Senior High School had reported symptoms.

By late January 2012, eight of the 12 students had been diagnosed with conversion disorder by the Dent Neurologic Institute; three of the students had previous diagnoses of tic-related disorders, one of whom was previously diagnosed with Tourette syndrome.

Fifteen of the female students were treated by neurologist Laszlo Mechtler, of the Dent Neurologic Institute.

Investigations by the New York State Department of Health ruled out environmental causes to the symptoms, including the presence of mold, fungus, or chemicals in the school building, school grounds, or water supply. No environmental causes were found after repeated testing around the school and surrounding areas of town. Investigators also found no correlation in regards to vaccine (Gardasil) administration or shared activities, and found no evidence of drug use by students.

In mid-January 2012, five days after a community meeting in which the NYSDOH stated their diagnosis could not be revealed publicly due to HIPAA concerns, two of the girls appeared on NBC's Today Show to discuss their frustration with not getting adequate answers. The next day, Laszlo Mechtler, a neurologist treating most of the girls, was given permission to share the diagnosis of conversion disorder and mass psychogenic illness.

Unsatisfied with the investigation's results, some of the girls and their parents spoke out publicly against their diagnosis, stating they believed the situation warranted further scrutiny from outside sources. Alternative medical theories were suggested, including Tourette syndrome and PANDAS, which Mechtler and his team ruled out.

Beginning in late January, noted environmental activist Erin Brockovich was called to town to investigate environmental pollution from the 1970 Lehigh Valley Railroad derailment as a possible cause. During this time, many of the girls appeared in the local and national media, as well as posting on social media.

In February 2012, the Dent Neurologic Institute reported that two girls receiving treatment at the institute had recovered, with three others seeing improving symptoms.

Eventually, as doctors encouraged their patients to stay away from the media and the media attention died down, many of the girls' symptoms improved. Some girls, eight of whom had been diagnosed with PANDAS by other doctors and had received antibiotics, also saw their symptoms lessen or disappear. By the end of the school year in June, one girl was diagnosed with Tourette syndrome, and most of the girls who received treatment for conversion disorder were healthy in time for graduation.

== In media ==
The illness outbreak was cited as an inspiration of Megan Abbott's 2014 novel The Fever and Katherine Howe's 2014 novel Conversion.

The event was fictionalized in Lynn Rosen's 2017 play The Firebirds Take the Field.

The illness outbreak was the subject of Dan Taberski's 2024 podcast Hysterical.

The outbreak was featured in an episode of the true crime television series The Curious Case of.... Season 2 episode 7, titled "The Town with Tourette's" (2026)

== Academic analysis ==
A 2012 paper in the Journal of the Royal Society of Medicine questioned whether interaction on social media (Facebook, Twitter, YouTube and Internet blogs) contributed to mass psychogenic illness when the adolescent girls reported tic-like movements.

In late 2015, two academics from the University of Colorado, Donna Goldstein and Kira Hall, criticized authorities for their rapid diagnosis of conversion disorder, suggesting that even if such a diagnosis was correct, it should have been delayed while testing for any possible environmental cause had been completed.

In 2025, neurologist Jennifer McVige, Mechtler, and colleagues published an assessment of 15 students and an adult seen at the Dent Neurologic Institute. The assessment concluded that the cases constituted mass psychogenic illness.

=== Selected publications ===
- Cook, Ryan J. (2013). ""I Didn't Want to Be One of the Contaminated People": Confronting a Mystery Illness in a Rural American Landscape". Somatosphere: Science Medicine and Anthropology. 8.
- Goldstein, Donna M.; Hall, Kira (November 2015). "Mass hysteria in Le Roy, New York: How brain experts materialized truth and outscienced environmental inquiry" (PDF). American Ethnologist. 42 (4).
- Sammond, Nicholas (2015). "Touched by Le Roy: Teens, Tourette's, and YouTube in the Twilight of Neoliberalism". Women's Studies Quarterly. 43 (1/2): 29–50. ISSN 0732-1562.
- McVige, Jennifer; Rooney, Megan; Shukri, Said; Munir, Ahmad; Mechtler, Laszlo; Mangold, Sarah (2021-04-13). "Le Roy: Diagnosing Mass Psychogenic Illness (2400)". Neurology. 96 (15_supplement). doi:10.1212/WNL.96.15_supplement.2400. ISSN 0028-3878.
