= Le Roy, New York (disambiguation) =

Le Roy, New York is the name of two locations in Genesee County, New York:

- Le Roy (village), New York
- Le Roy (town), New York
