= Marion Steam Shovel (Le Roy, New York) =

- U.S. National Register of Historic Places
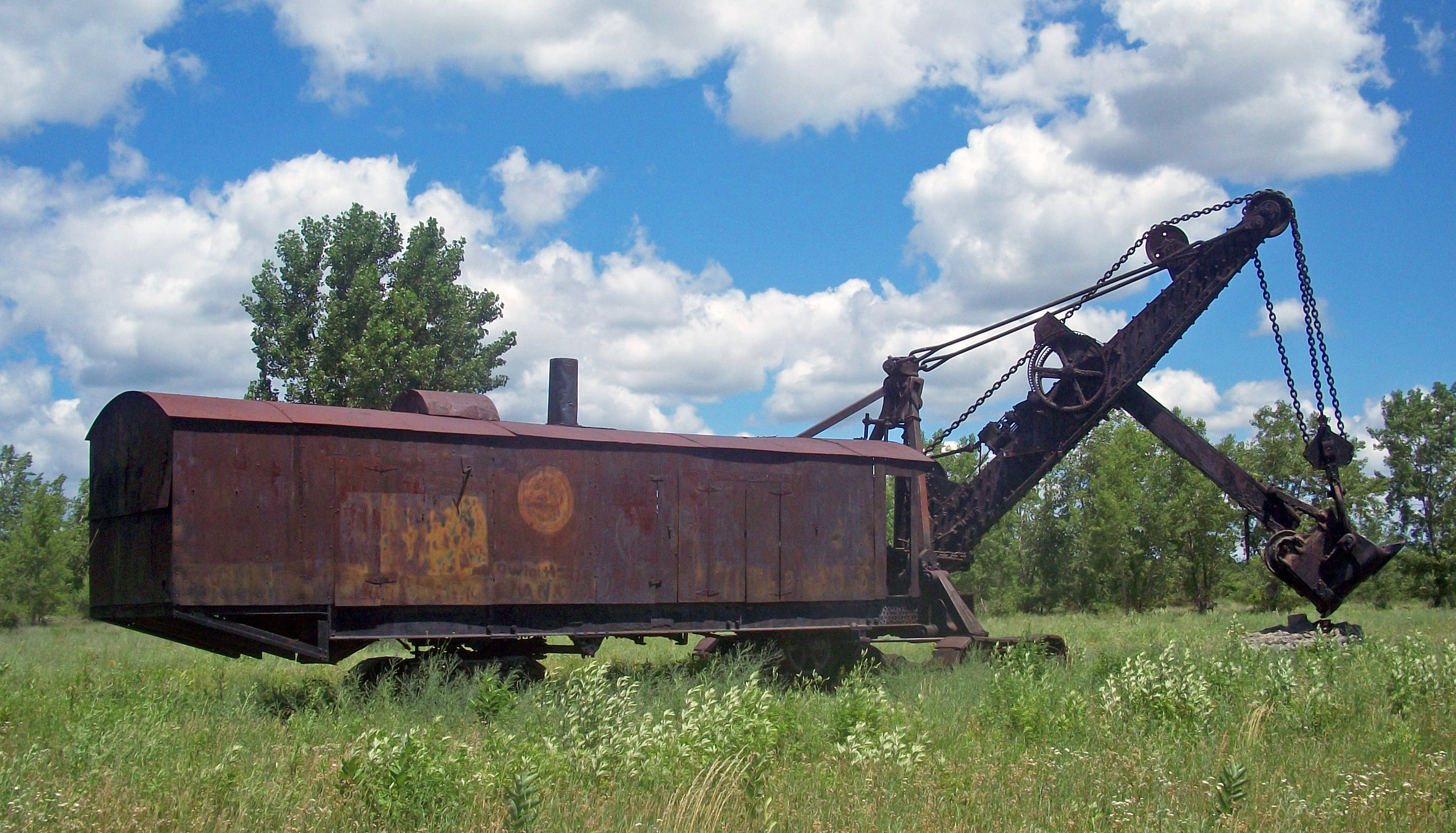
- South view of shovel in 2010

- Location within New York Location within the United States
- Location: Le Roy, NY
- Coordinates: 42°59′33″N 77°56′17″W
- Area: 0.1 acres (0.04 ha)
- Built: 1906
- Architect: Marion Steam Shovel Co.
- NRHP reference No.: 08000038
- Added to NRHP: February 22, 2008

The Marion Steam Shovel, also known as the Le Roy Steam Shovel, is a historic Model 91 steam shovel manufactured by the Marion Steam Shovel and Dredge Company of Marion, Ohio. It is located on Gulf Road in the Town of Le Roy, New York, United States.

Representative of the type of technology developed in the late 19th century and early 20th century to provide large, inexpensive supplies of crushed stone for the vast American railroad network and later for the road construction, it is believed to be the largest intact steam shovel remaining in the world. No longer operational, it was moved to its current site in the mid-20th century. It is currently owned by the town. In 2008 it became the first steam shovel listed on the National Register of Historic Places, the only listing in the Town of Le Roy and the easternmost in Genesee County. It is the last remaining example of the type which set world records for material removed while digging the Panama Canal.

== Description ==
The shovel is located on the north side of Gulf Road, two miles (3.2 km) east-northeast of the village of Le Roy, just opposite the driveway into the Hanson Company's limestone quarry. It is in a field behind a fence with locked gate. On the road there is space to pull vehicles over and look at it. The Register listing includes an area of about 0.1 acres (0.04 ha), delineated by a perimeter 10 feet (3.05 m) around the shovel.

While the original decorations have largely faded off the side, in several places on the shovel the Marion name is cast and legible. The model number plates have been removed, but the patent plate is still in place. The shovel weighs 105 short tons (94 long tons; 95 tonnes).

Its main section is the size of a railroad boxcar, 18 feet (5.49 m) wide by 42 feet (12.80 m) long, with an arched roof and siding of riveted sheet metal, now rusted. The operator's cab is on the east-facing front end, with most of the rest of the section housing the shovel's three steam engines and a 5-by-15-foot (1.52 by 4.57 m) boiler, no longer in working condition, with horizontal flues. A plate on its door bears the number 5304. An eight-foot (2.44 m) coal bin was added to the rear after it was built. The section rests on two pairs of caterpillar tracks, one pair out in front on a twenty-foot –wide (6.10 m) outrigger, the other in the middle.

The largest of the three engines is the hoisting engine. It is a double-cylinder horizontal type with a 12-inch (305 mm) bore and 16-inch (406 mm) stroke. In addition to powering the hoist, it provided locomotive power and could move the shovel at speeds of a one-quarter mile per hour (0.40 km/h). About 50 feet (15.24 m) of the hoist chain has been removed.

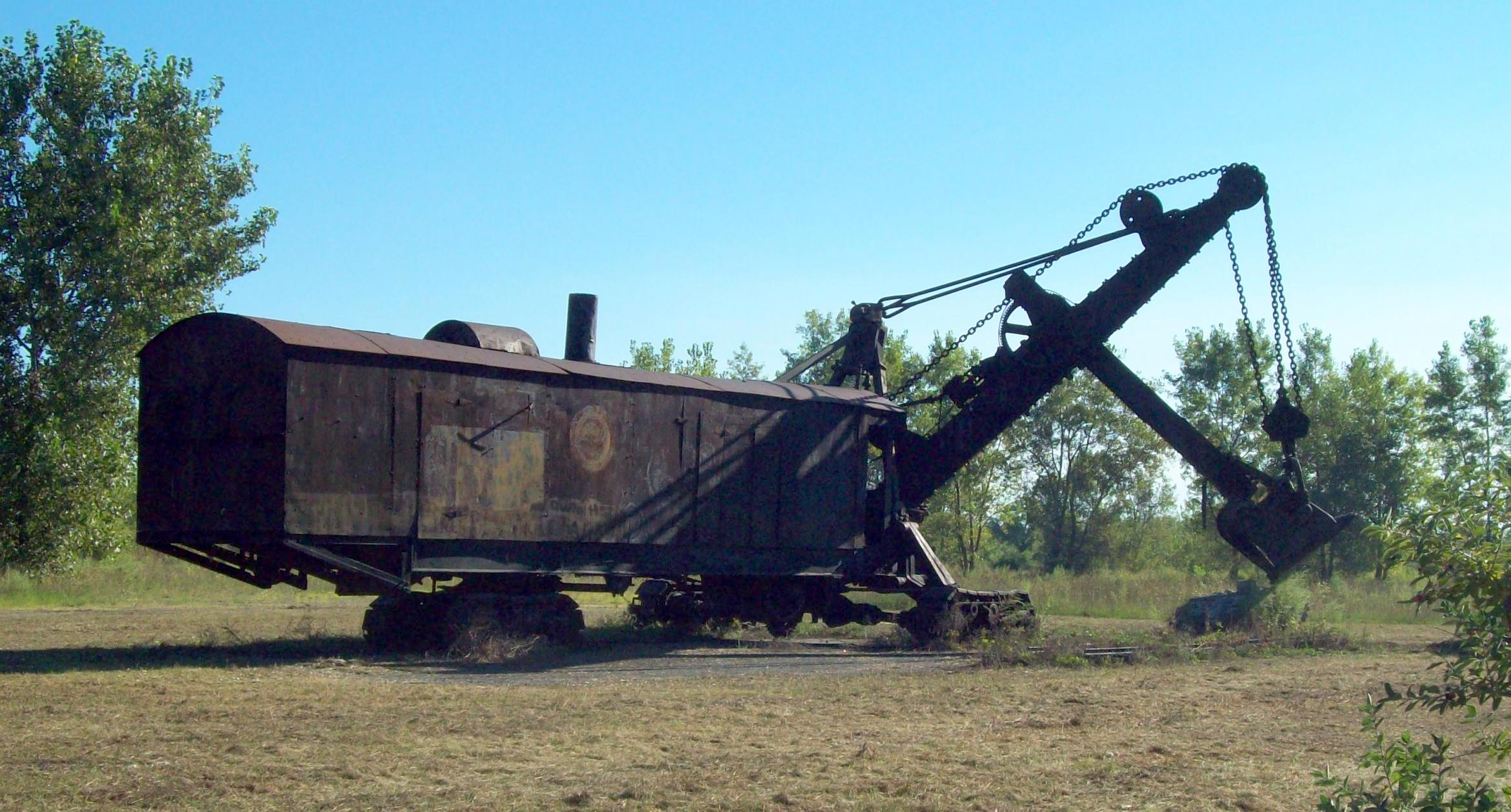
Shovel with treads visible

Both of the other engines have an 8-inch (203 mm) bore. The swing engine, attached to a chain around the swing circle, moves the boom from side to side. The other engine, the boom or crowd engine, raises and lowers the dipper. Due to its exposure to the weather, it is no longer in working condition. The other two, wholly inside the main section, were more protected from the elements and could be operated with compressed air.

On the east end is the outrigger. It consists of two joined arms connected by gears and chains to the appropriate engines. At the end is the bucket, with a capacity of 2 1/2 cubic yards (1.9 m^{3}). Beneath it is a small pile of rocks.

== History ==
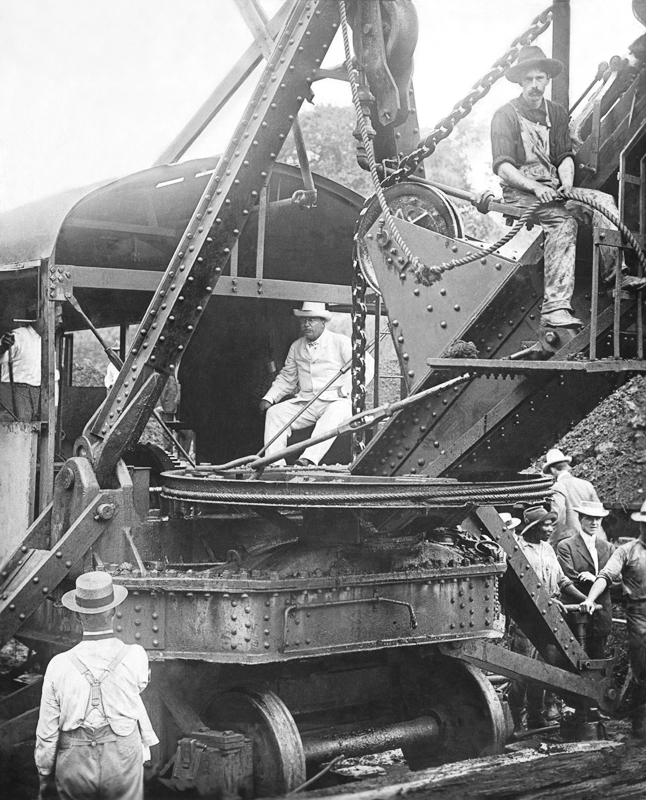
Theodore Roosevelt in the Panama canal in 1908 on a Bucyrus Steam Shovel

The Marion Power Shovel Company came into being in the 1880s as a collaboration between a frustrated shovel operator turned inventor and an industrialist. The former, Henry Barnhart, designed a new shovel that he hoped would break down less frequently than existing models. He went into business with financial backing from Edward Huber and patented the idea in 1883. The following year they partnered with another industrialist, George King, and started the company in Marion, Ohio. Over the next decades it grew into a major manufacturer of construction equipment.

Steam shovels were in particular demand due to the need for crushed stone as ballast in the nation's railroad network, a demand that expanded in the early 20th century as roads began to be graveled and paved for use by motor vehicles. Le Roy, near the Onondaga Escarpment, was a prime location for limestone quarrying, atop a 150-foot (45.72 m) layer of the stone. Since shortly after its settlement in the early 19th century, Le Roy had supported several such operations. Most of the limestone had been produced for architectural use, and a number of extant buildings in the Le Roy area, including the Lathrop Chapel at Machpelah Cemetery, are made of locally quarried limestone.

What eventually became the General Crushed Stone Company was founded in 1899 when the Duerr Contracting Company took over the Le Roy operations of a Tyrone, Pennsylvania, man who had been unable to meet the demands of the Lehigh Valley Railroad, a major customer. After two reorganizations, it became General Crushed Stone in 1902. Headquarters were in South Bethlehem, Pennsylvania.

The company's president, James Madison Porter, equipped the quarries it operated with new equipment, particularly what was at the time the world's largest rock crusher. It began to pioneer the new field of manufacturing aggregate, particularly a patented blend called Amiesite, for road surfaces. By 1906 it had contracts for 500,000 short tons (450,000 long tons; 450,000 tonnes) of stone annually, two-thirds of which were purchased by the railroad. The Le Roy quarry produced 2,000 short tons (1,800 long tons; 1,800 tonnes) a day, most of which was shipped to the rail yards at Sayre, Pennsylvania.

On March 14, 1906 the local newspaper at the time, the Le Roy Gazette, reported on the new equipment that began operation that day. In addition to the rock crusher, it mentioned a "100-ton steam shovel that was manufactured specifically for General Crushed Stone by the Barnard [sic] Steam Shovel Company of Marion, Ohio." It cannot be determined if the shovel described is the one currently on the site since a 1932 photograph of the quarry shows two such shovels in action. The Gazette describes the bucket as holding 5 cubic yards (3.8 m^{3}), twice the capacity of the extant shovel's bucket, but the shovel was modified considerably after purchase and it is possible a smaller replacement bucket could have been installed as part of those changes.

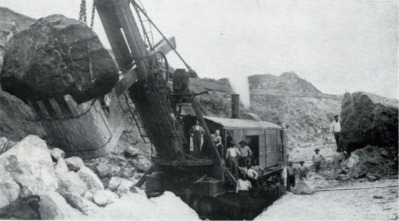
A Marion steam shovel at work on the Panama Canal

Company lore always claimed that the shovel was one of two purchased by General Crushed Stone in 1911 from the Isthmian Canal Commission, which had just finished building the Panama Canal; no documentation has yet been found to support this. It is possible since the shovel is one of 131 Model 91s that Marion manufactured during the first decade of the 20th century. Sixteen were purchased by the commission and used to dig the canal; one of them set what was then a world record in 1912 when it dug 5,554 cubic yards (4,246 m^{3}) of earth from a pit at the site of Gatun Dam. The model plates have been removed from the Le Roy shovel, but it has been conclusively identified as a Model 91 since its dimensions match those in Marion's archived corporate records for the line. No other 91s are known to survive.

The Model 91 required eight workers to operate. Four worked in the main section. The operator sat in the front booth and used levers to move the hoist and lift and lower the bucket. When it was time to move the shovel he took care of that as well. A cranesman, who sat on the left-hand side of the boom, controlled the crowd engine, which allowed him to set the depth of the cut and release the bucket's contents when it was full by tugging on a wire rope attached to it. In the rear was an engineer who tended the boiler and a fireman who shoveled the coal.

Outside the shovel a crew of four took up and laid the track along which its flanged wheels moved. They also set up the jackscrews necessary to stabilize the shovel in front of the rock face it was digging and dismantled them when it was time to move. This aspect of the excavation process proved to be time-consuming and labor-intensive, as well as dangerous, for such a large piece of machinery. In 1916 Marion began selling conversion kits to allow the shovel to be placed on caterpillar treads; seven years later the General Crushed Stone shovels were so modified.

The Model 91 continued in use at the Le Roy quarry through the 1930s, gradually being displaced by newer diesel-powered equipment. At some point before World War II its original wood siding was replaced with the current metal. It continued to be used during the war and managed to avoid the scrap metal drives. In 1949 it was taken out of service and moved to its present location.

In the early 1960s the Town of Le Roy acquired the land on which the steam shovel sits. The quarry across the road has remained in operation, now under the ownership of Dolomite (CRH Americas Materials) who donated the stone for the pull-off area to view the shovel.

Research continues on whether the shovel actually was used on the Panama Canal.

== See also ==
- National Register of Historic Places listings in Genesee County, New York

== Bibliography ==
- Pierpoint, Ruth L. (2008-02-28). "National Register of Historic Places Registration Form" (PDF). nps.gov. United States Department of the Interior - National Park Service. Archived from the original (PDF) on 2009-05-31.
