= Lake Street Historic District =

Lake Street Historic District may refer to:

- Lake Street Historic District (Bergen, New York), listed on the National Register of Historic Places in Genesee County
- Lake Street Historic District (Waupaca, Wisconsin), listed on the National Register of Historic Places in Waupaca County, Wisconsin
