= Morganville Pottery Factory Site =

- U.S. National Register of Historic Places
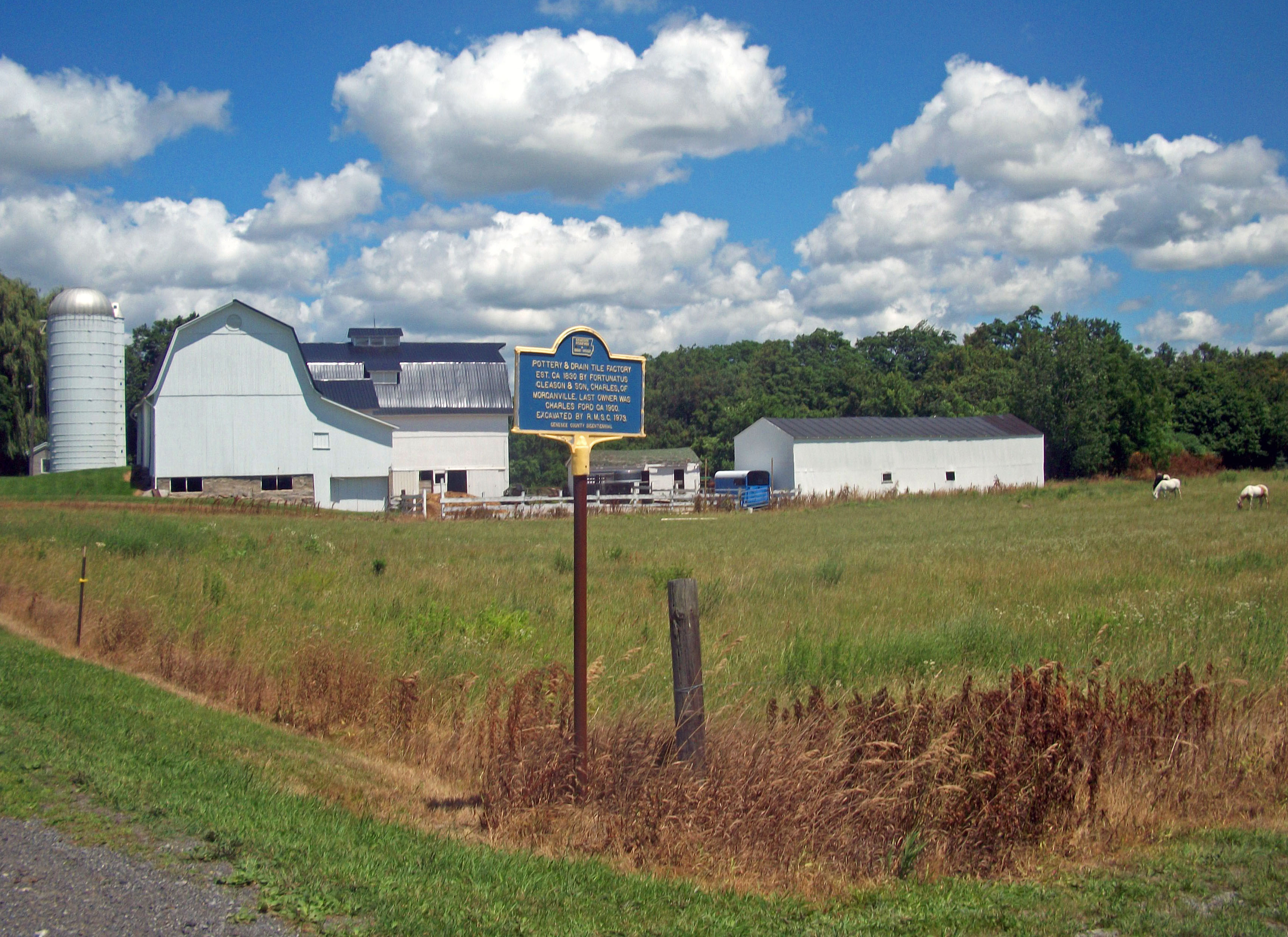
- Site and historical marker, 2010
- Nearest city: Morganville, NY
- Built: 1829
- NRHP reference No.: 74001240
- Added to NRHP: February 15, 1974

Morganville Pottery Factory Site is an archeological site located at Morganville in Genesee County, New York. It was the location of a factory that produced ceramics and tile from 1829 until the end of the 19th century.

An excavation in 1973 by a team from the Rochester Museum and Science Center yielded many artifacts. It was listed on the National Register of Historic Places in 1974.

== See also ==
- National Register of Historic Places listings in Genesee County, New York
