= United States Post Office (Le Roy, New York) =

- U.S. Post Office
- U.S. National Register of Historic Places
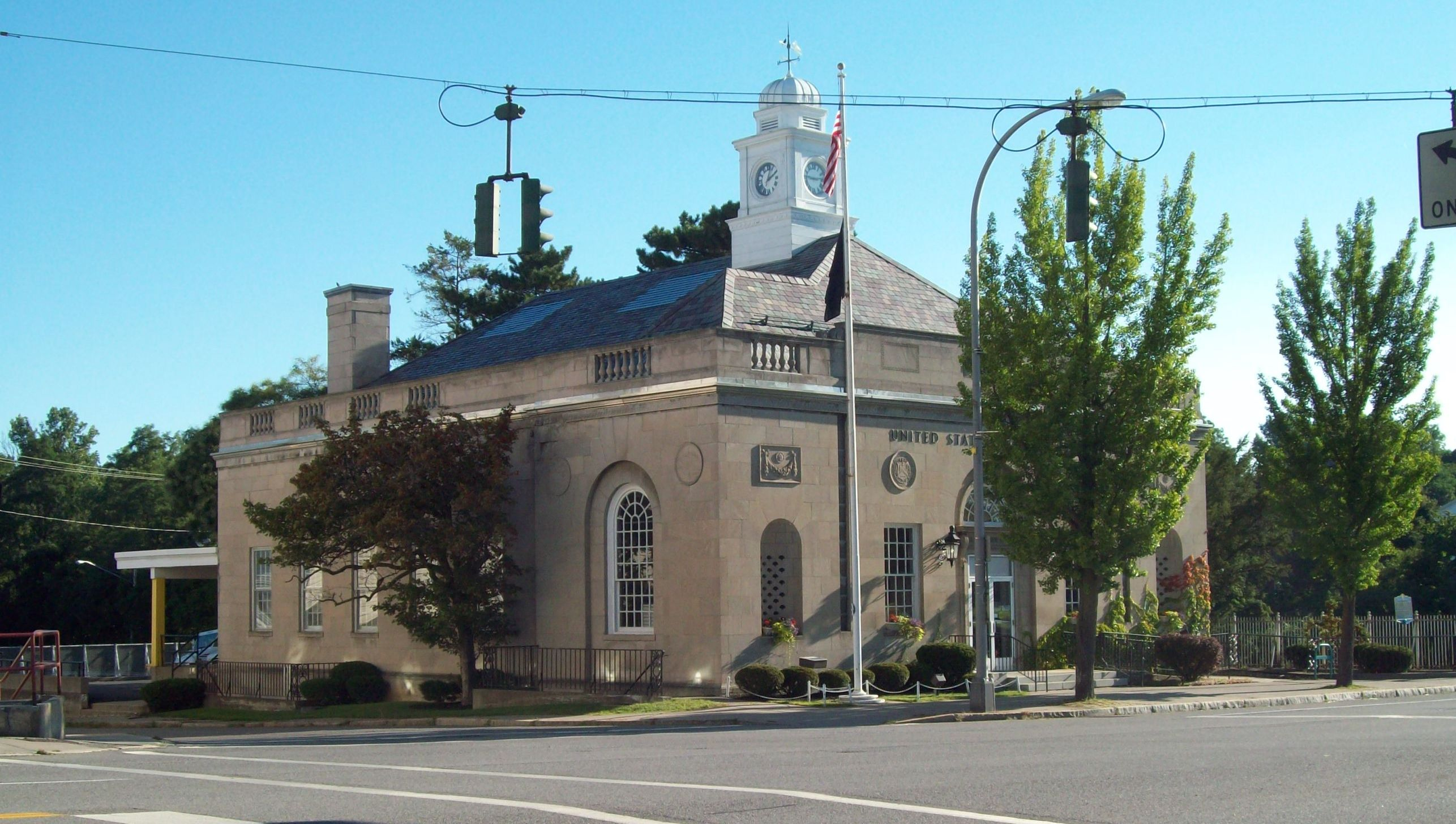
- West profile and south elevation, 2010

- Location within New York Location within the United States
- Interactive map showing the location for U.S. Post Office, Le Roy
- Location: Le Roy, New York
- Coordinates: 42°58′40″N 77°59′21″W
- Built: 1936–38
- Architect: James Arnold
- Architectural style: Colonial Revival
- MPS: US Post Offices in New York State, 1858-1943, TR
- NRHP reference No.: 88002342
- Added to NRHP: May 11, 1989

The U.S. Post Office in Le Roy, New York, serves the 14482 ZIP Code, covering the village and town of Le Roy. It is a brick and stone building on Main Street (New York State Route 5) erected in the late 1930s.

Its Colonial Revival design, featuring a hipped roof and limestone facing, is unique among post offices in the state as the only small one with a clock tower or limestone facing. This is a result of half of the construction being financed privately by a local benefactor. In 1989 it was listed on the National Register of Historic Places, the only one in Genesee County so recognized independently. (Note: The 1919 Batavia post office, though determined ineligible for inclusion on the Register, is still a contributing property to the Genesee County Courthouse Historic District per United States Post Offices in New York State 1858–1943, Thematic Resources, p. 59.)

== Building ==
The post office is located at the northeast corner of Main and Mill streets, at the eastern edge of downtown Le Roy, two blocks east of the Clay and Lake street (New York State Route 19). To its east a 25-foot (7.6 m) stone retaining wall separates it from Oatka Creek, next to a partial dam. South and west are other commercial properties; a parking lot is located to the north. The lot slopes significantly enough due to the proximity of the creek, exposing the basement on the north (rear) side.

The building itself is an almost square one-story steel frame structure, five bays on the south (front), east and north and six on the west. It is faced in coursed ashlar limestone and topped by a hipped roof shingled in slate, set off by a shallow cornice and parapet with balustraded sections above the windows, around the entire roofline. In the center is a square wooden cupola with a dome, illuminated electric clock and weather vane. A wide stone chimney rises from the rear.

In the center of the south façade is the recessed main entryway, flanked by metal lanterns. Above the doors are a large radiating fanlight and a small hood supported by stone consoles. It is flanked by 12-over-12 double-hung wooden sash windows. At the end bays are recessed niches with small semicircular openings at the top. Above all the windows are carved panels depicting, in alternation, garlands and postal motifs. Metal letters affixed above them, below the cornice, spell out "UNITED STATES POST OFFICE" with smaller letters saying "LE ROY NEW YORK" in the frieze above the doors.

At the south end of the side facades are double-recessed arched 20-over-15 sash windows on slightly projecting portions with carved medallions. Other windows on those facades are identical to the flanking windows on the front. A wooden canopy shelters the loading dock at the rear.

Walled stone steps lead to the modern double metal-and-glass double doors at the main entrance. They open into a wooden vestibule. Behind it is the L-shaped main lobby, occupying four of the front five bays and stretching around the southwest corner. The postmaster's office is in the southeast corner.

It retains many original finishes, from black and white checkerboard terrazzo flooring, black marble borders and baseboard and veined gray marble wainscoting to seven feet (2.1 m) along the walls. Above is a plaster wall and ceiling with molded cornice. The insides of the windows are also recessed and decorated with beaded molding. The screenline features unusual angled glass and metal grilles above the teller windows and lockboxes.

== History ==
Le Roy was established in the last years of the 18th century, before the Holland Purchase, covering the vast majority of the other land in Western New York, was initiated. The intersection of the creek and a major Iroquois trail through the region (today Route 5) made it an ideal place for a mill. By 1804 it had a post office, and 30 years later it was incorporated as a village.

Throughout the 19th and early 20th centuries, the post office was housed in a variety of rented or leased locations in the village. In 1929, Congress, lobbied by local resident Ernest L. Woodward, heir to the Jell-O fortune, authorized the construction of a dedicated facility in the village and appropriated funds for its construction as an amendment to the Public Buildings Act. It took longer to start and complete than other New Deal post offices in New York, partly due to Woodward's involvement.

Congress reiterated its authorization in another amendment two years later passed in response to the onset of the Great Depression, after Woodward donated land federal and state inspectors approved after flying over it.

Despite the lack of adequate frontage, it had other advantages that made it an ideal site. The Treasury Department, which oversaw postal construction, asked Woodward to obtain additional land along the creek from the Niagara Hudson Company, the local electric utility, for a retaining wall. He did, but the Treasury refused to accept the deed over concerns about liability the government might face from past flood damage. After many trips to Washington to lobby officials there, Woodward resolved the impasse by obtaining a surety bond absolving Niagara Hudson.

Woodward suggested that Rochester architect James Arnold, who was familiar with Le Roy's downtown, be commissioned to design the building. The recommendation was accepted, and Arnold promptly produced a building. It was reported to be "almost an exact copy" of the Radcliffe Library at Oxford University. Woodward, U.S. Representative Archie D. Sanders, the postmaster and village officials sent a petition to Treasury requesting that the stone used be native to the area.

Due to the change in presidential administrations and the beginning of the New Deal, a final appropriation was delayed. In November 1933 the budget was halved when president Franklin D. Roosevelt decided to focus on reforestation instead. Many village residents reconsidered whether a post office that reflected the community could be built with the limited funds available. Woodward rallied residents to lobby for the restoration of the full appropriation, and they secured it the next year. Most of the money allocated would go to building the retaining wall, after the village and the government resolved a dispute over which of them would pay for how much.

Construction was plagued by problems from the start. No local stonecutters were available, and Indiana limestone was therefore substituted for local stone. The low bidder on the job, a Kenmore contractor, went bankrupt before construction could begin in late 1935. The bonding company chose a Rochester firm to replace it, and the cornerstone was laid in August 1936, without any of the usual ceremonies. After learning that the contractor had bid on the assumption that they were to be building a brick structure, Woodward paid for the limestone facing himself.

He further intervened to delay the building's scheduled opening in the spring of 1937, dissatisfied with the roof. He felt the original flat roof, a feature of many post offices of the era, looked "squatty" and undistinguished. That summer plans for the current roof, with clock tower, were approved, and construction began again. The building was finally dedicated in 1938, almost two years to the day after construction began. It was estimated that the total cost of construction, including the monies donated by Woodward, was almost $90,000 ($2.06 million in contemporary dollars). As a result of his contribution, the Le Roy post office is the only small one in the state with a clock tower and limestone facing. Its hipped roof with parapet is also distinctive.

== See also ==
- National Register of Historic Places listings in Genesee County, New York
