= First Presbyterian Church (Batavia, New York) =

Historic church in New York, United States

Batavia First Presbyterian
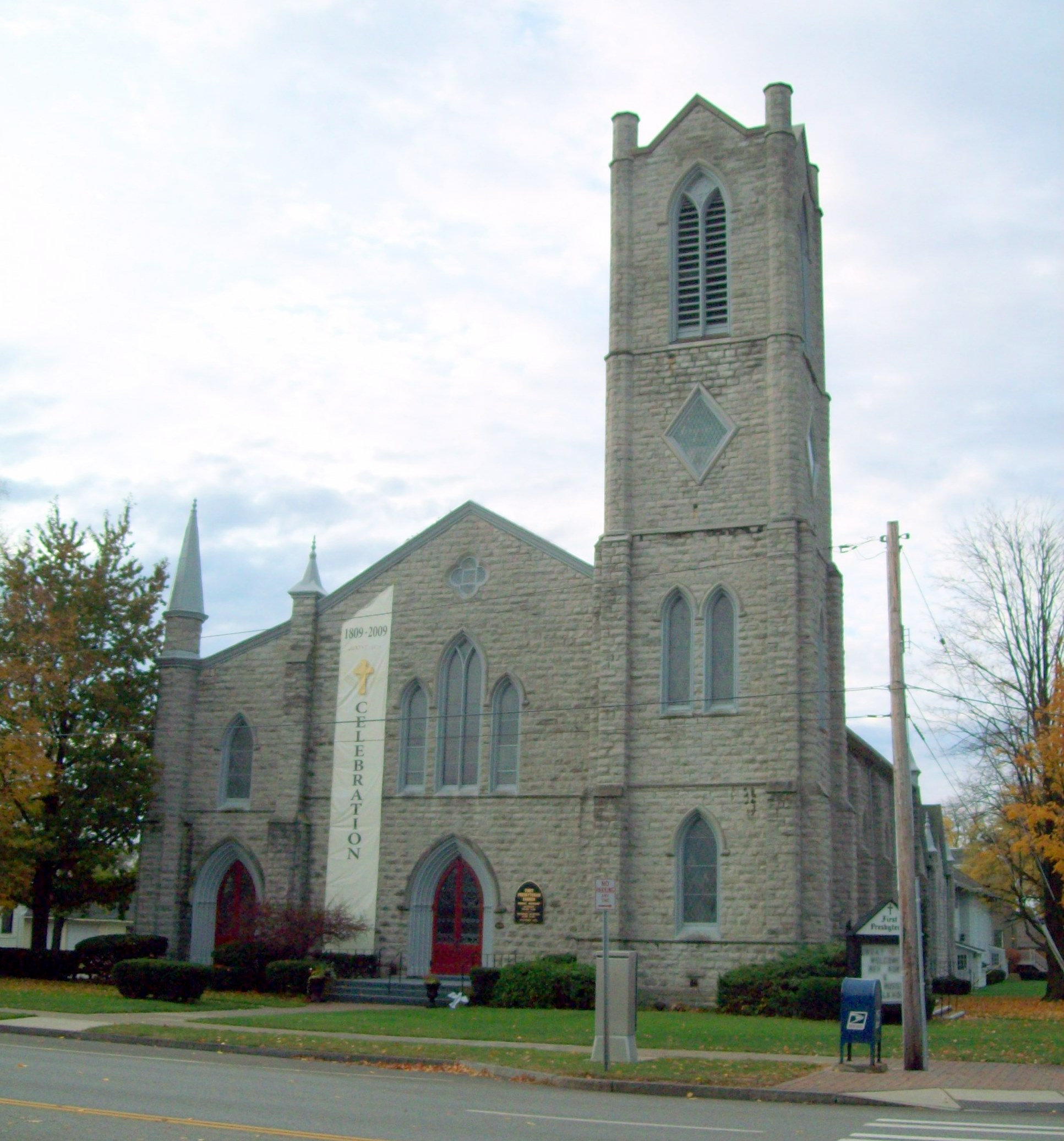
- North elevation and west profile of original church, 2009

Religion
- Affiliation: Presbyterian
- Leadership: Pastor Roula Alkhouri

Location
- Location: Batavia, NY, USA
- Interactive map of Batavia First Presbyterian
- Coordinates: 42°59′47″N 78°10′44″W

Architecture
- Style: Gothic Revival, Bungalow/Craftsman
- Groundbreaking: 1854
- Completed: 1855
- Construction cost: $35,000

Specifications
- Direction of façade: north
- Materials: stone

U.S. National Register of Historic Places
- Added to NRHP: December 6, 2004
- NRHP Reference no.: 04001339

Website
- First Presbyterian Church of Batavia, N.Y.

The First Presbyterian Church in Batavia, New York, United States, is located at East Main (New York state routes 5 and 33) and Liberty streets. It is a joined complex of several buildings. The main one, the church's sanctuary, is a limestone Gothic Revival structure built in the mid-19th century. Its congregation was the first church to be organized in Batavia, albeit as a Congregationalist group at that time.

Over the next century various improvements and expansions would be made, using later architectural styles, reflecting changing styles of American Protestant worship. This transition was completed with changes to the sanctuary in the mid-20th century. It was listed on the National Register of Historic Places in 2004.

== Buildings and grounds ==
The church occupies a 1.2-acre (4,900 m^{2}) parcel on the southeast corner of the intersection. A historic house separates the church property from another house of worship, First Baptist, to the east, with other old houses filling out the block to Swan Street. Another church, Resurrection Parish, is opposite, at the Summit Street Corner. West of the intersection are the commercial buildings of downtown Batavia. South of the church is another commercial building, with parking lots in the interior of the block to the southeast.

=== Exterior ===
The main church building consists of three separate sections, now joined. At the north, set back from East Main, is the original church, a three-by-five-bay structure faced in rock-cut limestone blocks with smooth-faced trim. A square bell tower pierces the wood-shingled low-pitched gabled roof. Just to the south, the lower Sunday school wing, also of limestone, has two cross-gables on its roof. A two-story hyphen connects it to the wood frame Memorial Service Building, a one-story structure topped by a high hipped roof with broad overhanging eaves.

On the north (front) facade, the original church has corner buttresses. The entrances are heavy wooden lancet arched doors with beveled leaded glass panels set in angled reveals. Colonettes at the outer edge gradually become convex moldings at the doors' edge. Above the main entrance is a tripartite lancet-arch Gothic window topped by a blind quatrefoil in the gable field. The side entrance is separated by a buttress, topped with a small square pinnacle above the roofline and complemented by a larger conical pinnacle rising from the corner buttress.

There are four stages to the bell tower, all set off by smooth-finished belt courses. Its corner buttresses continue to the top, gradually changing from square to circular as they do and becoming part of the crowning parapet along with a small pediment on each side. The stages are fenestrated, from top to bottom, with a single lancet arched window, double lancet-arched windows, a diamond panel and louvered Gothic window.

The church's side elevations have one lancet-arch window per bay separated by buttresses. The Sunday school wing has large single Gothic windows on the west elevation, facing Liberty Street, and paired windows on the first story topped by paired windows in Tudor-arched openings on the other faces. To its south, the Memorial Service Building has wide shingle siding and large tripartite windows.

=== Interior ===
The sanctuary has two sets of pews divided by a broad center aisle. A serpentine balcony supported by iron columns covers the northern third, with a glazed screen creating a narthex. At the south end, a pulpit and lectern front a dais with Communion table in front of a dossal curtain is set in a crenellated Tudor Gothic wooden surround between two sets of organ pipes. On either side are the choir risers. The stained glass windows are set in a geometric pattern, each one having a diagonal stripe suggesting heraldric origin, with a floral design in yellow or pink at the top.

A door in the southeast corner leads into the Sunday school wing. It features a two-story atrium, with the upper level accessible from stairs at a dais on the south end. It is finished primarily in plaster and dark-stained wood trim. Small classrooms are off to the sides on both levels. In the center of the ceiling is a large recessed circular light glazed with stained glass. The windows are done in marbleized glass in shades of amber or green in the classrooms and clear glass in the offices.

The hyphen has entrances on the east and west. The Memorial Service Building is divided into three spaces. On the east is a lounge and meeting room. The southwest corner has a multi-purpose room with serving counters, and a kitchen. The remainder of the space west of the central hallway is given over to offices and restrooms. Finishes here are also plaster and stained wood.

== History ==
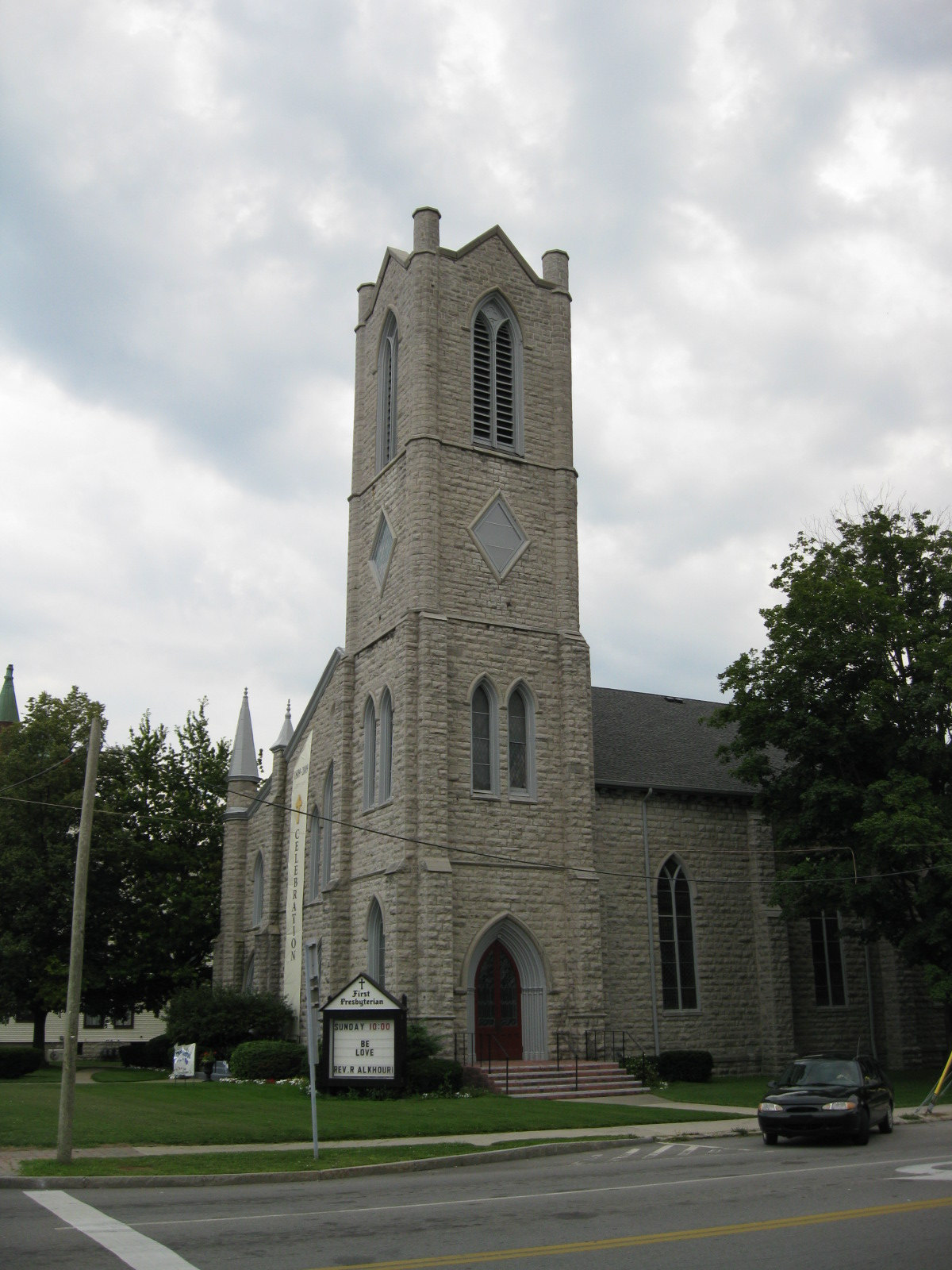
Tower view

The church, the first to be organized in the newly settled community, began as the First Congregational Society in 1809. Nine years later the society was reorganized as a Presbyterian church. This change in name was never recorded with the county clerk, which caused problems in 1853 when the church attempted to sell its original property to move into the current building since the property was still in the name of the Congregational Society. It required an act of the state legislature to resolve.

It is not known who designed the current building, though it may have been the builder. The Gothic Revival styles were beginning to displace earlier, classically inspired modes such as the Federal and Greek Revival among new Protestant churches in the mid-19th century. Even denominations such as the more austere Calvinist denominations that had not embraced the more liturgical style of worship favored by the high church Anglican Ecclesiologists who had been the major proponents of Gothic Revival as the proper form for church buildings, began building churches in that style. The First Presbyterian Church demonstrates this embrace more on the exterior, with its slightly different roof pitches, pointed arches and early Romanesque Revival massing and fenestration, whereas the interior is the open auditorium with dais reflecting services focused primarily on lengthy sermons.

Construction of the building cost $35,000 ($1,209,000 in contemporary dollars), an amount well over the original budget. To furnish the interior, the women of the church gave $675 ($23,000 in contemporary dollars). At the end of construction money was also saved by building the steeple of wood rather than stone.

The first services were held on Thanksgiving Day in November 1855, with the formal dedication taking place the following spring. Within a year of construction, a blizzard knocked the original steeple over. The undamaged bell was put in the current steeple, built of stone as originally planned and paid for with a donation from a new congregant, John Fisher, who later represented the area in Congress.

The church alone sufficed until 1882, when the north half of the Sunday school wing was added on to its rear. Its entrance remains on the west elevation. Six years later the balcony was added to the sanctuary to accommodate a growing congregation.

In 1908, two decades after its construction, the Sunday school wing was doubled in size. In accordance with the Akron Plan developed by Lewis Miller and other influential religious educational theorists of the day, it also was reconfigured into the form of a two-story rotunda with classrooms surrounding the central space on both levels, to provide for a graded Sunday school where children could study the same Biblical lesson as their parents, but in a manner more appropriate to their developmental level, and then return to discuss it as a group. This was an increasingly common design or redesign for American Protestant churches of the era.

After World War I, the last piece of the current complex, the Memorial Service Building, was erected. Its use of the Arts and Crafts style reflects that mode's pre-eminence at the time, particularly among YMCA buildings. Elbert Hubbard, leader of the Roycroft community in the nearby village of East Aurora, extolled traditional Protestant virtues of honesty, perseverance and personal responsibility, further contributing to the popularity of the Arts and Crafts style in religious architecture across denominations.

With the installation of a new pipe organ in 1923, the first changes to the sanctuary were made. The original chancel had a small organ on one side of the dais with space for a small choir on the right of the pulpit. The newer, larger organ required two sets of pipes, and they were on both sides of the dais, with Tudor Gothic wood screens. A larger space was provided for a choir on the right. These changes reflected the growing use of music in the service.

In 1928 the church reached its peak membership with 1,485 congregants. The last change to the sanctuary, in 1954, was the last step in moving from the sermon-based services of the church's founding to the more liturgical services Protestant congregations had come to prefer. Pulpits and lecterns were added on either side of the centrally located dais steps, and the choir pews were placed behind them. On the wall behind them the original pendant tracery was replaced with the current rose window. The original box pews were replaced with the current open oak pews.

The church began the first of several renovations near the end of the century. A general renovation campaign began in 1994 and was completed in 1998. In 2003 a yearlong renovation of the bell tower began. Under new pastor Roula Alkhouri, the first Syrian woman to be ordained as a Presbyterian minister, the church began assessing needs for a long-term capital project.

== See also ==
- National Register of Historic Places listings in Genesee County, New York
