= Bob Beyer =

American basketball coach (born 1961)

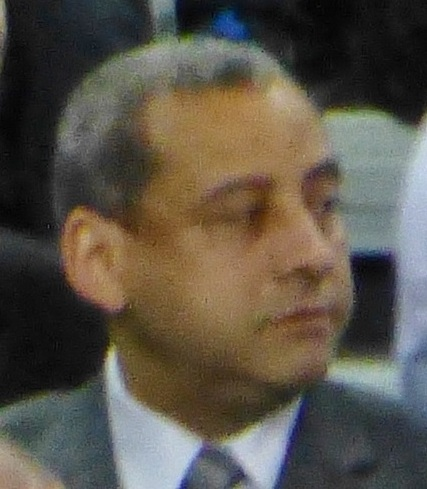
- Beyer in 2013 as a Golden State Warriors assistant coach

Los Angeles Lakers
- Position: Assistant coach
- League: NBA

Personal information
- Born: December 10, 1961 (age 64) LeRoy, New York, U.S.

Career information
- College: Alfred (1980–1983)
- Coaching career: 1983–present

Career history

Coaching
- 1983–1984: Alfred (assistant)
- 1985–1989: Albany (assistant)
- 1989–1993: Siena (assistant)
- 1993–1994: Wisconsin (assistant)
- 1994–1997: Siena
- 1997–2000: Northwestern (assistant)
- 2001–2003: Texas Tech (assistant)
- 2003–2004: Toronto Raptors (assistant)
- 2005–2007: Dayton (assistant)
- 2007–2012: Orlando Magic (assistant)
- 2012–2013: Golden State Warriors (assistant)
- 2013–2014: Charlotte Bobcats (assistant)
- 2014–2018: Detroit Pistons (assistant)
- 2018–2019: Oklahoma City Thunder (assistant)
- 2019–2020: Sacramento Kings (assistant)
- 2020–2021: New Orleans Pelicans (assistant)
- 2022–2024: Charlotte Hornets (assistant)
- 2024–present: Los Angeles Lakers (assistant)

Career highlights
- As assistant coach: East Coast Athletic Conference tournament champion (1989)

Robert C. Beyer (born December 10, 1961) is an American professional basketball coach who is as an assistant coach for the Los Angeles Lakers of the National Basketball Association (NBA).

== Early life and education ==
Beyer was born in LeRoy, New York and graduated from Alfred University in 1984 with a bachelor's degree in history with minors in coaching, writing, and secondary education. At Alfred, Beyer played three seasons on the basketball team before suffering a career-ending injury. Beyer served as assistant coach to the team as a senior in the 1983–84 season. Beyer then earned his master's degree in curriculum planning and development from the University of Albany in 1989.

== Career ==
As a graduate student at Albany, Beyer was an assistant coach for the Albany Great Danes men's basketball team from 1985 to 1989. Beyer then was an assistant coach at Siena College from 1989 to 1993 and the University of Wisconsin from 1993 to 1994. Beyer returned to Siena to be head coach from 1994 to 1997. He returned to the assistant coaching ranks with Northwestern University from 1997 to 2000. Under Bob Knight, Beyer was an assistant coach at Texas Tech from 2001 to 2003. For the 2003–04 season, Beyer was an assistant coach with the Toronto Raptors of the NBA; he was an advance scout the next season.

On July 3, 2007, Beyer was one of four assistants hired to serve under head coach of the NBA's Orlando Magic, Stan Van Gundy, for the 2007–08 season.

The Golden State Warriors of the NBA hired Beyer on September 11, 2012.

On July 1, 2013, Beyer was hired by the Charlotte Bobcats as an assistant coach for the 2013–14 season.

On May 30, 2014, Beyer was one of three assistants hired to serve under new Detroit Pistons head coach Stan Van Gundy.

On August 20, 2018, Beyer was hired by the Oklahoma City Thunder as an assistant coach.

On June 14, 2019, Beyer was hired by the Sacramento Kings as an assistant coach.

On November 16, 2020, Beyer was hired as assistant coach by the New Orleans Pelicans.

On August 2, 2022, Beyer was hired by the Charlotte Hornets as an assistant coach.

On August 5, 2024, Brooks joined the Los Angeles Lakers coaching staff as an assistant coach for head coach JJ Redick.

== Head coaching record ==
Record table
Season	Team	Overall	Conference	Standing	Postseason
Siena Saints (Metro Atlantic Athletic Conference) (1994–1997)
1994–95	Siena	8–19	5–9	T–6th	
1995–96	Siena	5–22	1–13	8th	
1996–97	Siena	9–18	4–10	T–6th	
Siena:		22–59	10–32		
Total:		22–59			
