= Keeney House (Le Roy, New York) =

Historic house in New York, United States

- U.S. National Register of Historic Places
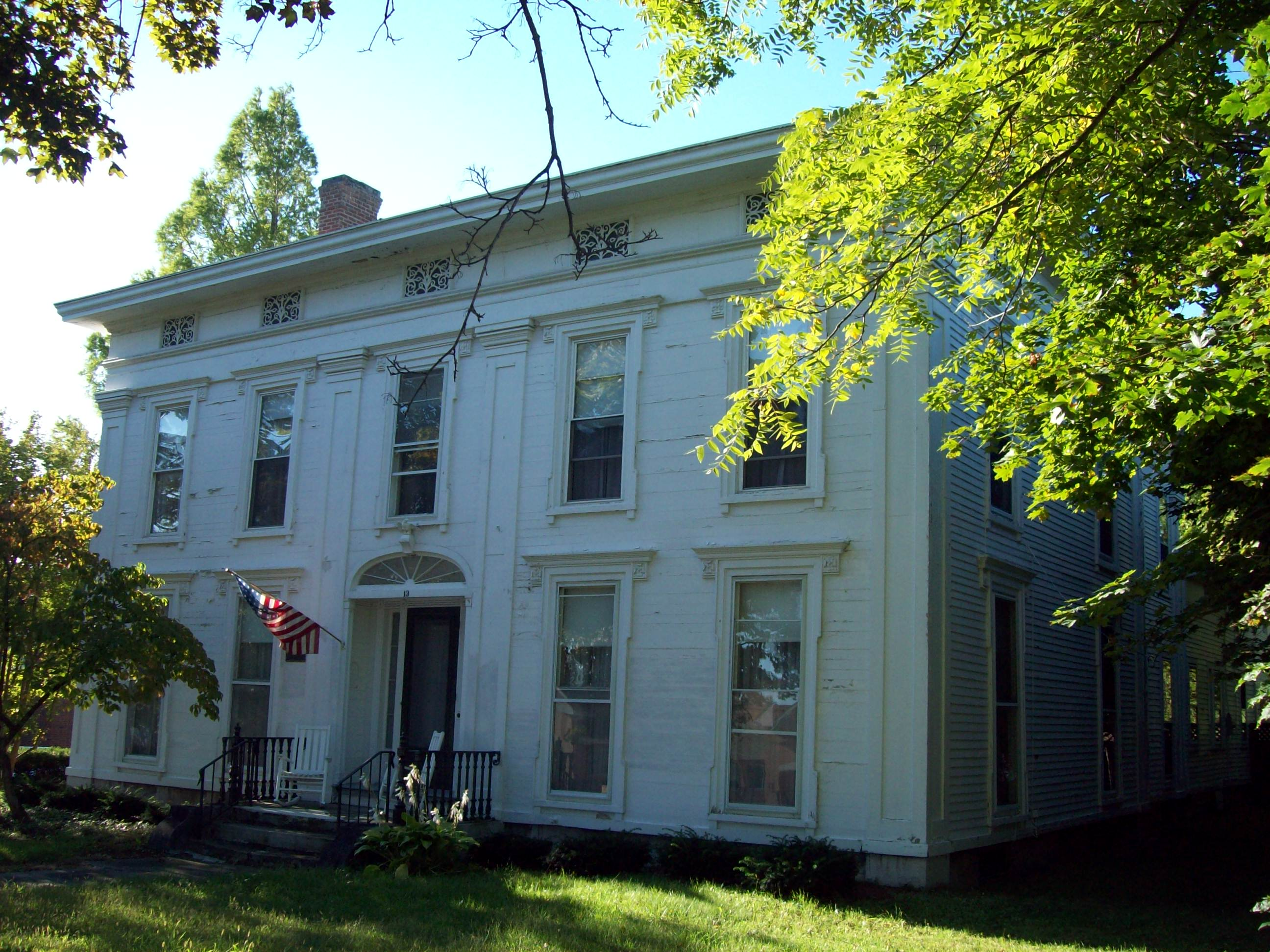
- North elevation and west profile, 2010

- Location within New York Location within the United States
- Interactive map showing Kenney House’s location
- Location: Le Roy, NY
- Nearest city: Batavia
- Coordinates: 42°58′38″N 77°59′35″W
- Area: 0.75 acres (3,000 m^{2})
- Built: 1851
- Architect: Philo L. Pierson; Bryant Fleming
- Architectural style: Federal Revival
- NRHP reference No.: 79001583
- Added to NRHP: September 11, 1979

The Keeney House is located on Main Street (New York State Route 5) in Le Roy, New York, United States. It is a two-story wood frame house dating to the mid-19th century. Inside it has elaborately detailed interiors. It is surrounded by a landscaped front and back yard.

Originally it was in the Greek Revival architectural style, with more elaborate decoration on its main facade. During the late 19th and early 20th centuries, it was home to horticulturist Calvin N. Kenney (1849–1930), breeder of the stringless bean. In 1927, the home was renovated in the Federal Revival style by Bryant Fleming, leaving it with a more restrained main facade. The house and its carriage house were listed on the National Register of Historic Places in 1979.

== Buildings and grounds ==
The house is located on a three-quarter–acre (3,000 m^{2}) lot, more than twice as deep as it is wide, on the south side of Main Street, just east of its intersection with Lake and Clay streets (New York State Route 19) in the center of the village. Most of the neighboring properties are large non-residential structures: a supermarket to the west, the village hall to the east with Le Roy's commercial district on the other side of Route 19, and another large commercial structure to the north across the street. A block of residences begins to the northwest. The terrain begins to slope slightly downward to the east and Oatka Creek at that point.

Mature trees and shrubs are planted throughout the landscaped lot. The house sits on a slight rise, with slight terraces climbing up to it from the street. A line of trees screens the property from the village hall property on the east, next to a driveway to the carriage house, and a decorative wooden fence runs from the carriage house along the rear boundary.

The building itself has a two-and-a-half-story five-by-two-bay wood frame main block on a stone foundation with two rear wings and a kitchen extension. It is topped with a shallow pitched gabled roof covered in composition tiles and pierced by a brick chimney. The western of the two rear wings is two stories high, the eastern, with the living room, one. Between them a long extension ends in a recessed porch. There is another porch on the east side, from the living room wing to beyond the middle of the extension.

Siding consists of clapboard on all facades save the north (front), which uses flushboard. All windows have low-relief molded surrounds and flat cornices. That face's central bay, with the main entrance, is framed by full-height square recessed Doric pilasters, which repeat at the corners. They support a wide molded frieze, above which are small windows with decorative grillwork. Above them is the roof's wide overhanging cornice.

Similar Doric pilasters trim the corners of the rear and wings. At the rear of the kitchen extension, the porch has arches on the sides and square Doric piers on the south. Above them a Palladian window is in the gable field.

The recessed main entrance is flanked by narrow sidelights and topped with a fanlight. It leads into a long central hall, flanked by a parlor and sitting room at the front. Both have fireplaces with wooden Greek Revival mantels. Arched alcoves flank the parlor fireplaces. Greek Revival woodwork also frames the doors and entryways, and both ceilings have crown molding and a blank frieze.

An ornate staircase leads up to the second floor. There the wide central hall divides similarly appointed bedrooms and a study. A suite is located at the end of the south extension.

The carriage house is also a frame structure. Its roof is double-gabled on the east side, with two brick chimneys and a latticework cupola. It and the gables are topped with finials. The main entrance on the north is a pedimented portico, supported by two narrow columns rising from stone walls that extend from either side of the main entrance. They are flanked by two sash windows. A circular window fills the gable field above.

== History ==
The house was built in 1851 by local contractor Philo Pierson for claim agent John Bixby. The two-story rear wing was probably built first, to serve as a temporary residence while the rest of the house went up. The main block combines a late Federal-style form with Greek Revival detailing.

Calvin Keeney, a Le Roy native, bought the house from Bixby in 1881. He had left school to join his father's produce business after the Civil War, and ultimately became his father's partner. In 1868 he had hired a Rochester seedman to help develop the stringless bean. Keeney would later be credited with developing 17 varieties of the vegetable, which helped make canning cheaper. He himself started a local cannery and salt works before his death.

In 1927 Buffalo architect Bryant Fleming was commissioned to do renovations on the house. He removed a veranda that had been installed around 1900 along with much of the front facade's three-dimensional decoration, making it more of a pure Federal building. To make up for the veranda he had the front lawn terraced and accentuated the front entrance with the fanlight and flanking pilasters, reinforcing those already found on the corners. The fenestration was further enhanced with square plaques at either side of the window heads and the grillwork windows in the attic.

In the rear he had the servants' quarters converted into the porch and added the Palladian window. Inside, he had the two front rooms on the east side combined into a large parlor. He also landscaped the backyard.

There have been no other significant changes to the house since. After Keeney's death, his daughter Ruth inherited the house. She helped establish the YWCA and Girl Scouts at the national level, and organized the Le Roy Historical Society in her hometown. From her the property passed to her niece Elinor Townsend. Currently, the property is owned by William and Susan Schmidt.

== See also ==
- National Register of Historic Places listings in Genesee County, New York
