= Lake Street Historic District (Bergen, New York) =

Historic district in New York, United States

- U.S. National Register of Historic Places
- U.S. Historic district
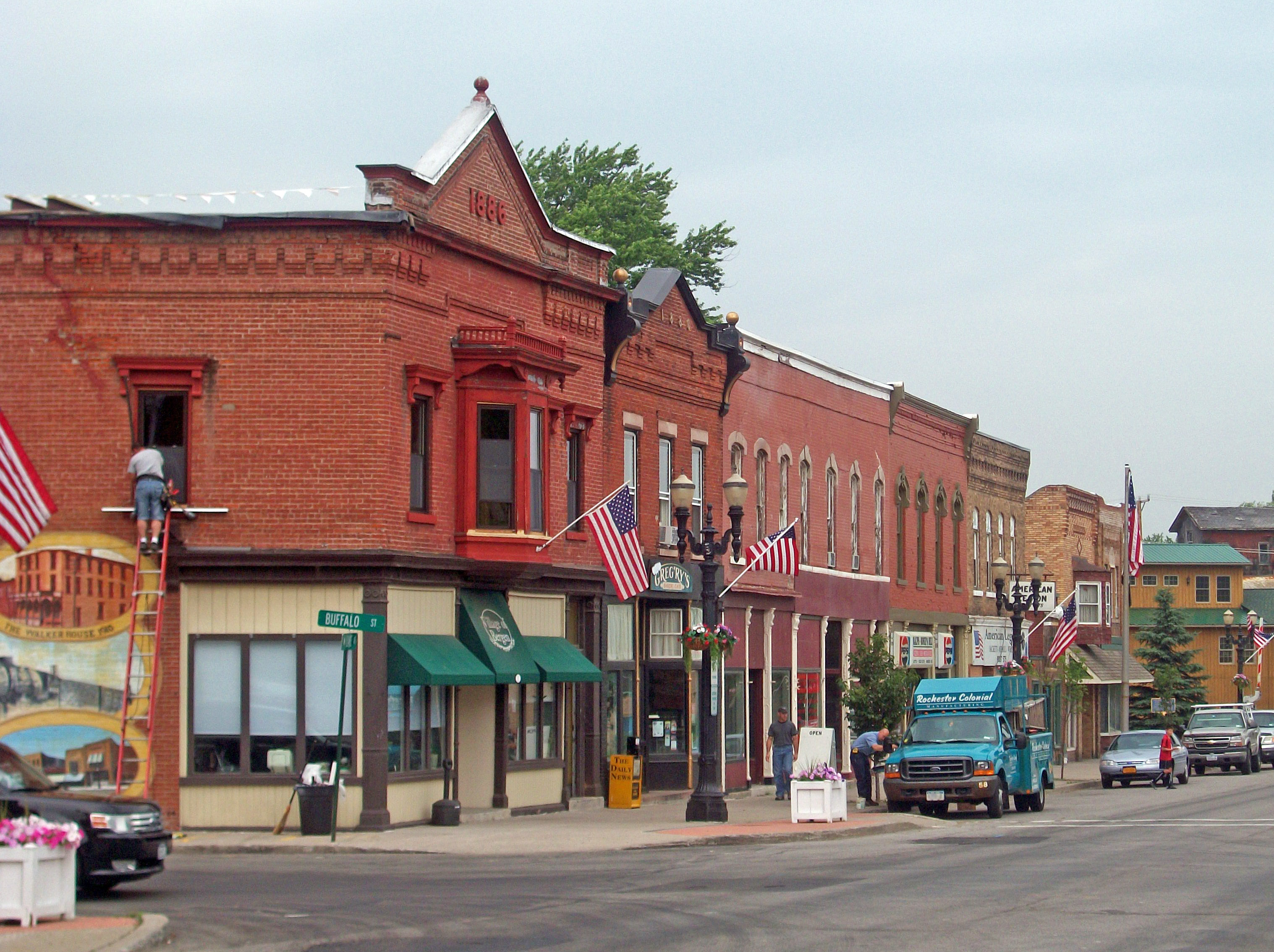
- Buildings on North Lake Street, 2010

- Location within New York Location within the United States
- Location: Bergen, NY
- Nearest city: Batavia
- Coordinates: 43°5′7″N 77°56′33″W
- Area: 2.3 acres (9,300 m^{2})
- Built: 1880–1921
- Architectural style: Romanesque Revival
- NRHP reference No.: 85001953
- Added to NRHP: September 5, 1985

The Lake Street Historic District is located along the west side of that street, state highway NY 19, in downtown Bergen, New York, United States. It contains several of Romanesque Revival style buildings from the last decades of the 19th century and the first two of the early 20th. Most were built after the village banned wooden buildings following two devastating fires in the area. One is currently used as Bergen's municipal building.

Several of the buildings have intact cast iron storefronts. It was designated a historic district and listed on the National Register of Historic Places in 1985.

== Geography and buildings ==
The district consists of 11 buildings along the west side of the street. Two, 10 and 12 South Lake Street, are south of Buffalo Street. The remainder, 11–27 North Lake, are to the north. The CSX railroad tracks bound the district on the north. All fill most of their lots, for a total area of 2.3 acres (9,300 m^{2}) and are contributing properties to the district's historic character.

All but one, 23 North Lake Street, are two-story structures with flat roofs. Many have decorative details such as cornices with corbels, brackets and dentils. Another common feature is the cast iron storefronts, most of which have similar decorative details and remain intact from their original construction. The upper stories are used for offices and residences.

The 11 buildings are:

- 10 South Lake Street, a two-story, four-bay flat-roofed brick Romanesque Revival structure with a cast iron storefront. It was built in 1888, with the original cast-iron cornice replaced in 1930.
- Masonic Temple, 12 South Lake Street. The organization built this to replace its original building, destroyed in the 1906 fire. It is also a two-story brick building with a flat roof, but is only two bays wide, with large tripartite windows and segmental arch treatments.
- Tulley Block, 11 North Lake Street. The same size, shape and material as 10 South Lake, its front facade is topped with a pedimented parapet with "1886", the year of its construction, in the entablature and a finial rising from the crest. A similar feature on the 10-bay south facade, along Buffalo Street, has "Tulley Block" in the entablature, and a mural of scenes from local history. The second story has a projecting bay window with a small cast iron balustrade. It is currently used as the village hall.
- 13 North Lake Street. One of the first new buildings erected after the 1880 fire, it is like the others to the south save for its three-bay width. It, too, has a parapet and pediment with date in the entablature. The cast iron storefront retains its original metal coping, corbel, finials and brackets.
- 15 North Lake Street. A copy of its neighbor to the south, built a year later with no parapet. The cornice was altered in 1906 and a brick veneer was added around 1950.
- 17 North Lake Street. A four-bay structure otherwise similar to its southern neighbor.
- 19 North Lake Street. Similar in size, shape and material to 17 North Lake. Storefront is unaltered, and window lintels are stone segmental arches.
- Sackett-Merrill-White American Legion Home, 21 North Lake Street. Another two-story four-bay building dating to 1881. Its distinctive features are a detailed corbeled cornice and segmental arched windows with radiating voussoirs.
- 23 North Lake Street. The youngest contributing property in the district, and the only one to be one story. This small grocery store was built in 1921, with stone coping and decorative brickwork. Its storefront is still the original cast iron.
- 25 North Lake Street. A single-bay building otherwise similar to its other neighbors. Built in 1913, it has similar decorative brickwork to its neighbor at 21 and a detailed corbelled cornice. The second story bay window was resided in shingle in 1971, the storefront has also been altered.
- Housel Bank, 27 North Lake Street. Three bays wide and otherwise similar, this dates to 1906. It has a corbeled cornice and the only quoins in the district. The second story has tripartite windows with flat brick arches. Its storefront was also altered in 1971.

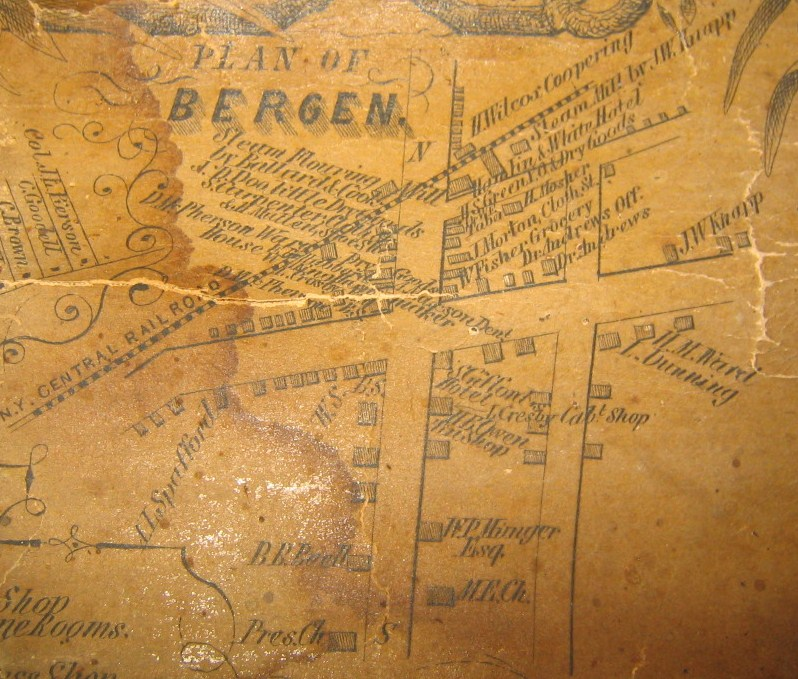
1854 map of Bergen

== History ==
Bergen, first settled in 1801, began growing as a small hamlet that served the farms around it. This accelerated after 1836 when the Buffalo and Rochester Railroad was built just north of it. The New York Central's absorption of the railroad in 1853 further fueled development. Around the Civil War, Bergen's downtown had four blocks of frame commercial buildings.

In early 1866, a fire destroyed the buildings on three blocks of the west side of Lake Street in the present historic district. The community's economy was strong enough to absorb the loss and rebuild. Growth continued and Bergen incorporated as a village in 1877.

Three years later, another fire in the same area destroyed 45 buildings and structures, 31 of which were businesses. Frame buildings were prohibited as a result, and the replacement buildings were brick. Within two years of the fire the buildings at 13 through 27 North Lake were built, with cast iron storefronts and Romanesque Revival detailing representing the trends of the time. The Tulley Block at the corner with Buffalo Street came along in 1886.

Bergen was at its most prosperous during the next decades. New businesses, such as a cigar factory, creamery and gas and coal works, were built in the area. Another fire, in 1906, destroyed older buildings at the north end of the row. They were replaced more slowly, with only 25 North Lake going up immediately afterwards. Seven years later, in 1913, it was joined by 27 North Lake next door. The two show touches, like patterned brickwork, more typical of early 20th century vernacular commercial buildings. The Masonic Temple, also destroyed in the fire, built a new home at 12 South Lake Street.

The empty space left by the 1906 fire was finally filled in 1921 with 23 Lake Street, a grocery store that is today the only one-story building in the district. That would be the last significant building in it. Bergen and its industries went into decline in the Great Depression. The Housel Bank at 27 North Lake closed. Later the railroads were displaced by the construction of interstates such as the nearby Interstate 490 and New York State Thruway. In an attempt under urban renewal in the late 1960s and early 1970s to revive Bergen's downtown, the east side of Lake Street was largely demolished in favor of newer buildings.

The village has subsequently recovered somewhat as a bedroom community midway between the larger communities of Rochester and Batavia. The village has made Tulley Block its offices, and some of the storefronts are home to businesses again. A few have been altered, but the district retains its historical appearance.

== See also ==
- National Register of Historic Places listings in Genesee County, New York
