= First Presbyterian Church of Le Roy =

Historic church in New York, United States

- U.S. National Register of Historic Places
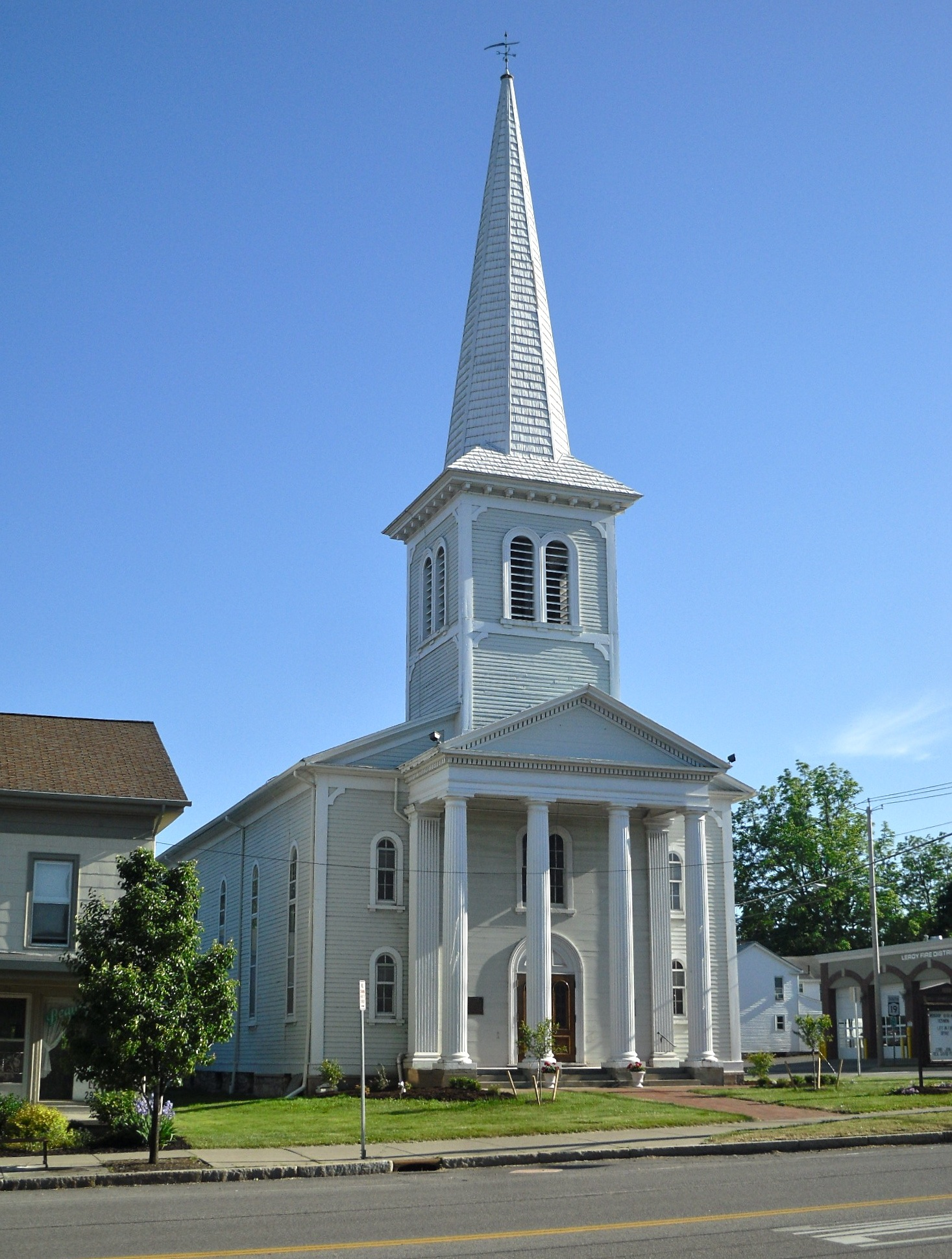
- First Presbyterian Church of Le Roy, May 2010

- Location within New York Location within the United States
- Location: 7 Clay St., Le Roy, New York
- Coordinates: 42°58′38″N 77°59′40″W
- Area: Less than 1 acre (0.40 ha)
- Built: c. 1825-1826, 1866, c. 1880, 1898-1899, 1913, c. 1929-1951
- Architect: C. Ivan Cromwell; Claude Bragdon
- Architectural style: Italianate, Colonial Revival, Queen Anne
- NRHP reference No.: 14000577
- Added to NRHP: September 10, 2014

First Presbyterian Church of Le Roy is a historic Presbyterian church located at Le Roy, Genesee County, New York. The church was built about 1825–1826, in the traditional meeting house style and consisted of a gable-roofed main block with a bell tower and an engaged center pavilion. It was later renovated in the Italianate style in 1866. Additions were made to the original building in 1898–1899, 1913, and 1951 and, between about 1929 and 1951, the current Roman Doric portico was added. The 1913 Sunday School addition designed by Claude Bragdon, the portico, and the 1951 Elizabeth Allen Olmsted Memorial Hall are in the Colonial Revival style. Also on the property is the contributing former manse; a two-story Queen Anne-style brick building built about 1880.

It was listed on the National Register of Historic Places in 2014.
