= Augustus S. Tyron House =

Historic house in New York, United States

- U.S. National Register of Historic Places
- Location within New York Location within the United States
- Location: 15 Church St., Le Roy, New York
- Coordinates: 42°58′47″N 77°59′17″W
- Area: Less than 1 acre (0.40 ha)
- Built: 1867; 159 years ago
- Architectural style: Italianate
- NRHP reference No.: 13000074
- Added to NRHP: March 13, 2013; 13 years ago

Augustus S. Tyron House, also known as the Tryon-Prentice-Powers House, is a historic home located at Le Roy, Genesee County, New York. It was built in 1867, and is a two-story, Italianate style frame dwelling with a recessed two-story wing. It features a hipped roof with overhanging eaves and brackets, bay window with second story porch, and a full-width, one-story porch, also with decorative brackets.

It was listed on the National Register of Historic Places in 2013.
