= 1970 Lehigh Valley Railroad derailment =

Contamination event and superfund site

- Location within New York

Details
- Date: December 6, 1970; 55 years ago 3:30 AM
- Location: Le Roy, Genesee County, New York
- Coordinates: 42.992249°N 77.9333°W
- Country: USA
- Line: Lehigh Valley Railroad Main Line
- Incident type: Derailment
- Cause: Overheated journal box

Statistics
- Trains: Single eastbound 114-car freight train
- Damage: Significant Hazmat spill

Information
- CERCLIS ID: NYD986950251
- Contaminants: Trichloroethene (TCE)
- Responsible parties: Lehigh Valley Railroad (and corporate successors)

Progress
- Proposed: July 28, 1998
- Listed: January 19, 1999

The 1970 Lehigh Valley Railroad derailment was a train derailment in the town of Le Roy, New York, that resulted in a toxic chemical spill severe enough to qualify as a Superfund site. As of 2024, the site is still undergoing remediation.

== Event ==
At approximately 3:30 AM on December 6, 1970, 25 cars from an eastbound 114-car freight train operated by the Lehigh Valley Railroad derailed in the town, rupturing and spilling approximately 2,000 pounds of cyanide crystals, and 30,000 to 35,000 gallons of the solvent trichloroethylene.

The train originated at Niagara Falls, New York, and was bound for Sayre, Pennsylvania. The wreck was caused by an overheated journal box on the 70th car. The car was dragged a quarter of a mile upright and then derailed when it hit a switch. The first 69 cars and the last 20 cars remained on the tracks.

The day after the incident, a local health official was interviewed:

Constantine C. Markellis, environmental health engineer for the Genesee County Health Department, deplored the health and safety hazard, and expressed criticism of railroads' maintenance when dangerous and toxic materials are being transported in increasingly large amounts.

"We're going to see more and more of this," Markellis observed ruefully.

== Cleanup attempts ==
The cyanide crystals were removed, but the trichloroethylene had soaked into the ground and contaminated at least two nearby wells, producing a noticeable smell and solvent properties. The Lehigh Valley Railroad attempted to eliminate the smell in the spill area by pumping approximately 1 million gallons of water from a nearby flooded quarry and saturating the cleanup zone with it, then allowing the water to seep into the ground. This resulted in the trichloroethylene further saturating groundwater in the area, with many more wells becoming contaminated, with approximately 50 wells testing positive for TCE from 1990 to 1994. The Lehigh Valley Railroad began supplying affected homes with drinking water beginning in 1971, and later provided filter systems for contaminated wells.

== Today ==
The site of the Lehigh Valley Railroad derailment is currently considered an EPA Superfund site, and is monitored by both the United States Environmental Protection Agency and the New York State Department of Environmental Conservation. The former Lehigh Valley Railroad line where the derailment took place was abandoned.

== 2011 LeRoy school investigation ==
Beginning in August 2011, 14 students (13 girls and 1 boy) from the LeRoy Junior-Senior High School began reporting myriad perplexing medical symptoms including verbal outbursts, tics, seizure activity, and speech difficulty. In mid-January, 5 days after a community meeting in which the New York State Department of Health stated that their diagnosis could not be revealed publicly due to privacy concerns, two of the girls appeared on NBC's Today Show to discuss their frustration with not getting adequate answers. The next day, Dr. Laszlo Mechtler, a neurologist treating most of the girls, was given permission to share the diagnosis of conversion disorder and mass psychogenic illness.

Unsatisfied with the results of the investigation, the girls and their parents spoke out publicly against their diagnosis, stating that they believed the situation warranted further scrutiny from outside sources. Alternative medical theories for condition were suggested, including Tourette syndrome and PANDAS, which Dr. Mechtler and his team ruled out as possibilities. Erin Brockovich, noted environmental activist, was called to town to investigate environmental pollution from the 1970 Lehigh Valley Railroad derailment as a possible cause. During this time, many of the girls appeared in the local and national media, as well as posting on social media. As this happened, many of these girls started reporting worse symptoms to their doctors and the illness spread to 20 individuals in total.

Eventually, as doctors encouraged their patients to stay away from the media and the media attention died down, many of the girls' symptoms improved. By the end of the school year in June, one girl was diagnosed with Tourette syndrome, likely the source of the mass psychogenic illness, and most of the girls who received treatment for conversion disorder were back to normal in time for graduation. No environmental causes were found after repeat testing around the school and surrounding areas of town.
