= Le Roy (village), New York =

Le Roy, New York
- Village
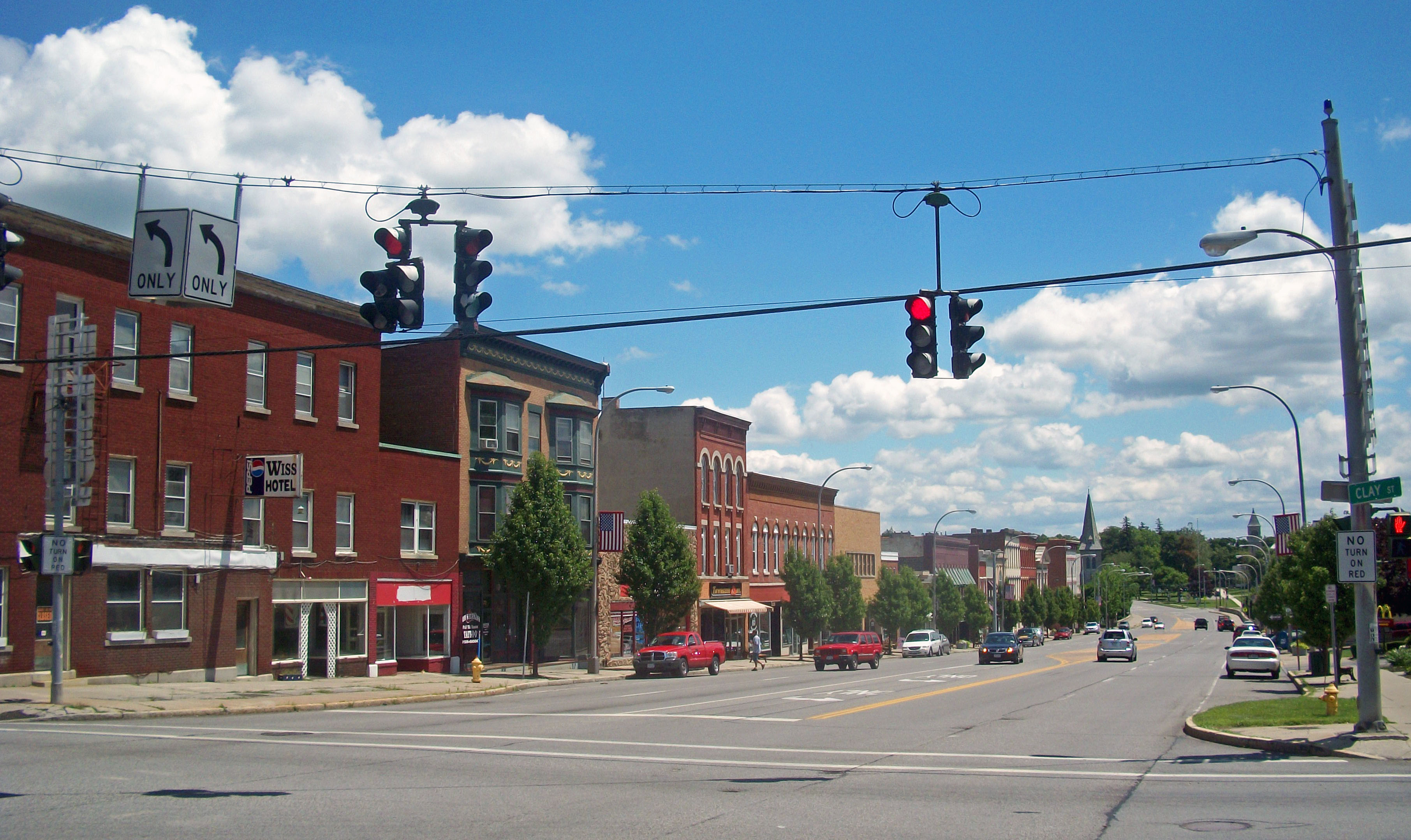
- Downtown, looking east along Main Street (NY 5) from Clay and Lake street (NY 19) intersection

- Location in Genesee County and the state of New York.

- Location of New York in the United States
- Coordinates: 42°58′39″N 77°59′32″W
- Country: United States
- State: New York
- County: Genesee
- Settled: 1797
- Incorporated: 1834

Government
  - Type: Village Hall
  - Mayor: Greg "Porp" Rogers

Area
  - Total: 2.69 sq mi (6.97 km^{2})
  - Land: 2.69 sq mi (6.97 km^{2})
  - Water: 0 sq mi (0.00 km^{2})
- Highest elevation: 960 ft (290 m)
- Lowest elevation: 820 ft (250 m)

Population (2020)
  - Total: 4,300
  - Density: 1,598.3/sq mi (617.09/km^{2})
- Time zone: UTC-5 (EST)
  - Summer (DST): UTC-4 (EDT)
- ZIP Code: 14482
- Area code: 585
- FIPS code: 36-42026
- GNIS feature ID: 0955133
- Wikimedia Commons: Le Roy, New York
- Website: Village of Le Roy

Le Roy is a village in Genesee County, New York, United States. The population was 4,391 at the 2010 census. The village lies in the center of the town of Le Roy at the intersection of State Routes 5 and 19.

== History ==
Prior to its incorporation in 1834, the first settlements in the village were to the east of the present village site.

The village was an early center for the manufacture of patent medicines by companies such as S. C. Wells & Co. and household chemicals. Products produced in Le Roy included Mustarine, a patent mustard-plaster compound, and Rough On Rats, a rodent poison. Earliest businesses in the village are the Bank of LeRoy (founded 1834, now Bank of America) and the Gazette-News newspaper (defunct 1993). Le Roy is the birthplace of Jell-O. The original factory where the dessert was manufactured was closed in 1964 by General Foods. Although it is no longer in use, the building still stands to this day.

Le Roy holds the Oatka Festival every summer, the tradition originating in 1989. This festival includes celebration of the rich culture and history of the local area with vendors and several local businesses and restaurants participating each year.

The First Presbyterian Church of Le Roy, Keeney House, Machpelah Cemetery, Le Roy House and Union Free School, Augustus S. Tyron House, U.S. Post Office, and Marion Steam Shovel are listed on the National Register of Historic Places.

== Geography ==
Le Roy is located in eastern Genesee County at 42°58′32″N 77°59′26″W (42.975656, -77.990792), southwest of the center of the town of Elba.

According to the United States Census Bureau, the village has a total area of 2.7 sq mi (7.0 km^{2}), of which 1.65 acres (6,678 m^{2}) is water.

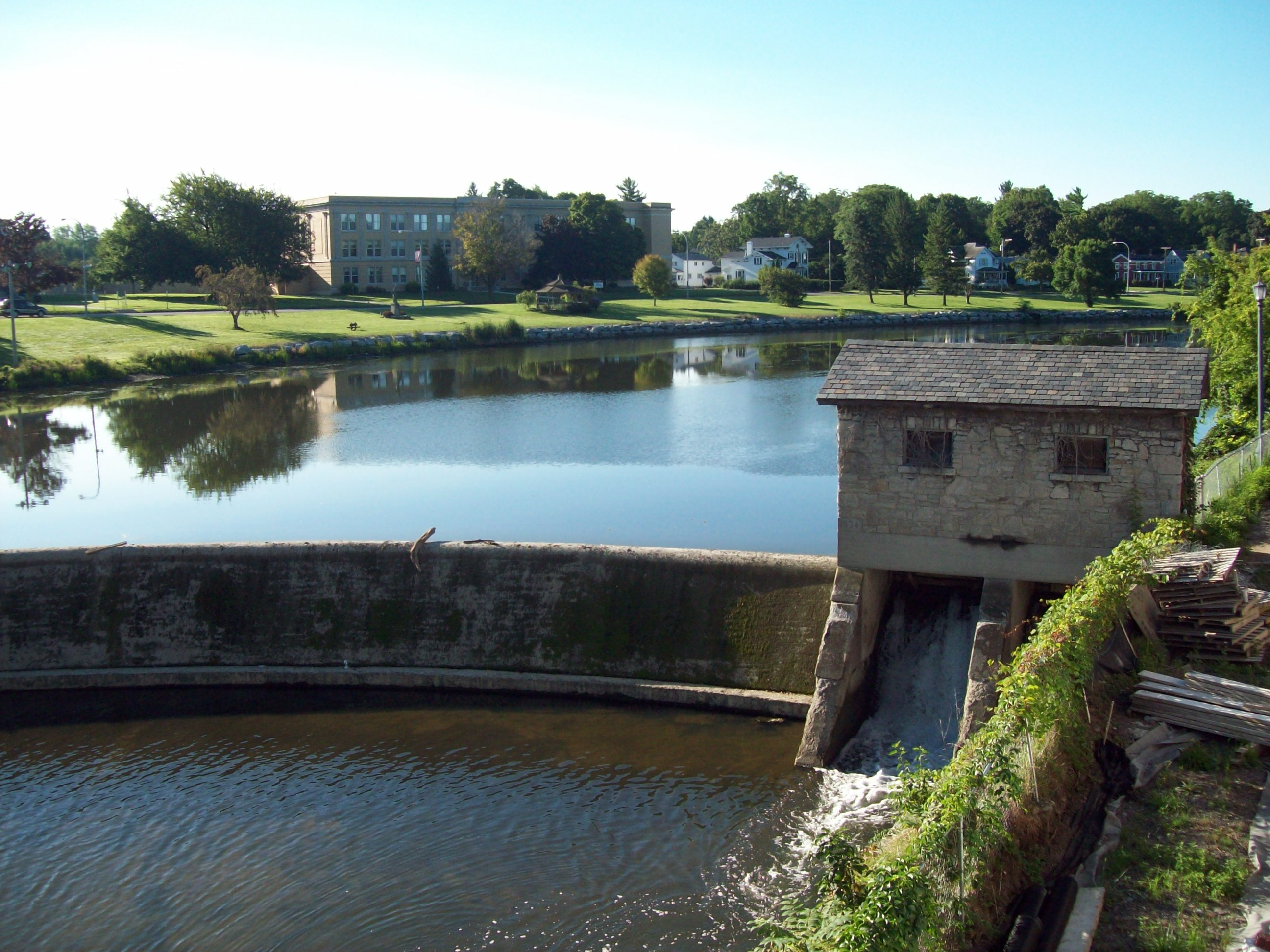
Oatka Creek, dammed to create a reservoir in the village

Oatka Creek, a tributary of the Genesee River, flows through the village.

New York State Route 19 intersects New York State Route 5 in LeRoy. NY 19 (Lake Street to the north, Clay Street to the south) leads north 8 miles (13 km) to Bergen and south 19 miles (31 km) to Warsaw. NY 5 (Main Street) leads east 7 miles (11 km) to Caledonia and west 10 miles (16 km) to Batavia, the Genesee County seat. Interstate 90, the New York State Thruway, passes north of Le Roy, with access from Exit 47 (I-490/NY 19) 4.5 miles (7.2 km) north of the village.

== Demographics ==
Historical population
Census	Pop.	Note	%±
1870	2,634		—
1890	2,743		—
1900	3,144		14.6%
1910	3,771		19.9%
1920	4,203		11.5%
1930	4,474		6.4%
1940	4,413		−1.4%
1950	4,721		7.0%
1960	4,662		−1.2%
1970	5,118		9.8%
1980	4,900		−4.3%
1990	4,974		1.5%
2000	4,462		−10.3%
2010	4,391		−1.6%
2020	4,300		−2.1%
U.S. Decennial Census

As of the census of 2000, there were 4,462 people, 1,845 households, and 1,114 families residing in the village. The population density was 1,654.8 inhabitants per square mile (638.9/km^{2}). There were 1,980 housing units at an average density of 734.3 per square mile (283.5/km^{2}). The racial makeup of the village was 94.73% White, 2.47% Black or African American, 0.38% Native American, 0.56% Asian, 0.02% Pacific Islander, 0.22% from other races, and 1.61% from two or more races. Hispanic or Latino of any race were 0.92% of the population.

There were 1,845 households, out of which 29.7% had children under the age of 18 living with them, 44.1% were married couples living together, 11.5% had a female householder with no husband present, and 39.6% were non-families. 33.3% of all households were made up of individuals, and 14.5% had someone living alone who was 65 years of age or older. The average household size was 2.35 and the average family size was 3.04.

In the village, the population was spread out, with 25.0% under the age of 18, 7.3% from 18 to 24, 28.6% from 25 to 44, 21.7% from 45 to 64, and 17.4% who were 65 years of age or older. The median age was 38 years. For every 100 females, there were 87.4 males. For every 100 females age 18 and over, there were 82.0 males.

The median income for a household in the village was $33,168, and the median income for a family was $43,594. Males had a median income of $36,740 versus $21,306 for females. The per capita income for the village was $18,565. About 6.1% of families and 7.3% of the population were below the poverty line, including 7.1% of those under age 18 and 10.1% of those age 65 or over.

== Notable people ==
- Bob Beyer, assistant basketball coach currently with the Sacramento Kings
- Warren A. Cowdery, early leader in the Latter Day Saint movement
- Paulina Kellogg Wright Davis, abolitionist
- Graham N. Fitch, former US senator from Indiana, brigade commander in the Union Army during the American Civil War
- John Ganson, former congressman
- Augustus P. Hascall, former congressman
- S. Percy Hooker, former New York state senator
- Emily E. Ingham, founded former Ingham University
- William Lathrop, former congressman from Illinois
- Mary Macaulay, first woman telegrapher to hold a national elective office in a union
- Lorenzo Sawyer, former judge on the United States Court of Appeals for the Ninth Circuit
- Vince Scott, CFL player
