= Le Roy, New York =

Le Roy, New York Bellona
- Town
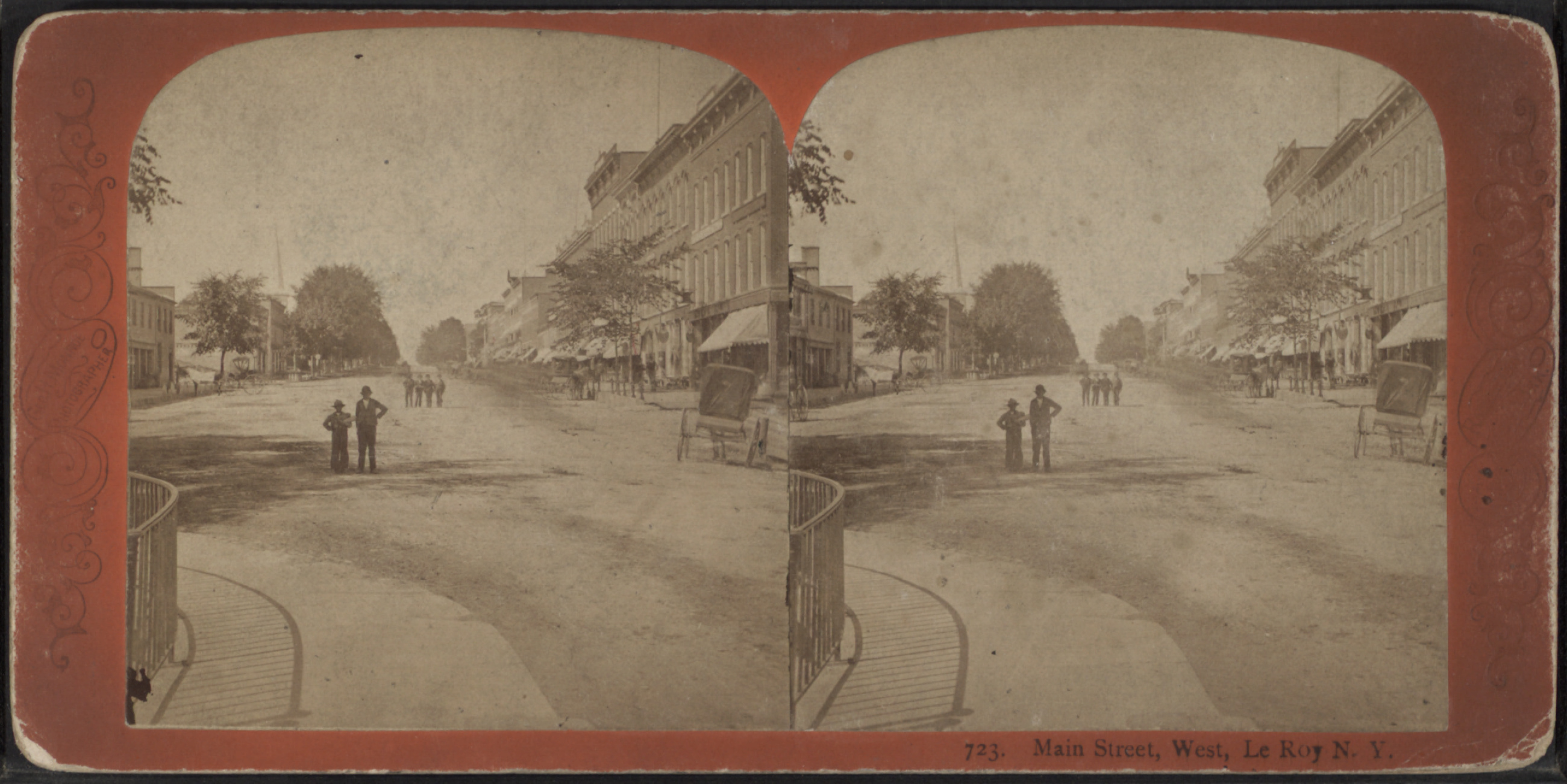
- Main Street in Le Roy looking west, from Robert N. Dennis collection of stereoscopic views

- Location in Genesee County and the state of New York.
- Coordinates: 42°58′39″N 077°59′32″W
- Country: United States
- State: New York
- County: Genesee

Government
  - Type: Town Council
  - Town Supervisor: Steve Barbeau
  - Town Council: Members' list: • Joseph L. Merica; • Kelly Lathan; • Thomas V. Stella; • Christine M. Smith

Area
  - Total: 42.17 sq mi (109.23 km^{2})
  - Land: 42.09 sq mi (109.00 km^{2})
  - Water: 0.089 sq mi (0.23 km^{2})

Population (2020)
  - Total: 7,662
  - Density: 182.1/sq mi (70.29/km^{2})
- Time zone: UTC-5 (Eastern (EST))
  - Summer (DST): UTC-4 (EDT)
- ZIP Codes: 14482 (Le Roy); 14416 (Bergen); 14143 (Stafford); 14525 (Pavilion)
- Area code: 585
- FIPS code: 36-037-42037
- Website: townofleroyny.gov

Le Roy, or more commonly LeRoy, is a town in Genesee County, New York, United States. The population was 7,662 at the time of the 2020 census. The town is named after one of the original land owners, Herman Le Roy. The town lies in eastern Genesee County. Within the town is the village of Le Roy. The Jell-O gelatin dessert was invented and first manufactured in Le Roy.

== History ==
The area was first settled in 1793. The town of Le Roy was established in 1812 as the "Town of Bellona" from part of the town of Caledonia (Livingston County). The name was later changed to "Le Roy" in 1813, after New York City merchant and land speculator Herman LeRoy.

Henry Clay as a youth during the Civil War, c. 1864, when he served as a company cook for Company I of the 8th New York Heavy Artillery

Henry Clay (1849–1925) and wife Lucinda "Lucy" Ashley Clay (m. 1877). Both born into slavery, they built a prosperous free life in Genesee County, NY.

The post-Civil War era in LeRoy New York saw the establishment of a vibrant community of African American freedom seekers and emancipated individuals. Notably, the village became home to Henry Clay (born February 25, 1849 – died September 13, 1925) and his wife Lucinda "Lucy" Ashley Clay. Henry was Batavia's First Black Civil War Veteran. Born into bondage in Sparta, Hancock County, Georgia to enslaved parents Henry "Hugh" Mayweather and Caroline Williams of Sparta, Hancock County, Georgia. He was later sold to a wealthy plantation owner William Monroe Clay of Washington, Wilkes County, Georgia whose family had sons fighting for the Confederacy.

Forced to accompany his slaveholder to the war, Henry was present at several major battles before both he and his master were taken prisoner by the Union Army following the Battle of Gettysburg in July 1863. During a harrowing attempt to escape, the 14-year-old Henry was bayoneted in the arm following his capture, Henry chose freedom over a return to slavery under the prisoner exchange system, a choice heavily supported by Colonel Peter A. Porter. Henry attached himself to Colonel Porter’s regiment, the 8th New York Heavy Artillery, serving as a company cook for Company I, a unit organized exclusively in Genesee County. He went on to serve with the Union Army through historic campaigns fighting at the Wilderness, Spotsylvania Court House, and North Anna, and the Siege of Petersburg in Virginia as the War entered its most punishing phase.

Notably during that blistering morning of June 3, 1864, at the Battle of Cold Harbor, Henry was part of the gallant, heavily fired-upon detachment that successfully retrieved Colonel Porter's body from the battlefield after the commander was killed in action. He is recognized as the first African American Civil War veteran in Genesee County. Following the war's conclusion, Henry relocated to LeRoy, New York with Captain Cook, later establishing a prosperous life in Batavia. On April 17, 1877, he married Lucinda "Lucy" Ashley. Henry became a highly successful local figure in Batavia, famously running a restaurant right inside the historic New York Central Depot—the very railroad hub that had served as a designated stop for President Abraham Lincoln's funeral train a decade earlier on April 27, 1865. serving as a janitor for the Presbyterian Church for 16 years, working in public buildings in Washington, D.C. and spending the final 30 years of his life as the janitor for the First Bank of Genesee.

On April 17, 1877, he married Lucinda "Lucy" Ashley. Lucy had similarly been born into slavery in Louisville, Kentucky, where she was purchased as a three-year-old toddler for $400 in gold by William Ashley of Nashville, Tennessee. At age eleven, she was brought north during a family trip and left in the household of William's brother, Charles Ashley of LeRoy. The extraordinary documentation of their journeys from bondage to a highly respected and successful free life remains a foundational piece of regional history preserved through contemporary press records and the genealogical research of the Meriwether Society.

The Jell-O gelatin dessert was invented and first manufactured in Le Roy, and the Jell-O Museum is located in the town. General Foods closed the Jell-O factory in 1964 and relocated to Dover, Delaware.

In 1877, local proprietor Schuyler C. Wells constructed a four-story brick building on Church Street to serve as a laboratory and factory for his patent medicine business, S.C. Wells & Co. Following Wells' death in 1897, his son, "Carl" Wells, assumed control of the company, and served as its president until his retirement in 1963. Over the decades that followed, the S.C. Wells building (also known as the Shiloh building or Pennysaver building) was used as a printing and publishing office. In 2023, the LeRoy Pennysaver & News—which had been hosted at the site for over four decades—ceased publication after a run of almost 90 years. The building remains extant, and is in generally good condition.

Le Roy was the home of Calvin Keeney, who was the first breeder to successfully produce a stringless green bean.

Le Roy also has a 100-inch tall, 290 lb. replica of the Statue of Liberty located on Wolcott Street on the banks of Oatka creek.

== Geography ==
According to the United States Census Bureau, the town has a total area of 42.2 square miles (109.2 km^{2}), all land.

The east town line is the border of Monroe and Livingston counties.

Oatka Creek, a tributary of the Genesee River, flows northward through the town and was a source of water power for early mills. The New York State Thruway (Interstate 90) passes across the northern part of the town. The western terminus of Interstate 490 is also here.

The town rests atop the Onondaga Formation which forms an escarpment that faces north and runs east/west, just north of the village. The limestone rock is highly fossiliferous, of Devonian age, and extensively quarried. It is used for road building as crushed rock, and for the manufacture of portland cement. In the eastern part of the town is a community named Lime Rock.

== Demographics ==
Historical population
Census	Pop.	Note	%±
1820	2,611		—
1830	3,909		49.7%
1840	4,323		10.6%
1850	3,473		−19.7%
1860	4,247		22.3%
1870	4,627		8.9%
1880	4,469		−3.4%
1890	4,722		5.7%
1900	4,823		2.1%
1910	5,442		12.8%
1920	5,510		1.2%
1930	6,007		9.0%
1940	5,838		−2.8%
1950	6,275		7.5%
1960	6,779		8.0%
1970	7,991		17.9%
1980	8,019		0.4%
1990	8,176		2.0%
2000	7,790		−4.7%
2010	7,641		−1.9%
2020	7,662		0.3%
U.S. Decennial Census

At the 2000 census there were 7,790 people, 3,037 households, and 2,034 families in the town. The population density was 184.7 inhabitants per square mile (71.3/km^{2}). There were 3,219 housing units at an average density of 76.3 per square mile (29.5/km^{2}). The racial makeup of the town was 96.01% White, 1.87% Black or African American, 0.27% Native American, 0.44% Asian, 0.01% Pacific Islander, 0.21% from other races, and 1.19% from two or more races. Hispanic or Latino people of any race were 0.78%.

Of the 3,037 households 31.9% had children under the age of 18 living with them, 52.3% were married couples living together, 9.8% had a female householder with no husband present, and 33.0% were non-families. 26.9% of households were one person and 11.3% were one person aged 65 or older. The average household size was 2.49 and the average family size was 3.04.

The age distribution was 25.2% under the age of 18, 6.9% from 18 to 24, 29.4% from 25 to 44, 23.5% from 45 to 64, and 15.1% 65 or older. The median age was 38 years. For every 100 females, there were 93.0 males. For every 100 females age 18 and over, there were 89.9 males.

The median household income was $39,690 and the median family income was $49,189. Males had a median income of $36,810 versus $23,024 for females. The per capita income for the town was $19,342. About 3.8% of families and 5.6% of the population were below the poverty line, including 5.0% of those under age 18 and 10.8% of those age 65 or over.

== Communities and locations in the town of Le Roy ==
- Fort Hill – a hamlet in the northwest part of the town, north of Le Roy village on Route 19. It is the site of a prehistoric Native American village.
- Le Roy – a village on Route 5 and Oatka Creek
- Le Roy Airport (5G0) – a small general aviation airport east of the village on Route 5
- Lime Rock – a hamlet on Route 5 near the eastern town line, east of Le Roy village

== 2011 illness outbreak ==
Beginning in August 2011, 14 students (13 girls and one boy) from the LeRoy Junior-Senior High School began reporting perplexing medical symptoms including verbal outbursts, tics, seizure activity and speech difficulty. In mid-January, five days after a community meeting in which the New York State Department of Health stated their diagnosis could not be revealed publicly due to privacy concerns, two of the girls appeared on NBC's Today Show to discuss their frustration with not getting adequate answers.

The next day, Laszlo Mechtler, a neurologist treating most of the girls, was given permission to share the diagnosis of conversion disorder and mass psychogenic illness. Unsatisfied with the investigation's results, the girls and their parents spoke out publicly against their diagnosis, stating they believed the situation warranted further scrutiny from outside sources. Alternative medical theories were suggested, including Tourette syndrome and PANDAS, which Mechtler and his team ruled out. Erin Brockovich, noted environmental activist, was called to town to investigate environmental pollution from the 1970 Lehigh Valley Railroad derailment as a possible cause. During this time, many of the girls appeared in the local and national media, as well as posting on social media. As this happened, the illness spread to 20 individuals. Eventually, as doctors encouraged their patients to stay away from the media and the media attention died down, many of the girls' symptoms improved. By the end of the school year in June, one girl was diagnosed with Tourette syndrome, and most of the girls who received treatment for conversion disorder were healthy in time for graduation. No environmental causes were found after repeated testing around the school and surrounding areas of town.

Bartholomew, Wessely and Rubin questioned in 2012 whether interaction on social media (Facebook, Twitter, YouTube and Internet blogs) contributed to mass psychogenic illness when the adolescent girls reported tic-like movements. Bartholomew et al reported twitching epidemics in the US as early as 1939, and wrote that the Leroy outbreak was the "third recorded school outbreak of conversion disorder with motor disturbances to occur in the USA since 2002", but the first in which reports of affected individuals spread via social networks.

In 2025, neurologist Jennifer McVige, Mechtler, and colleagues published an assessment of 15 students and an adult seen at the Dent Neurologic Institute. The assessment concluded that the cases constituted mass psychogenic illness.

== Notable people ==
- Bob Beyer, current NBA assistant coach with the Los Angeles Lakers
- Seth M. Gates, former U.S. congressman from New York
- Ruth Webster Lathrop, physician, medical college professor in Philadelphia
- Dorothy Layne McIntyre, first African-American woman to receive a pilot's license from the Civil Aeronautics Authority
- Erin K. O'Shea, President of the Howard Hughes Medical Institute (HHMI) and Professor of Molecular and Cellular Biology and Chemistry and Chemical Biology at Harvard University
- Pearle Bixby Waite, native Le Roy man who invented the modern recipe for JELL-O. His wife is noted for coining the name. Jell-O 1-2-3.

== See also ==
- Marion Steam Shovel (Le Roy, New York)
