= George Lay =

George Lay may refer to:

- George W. Lay (1798–1860), U.S. Representative from New York
- George Tradescant Lay (died 1845), British naturalist, missionary and diplomat
