= William Farley =

William Farley may refer to:

- William Farley (director), American film director
- William Farley (Medal of Honor) (1835–?), Union Navy sailor and Medal of Honor recipient
- William F. Farley (born 1942), owner of private equity firm Farley Industries
- William Wallace Farley (1874–1952), New York Democratic state chairman
- Bill Farley (1944–2018), American swimming coach and swimmer
