= Batavia Cemetery =

Historic cemetery in New York, US

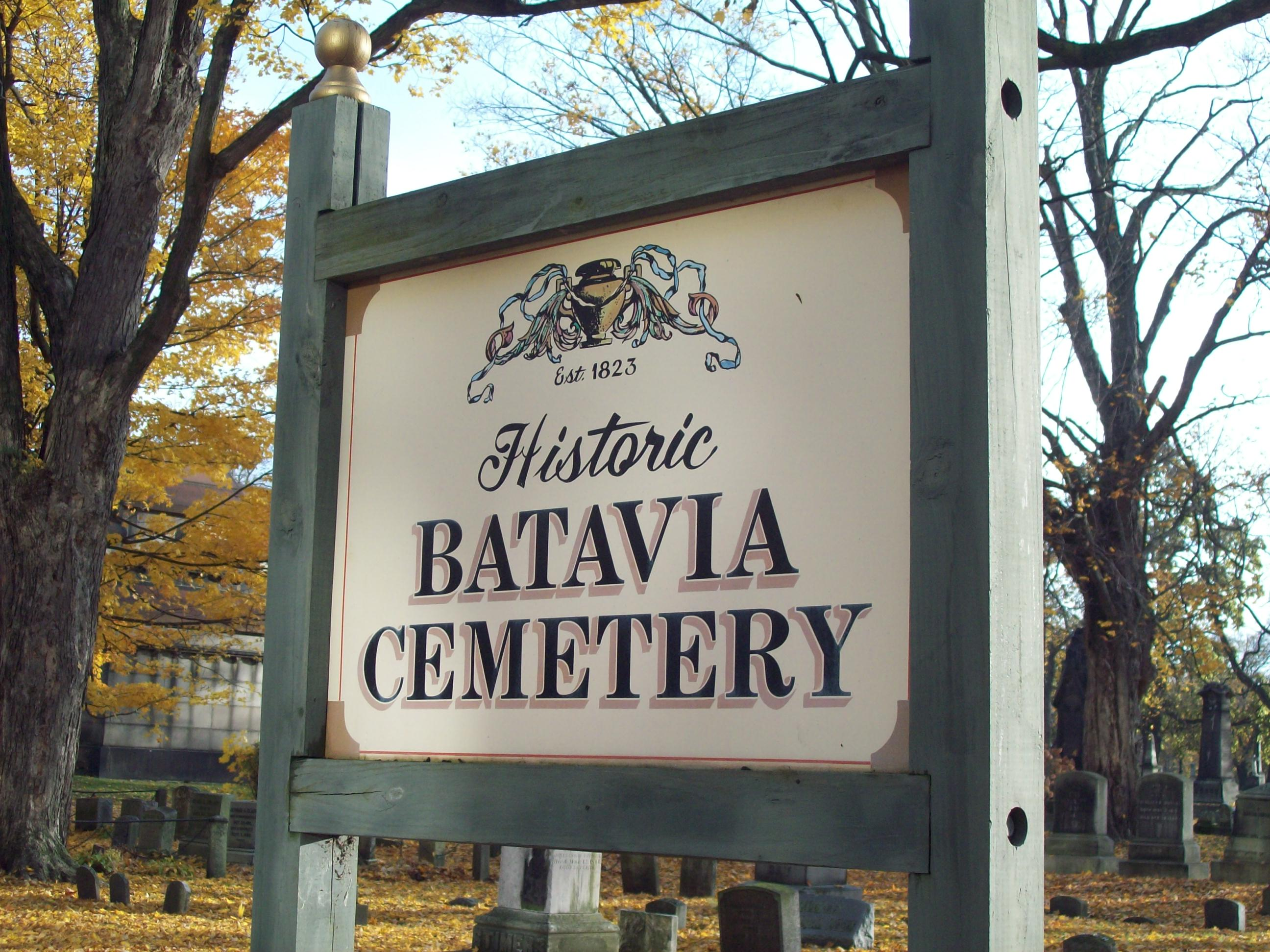
- Batavia Cemetery sign, 2009
- Interactive map of Batavia Cemetery

Details
- Established: 1823
- Location: Batavia, NY
- Country: US
- Coordinates: 42°59′36″N 78°10′17″W
- Owned by: Batavia Cemetery Association
- Size: 9 acres (3.6 ha)
- No. of graves: over 8,000
- Find a Grave: Batavia Cemetery
- The Political Graveyard: Batavia Cemetery

Batavia Cemetery is located on Harvester Avenue in Batavia, New York, United States. It opened in 1823 and contains over 8,000 graves, mostly from the 19th century. In 2002 it was listed on the National Register of Historic Places, the first of two cemeteries in Genesee County to be so designated.

The first graves were some of the city's early settlers, moved from another graveyard that had become too full. Originally it was run by nearby St. James Episcopal Church, but when the cemetery became too big an independent Batavia Cemetery Association was formed. It has operated the cemetery ever since.

Joseph Ellicott, the agent for the Holland Land Company, who shaped Western New York in its early years and laid out the cities of Batavia and Buffalo, is buried under a large monument. Other notable markers commemorate Anti-Masonic activist William Morgan, American Fourierist Albert Brisbane, and his son Arthur, a prominent newspaper editor in the yellow journalism era; Civil War General John H. Martindale and New York Central Railroad president Dean Richmond. Other notable burials include some local congressmen.

== Grounds ==
The cemetery is located on the east side of Harvester, a block south of East Main Street (New York state routes 5 and 33). It is an irregularly shaped 9-acre (3.6 ha) parcel bordered by an active rail spur on the south and an abandoned rail right-of-way on the north. The terrain is generally level with a small rise in the middle of the property. There are over 8,000 burials in 629 separate plots.

On the north is a residential neighborhood dominated by two-story wood frame houses from the 20th century. The portion of the right-of-way on the northwest is used as an unpaved parking area. Across Harvester is a large four-story brick industrial building. South of the railroad tracks is an area of mixed commercial and industrial use, with another large industrial complex served by the rail spur on the southeast.

A cast iron Italianate fence runs along the street side. It has simple spiked pickets between larger posts decorated with chamfered corners and floral rosettes. They are complemented by modern chainlink fences on the south and east; a row of Eastern Hemlock shrubs sets off the right-of-way at the northwest corner.

All vehicular access to the cemetery is via the double-leaf gates in the fence along Harvester. The main gate is in the center, with the cemetery's main internal access road leading due east from it to the rear corner. Secondary roads, most in the process of growing over, branch out from it at intervals.

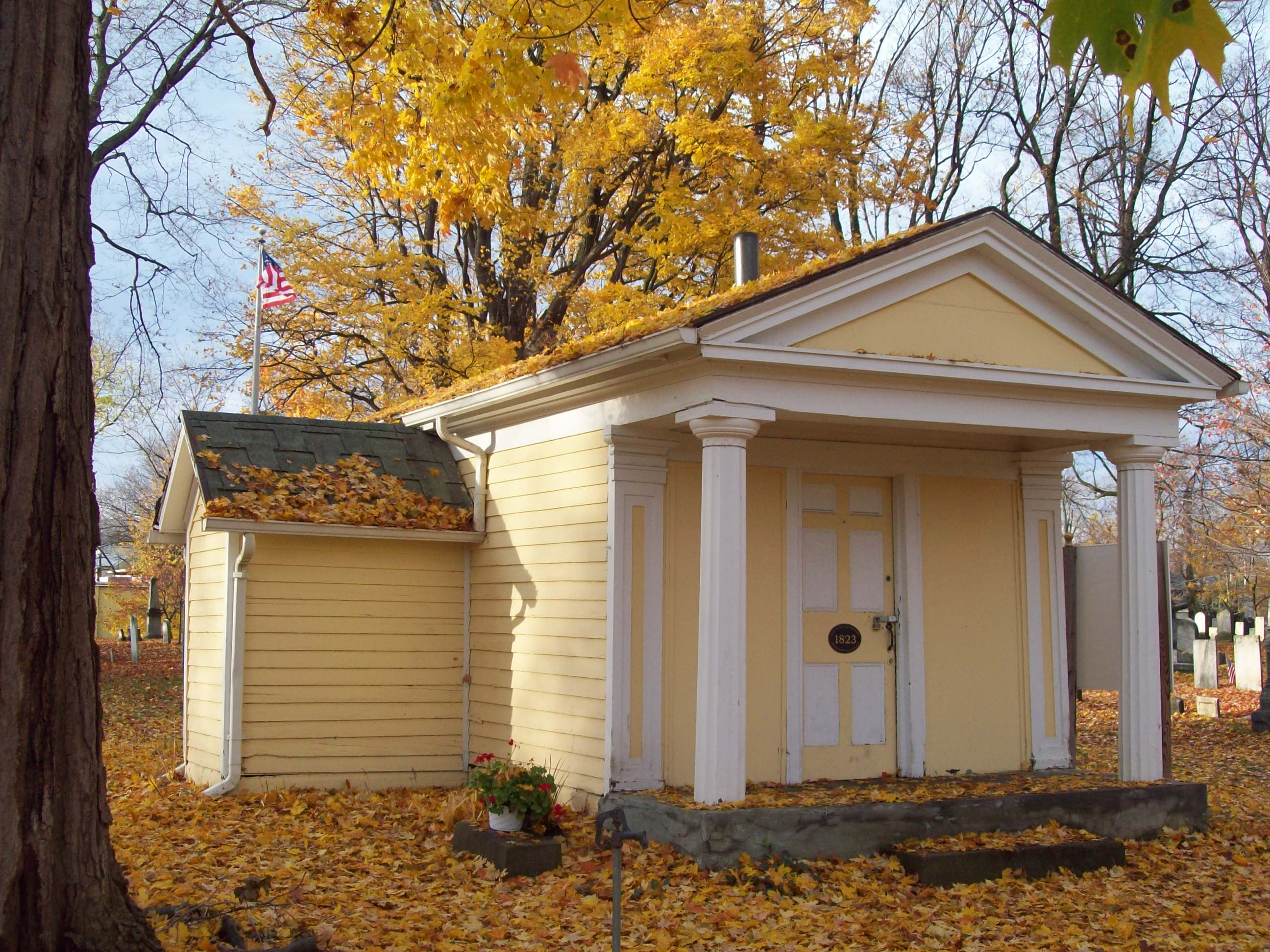
Maintenance shed

Along that road in the center of the cemetery is the only building, a small one-story one-bay maintenance shed, originally built as a bank and moved to the cemetery later. It is a Greek Revival structure with paired Doric columns and pilasters at the corners supporting a pedimented roof. The north (front) elevation is sided in clapboard; the others have flushboard. There is a small closet size wing on the east. A six-paneled wooden door in the middle of the front is the only entrance; there are no windows. It is considered a contributing property to the listing on the National Register.

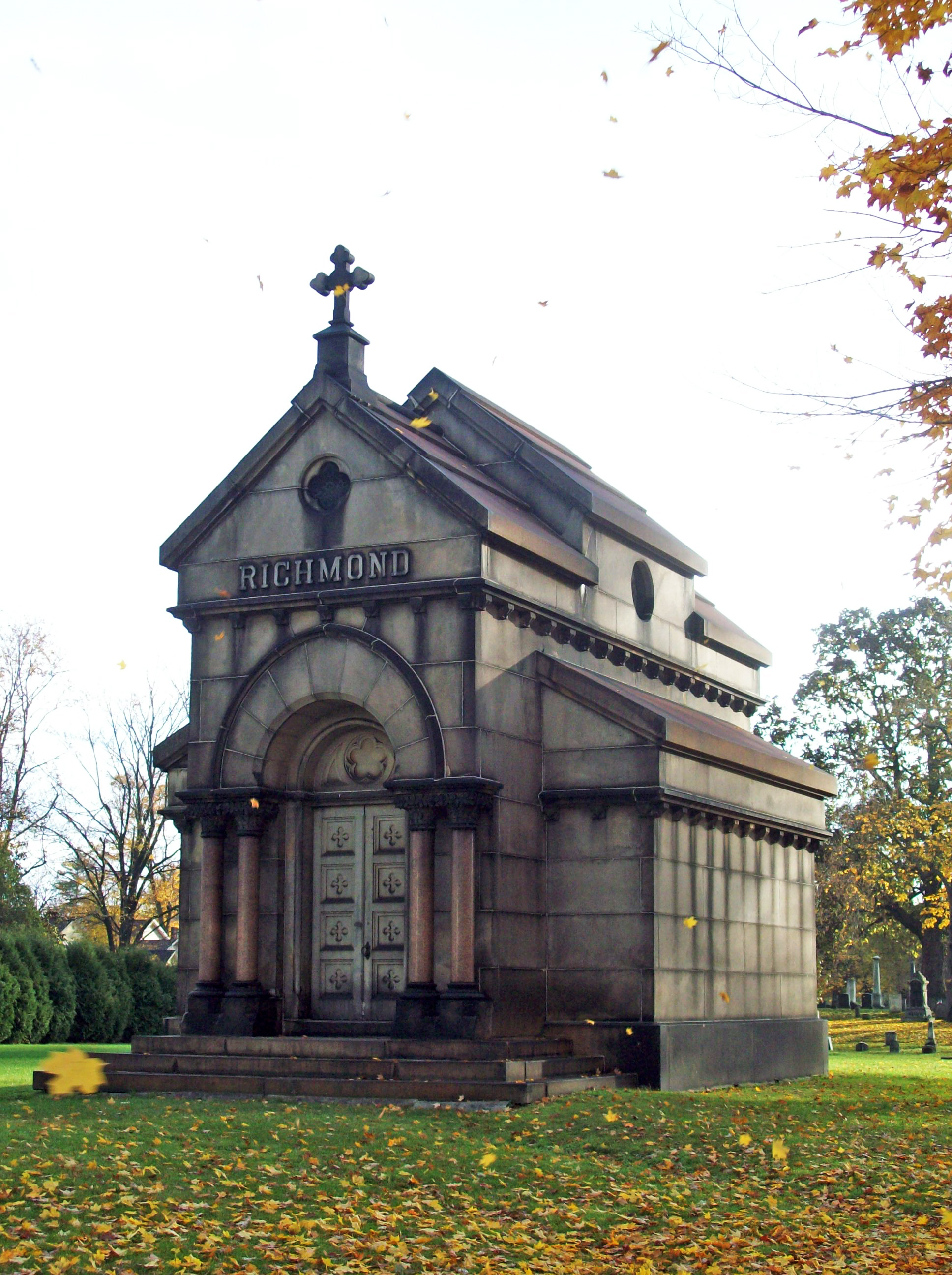
The Richmond Mausoleum

=== Richmond Mausoleum ===
A gate near the south end of the fence is no longer in use; the road from it is overgrown. Two gates near the northwest corner lead to a short semicircular drive with a large cast iron urn in the middle of its lawn. At its east end is the only mausoleum in the cemetery, the final resting place of Dean Richmond, a Batavia native who rose to become president of the New York Central Railroad. There are no other monuments or markers in the surrounding area.

It is a red granite High Victorian structure in the form of a high gableed nave with lower flanking shed-roofed catacombs topped by 28-by-7-foot (8.5 by 2.1 m), 13-short-ton (12 t) granite slabs. The middle section of the roof is raised further; its sides and the gable apexes have large quatrefoils.

A small set of steps on the west (front) end has a semicircular tympanum supported by four colonettes of smooth granite with carved cushioned capitals. Atop are voussoirs of alternating dark and light stone. A dentilled cornice runs around the perimeter above; on the west the name "Richmond" is carved just above it in the entablature. At the very top of the west facade is a stone cross.

=== Other monuments and markers ===
Two other decedents are commemorated with significant memorials, both in the form of tall pillars. Just southwest of the maintenance shed in the middle of the cemetery is a 32-foot (9.8 m) obelisk at the gravesite of Joseph Ellicott. An inscription recounts his accomplishments in developing the region as the agent for the Holland Land Company in the early decades of the 19th century.

At the southwest corner of the cemetery is a 37-foot (11 m) granite pillar with a statue of William Morgan atop it. A four-part inscription on all sides praises Morgan for his heroism in attempting to expose the secrets of Freemasonry and explains how the monument was funded with donations from Canada and 26 U.S. states and territories. Morgan is actually not buried there; he disappeared in 1824.

There are many other obelisks, many located in the south central portion near Ellicott's. Most are in a classical mode, with the Gothic cross on the grave of David Evans, Ellicott's nephew, a notable exception. The majority of the graves have markers typical of the 19th century, from simple marble headstones for the earlier graves to more Romantic markers later on with a wide variety of motifs in their funerary art. There are also polished granite markers from the early 20th century, and one of white zinc.

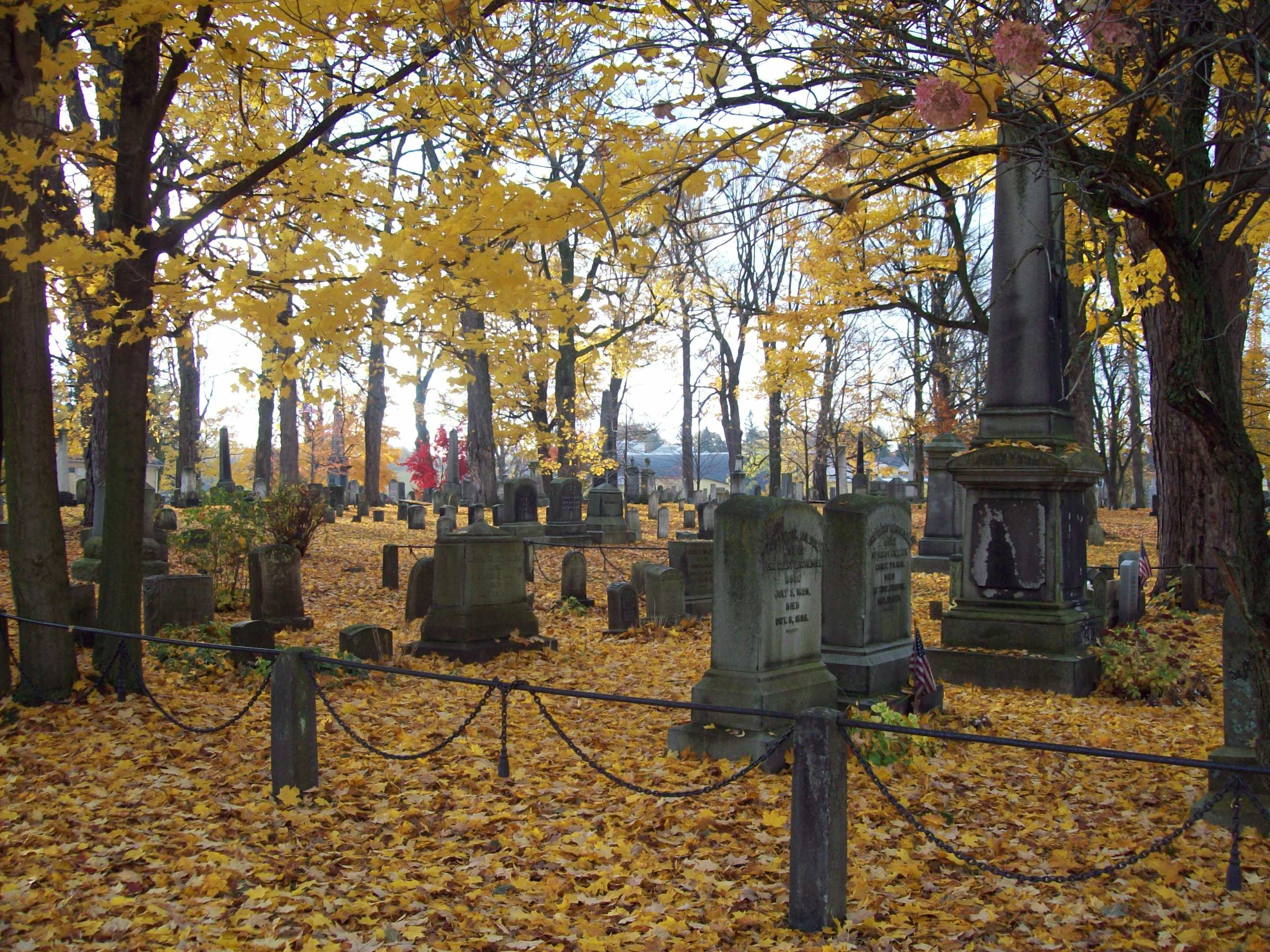
General view

== History ==
Batavia's first graveyard, the West Main Street Cemetery, was established in 1806, in the first years of settlement. Since it was next to Tonawanda Creek, which frequently flooded, it soon became apparent that a better location was needed. The decedents were removed to the new Batavia Cemetery, established in 1823 on what was the eastern edge of the village.

A former bank building was moved from Ebenezer, near Buffalo, to serve as the maintenance shed. The original 88 plots were laid out in a grid, with the feet of the dead intended to face east, toward the rising sun. Additional land was purchased in 1829 and 1841.

Eight years later, in 1849, the cemetery got its first large monument. Joseph Ellicott, a resident who as agent for the Holland Land Company had overseen and planned the settlement of what is now Western New York, had taken his own life in New York City in 1826 and was buried there. Almost a quarter-century after his death his sister Rachel Evans arranged for his body to be reburied in the city he had founded, with a large monument inscribed with an account of his life and work. More land was added to the cemetery three years later, in 1852.

The Ellicott monument was exceeded in scale after the Civil War by the mausoleum of Dean Richmond, who had parlayed his railroad holdings into the presidency of the New York Central Railroad from 1864 until his death two years later. His widow spent $28,000 ($677,000 in contemporary funds) having it built in 1869. It faced the line then used by the Central's main competitor, the Erie.

In the cemetery's early years, two churches, St. James Episcopal and the First Congregational Society (later the First Presbyterian Church) were the joint owners of the cemetery. Despite the land purchases and some other improvements, maintenance of the cemetery as a whole was unsatisfactory for the plot owners. They joined together in 1880 and incorporated as the Batavia Cemetery Association, which has owned and operated it ever since.

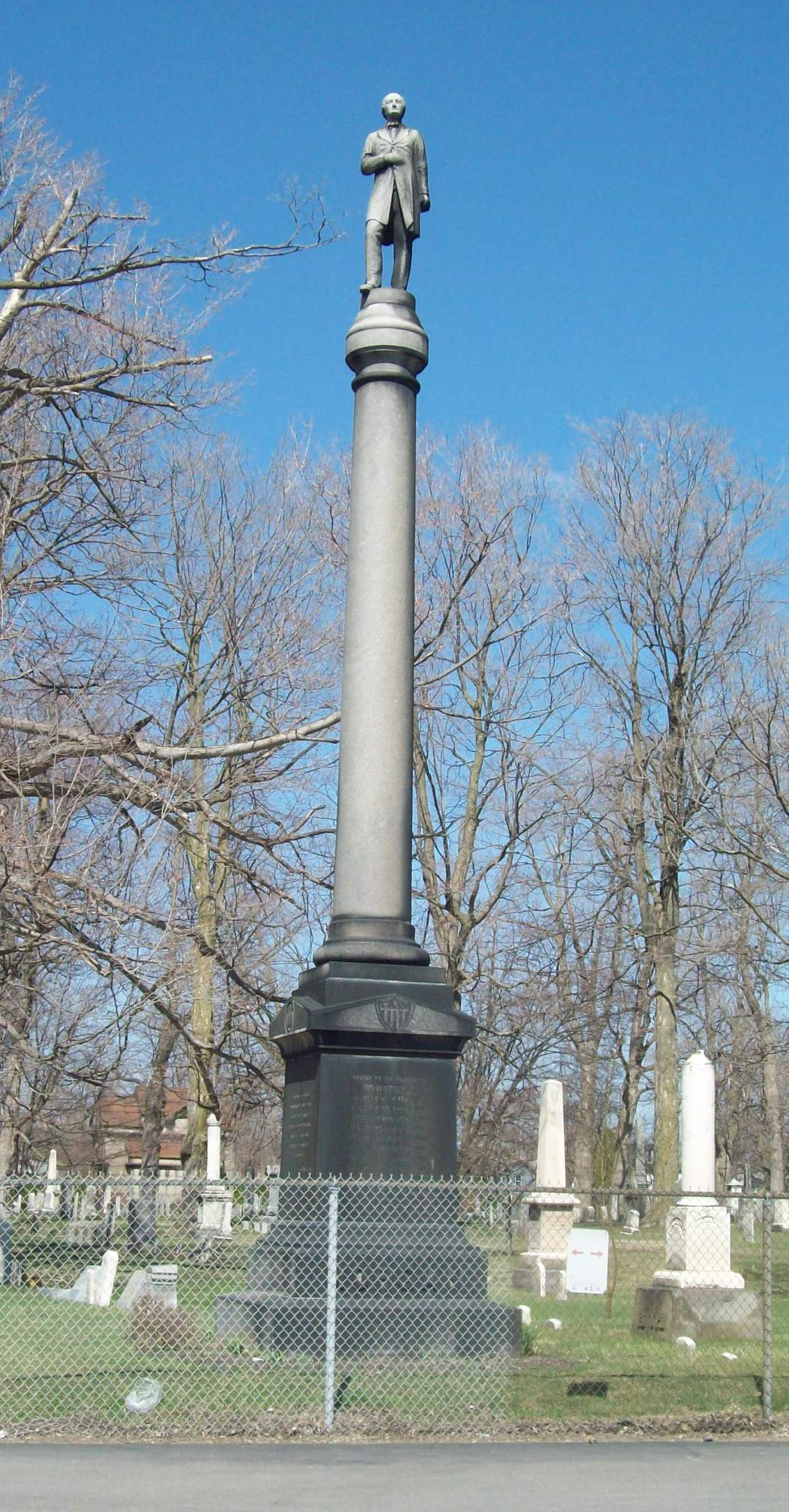
William Morgan Pillar

Two years later, in 1882, an organization called the National Christian Association Opposed to Secret Societies called attention to William Morgan, a Batavia resident who, after a failed bid to join the local Masonic Lodge, began speaking and writing against the order and its alleged hidden influence on society and politics. His 1826 disappearance, (Note: In 1881, workers at a quarry in nearby Pembroke found remains with artifacts that indicated they might be Morgan's.) supposedly after an abduction, helped catalyze the formation of an Anti-Masonic Party. The Association shared his sentiments, and proposed that a memorial be built to him. With $20,000 ($667,000 in contemporary funds) raised from supporters all over the United States and Canada, the monument was built in 1882. It was placed near the street and the New York Central main line to maximize its public visibility.

By that time, the Richmond mausoleum was beginning to show signs of structural failure. In 1886, Mrs. Richmond paid another $12,000 ($430,000 in contemporary funds) to have it dismantled, rebuilt and expanded. A total of 150 short tons (140 t) of granite were brought to Batavia from Westerly, Rhode Island, for the new mausoleum, including 10-inch-thick (250 mm) 6-by-10-foot (1.8 by 3.0 m) floor blocks.

The last significant land acquisition came in 1915, bringing the cemetery to its present shape and size. In the early 1950s the Central built a new main line south of the city, routing most rail traffic away from the Morgan monument. Both those tracks and the Erie's eventually became part of Conrail when the private railroads failed in the early 1970s; the former Erie tracks were removed. In 1998 one of the neighboring companies, which owns the right-of-way, transferred a stretch near the cemetery's northeast corner to it for future expansion.

== Notable burials ==
Decedents of note buried at Batavia include seven members of the U.S. House of Representatives, some of whom also served in the New York State Legislature, a Civil War general, a railroad executive, and the man who guided the region's early development.

- John T. Bergen, (1786–1855). U.S. Representative from Brooklyn, 1831–33.
- Albert Brisbane, (1809–1890). Early popularizer of the utopian socialist ideas of French philosopher Charles Fourier reflected in Brook Farm and several other experimental communities of the 1840s.
- Arthur Brisbane, (1863–1936). Son of Albert who became one of the most influential American newspaper editors of the late 19th and early 20th centuries under William Randolph Hearst, along with whom he is credited with creating yellow journalism.
- Benjamin Ellicott, (1765–1827). Brother of Joseph Ellicott and a U.S. representative for the area from 1817–19.
- David Ellicott Evans, (1788–1850). A former clerk for the Holland Land Company at its office in Batavia run by his uncle Joseph, he later became a state senator and served for two months as a U.S. representative before he succeeded his uncle as land agent through the company's dissolution in 1837.
- Joseph Ellicott, (1760–1826). As surveyor, land agent and highest-ranking representative for the Holland Land Company, he was effectively Western New York's regional planner for the first quarter-century of its settlement. He laid out the cities of Buffalo and Batavia, lobbied for the construction of the Erie Canal and served as a judge. His large obelisk near the center of the cemetery was built by his sister Rachel Evans when she had him reburied here in 1849.
- John Fisher, (1806–1882). A New Hampshire native who settled in Canada and established the first foundry in Hamilton, Ontario. After returning to the United States and settling in Batavia he served as a U.S. Representative for the 1869–71 term.
- George W. Lay, (1798–1860). Served as a U.S. Representative from 1833–37, a state assemblyman in 1840 and as chargé d'affaires at the U.S. embassy in Sweden from 1842–45.
- John Henry Martindale, (1815–1881). A graduate of the United States Military Academy, he later became a lawyer and served as Genesee County district attorney. At the outbreak of the Civil War he returned to the Army and was commissioned a brigadier general. After the Peninsula Campaign, he supervised the defenses of Washington as military governor, was brevetted to major general and led troops at Bermuda Hundred, Cold Harbor and Petersburg. After the war he was elected to a term as New York State Attorney General.
- William Morgan, (1774–1826). A resident of Batavia, New York, whose murder in 1826 ignited the Anti-masonry movement and the creation of the Anti-Masonic Party.
- Benjamin Pringle, (1807–1887). A Genesee County Court judge who was later elected to two successive terms as a U.S. Representative from 1853–57, as a Whig for the first and an Oppositionist the second. During the war he served briefly in the state assembly, and Lincoln appointed him to the court of arbitration in Cape Town, South Africa, as part of the treaty with Britain on the abolition of the African slave trade.
- Dean Richmond, (1804–1866). After taking over his family's salt business in his teens, he eventually got into railroads, helping persuade the state legislature to clear the way for the creation of the Central and its free competition with the Erie Canal. At the time of his death he was president of the Central. His widow had his elaborate stone 1869 mausoleum at the northwest corner of the cemetery rebuilt and expanded in 1882.
- Phineas L. Tracy, (1786–1876). Elected to succeed David Evans as U.S. Representative in 1827, he served through 1833, often taking Anti-Masonic positions. After leaving Congress he served as a presiding judge at county court.

== See also ==
- National Register of Historic Places listings in Genesee County, New York
