= New York State Democratic Party =

New York affiliate of the Democratic Party

- Chairperson: Jay Jacobs
- Governor of New York: Kathy Hochul
- Lieutenant Governor of New York: Antonio Delgado
- Senate Majority Leader: Andrea Stewart-Cousins
- Assembly Speaker: Carl Heastie
- Leader on the New York City Council: Shaun Abreu
- Founded: 1829; 197 years ago
- Headquarters: 64 Beaver St; New York City, NY 10004
- Student wing: College Democrats of New York
- Youth wing: New York State Young Democrats
- Membership (2026): ▲6,002,006
- Ideology: Progressivism; Social liberalism Faction: Democratic socialism
- Political position: Center-left to left-wing
- National affiliation: Democratic Party
- Colors: Blue
- New York State Assembly: 103 / 150
- New York State Senate: 41 / 63
- Statewide Executive Offices: 4 / 4
- New York City Council: 46 / 51
- United States House of Representatives (New York): 19 / 26
- United States Senate (New York): 2 / 2

Election symbol

Website
- nydems.org

The New York State Democratic Party is the affiliate of the Democratic Party in the U.S. state of New York. Its headquarters are in New York City, and it has an office in Albany, New York.

It is currently the dominant party in the state, controlling the majority of New York's United States House of Representatives seats, both United States Senate seats, both houses of the New York State Legislature, and the Governor of New York.

== History ==
The three Democratic presidents who were from New York are Franklin D. Roosevelt (32nd) who was the governor of New York from 1929 to 1932, Grover Cleveland (22nd and 24th) who was the governor from 1883 to 1885, and Martin Van Buren (eighth) who was the governor in 1829. Van Buren is also the only Democratic vice president who was from New York.

In the early 20th century when New York was without a Democratic governor, county leaders controlled nominations and campaign finances. President John F. Kennedy got involved in the early 1960s, funneling federal patronage through New York City mayor Robert F. Wagner Jr. to the detriment of state chair Michael H. Prendergast.

In 1974, Democrats benefited from Republican problems stemming from the Watergate scandal, winning control of the New York State Assembly and electing a governor, Hugh Carey. Democrats have controlled the Assembly ever since. Republicans controlled the State Senate for some years after that, but Democrats gained a decisive advantage in the chamber in 2018 and 2020.

In August 2021, Jay Jacobs of the committee was the one to tell Andrew Cuomo to resign as New York governor over reports of sexual harassment, then supported Cuomo's successor Kathy Hochul. As of 2022, the NY Democratic Party was described as having "dominance" in New York politics, as it largely controlled political positions in Albany, and Republicans had not won statewide since 2002. As of August 2022 the chair of the committee was Jay S. Jacobs. He was reelected chairman in September 2022. The Executive Committee is chaired by former New York City Council Speaker Christine Quinn. The Executive Director is Alexander Wang.

== Current elected officials ==
The following is a list of elected statewide and federal Democratic officeholders:

=== Members of Congress ===
Democrats hold 19 of New York's 26 seats in the U.S. House of Representatives and both of New York's seats in the U.S. Senate.

==== U.S. Senate ====
Democrats have controlled both of New York's seats in the U.S. Senate since 1998:

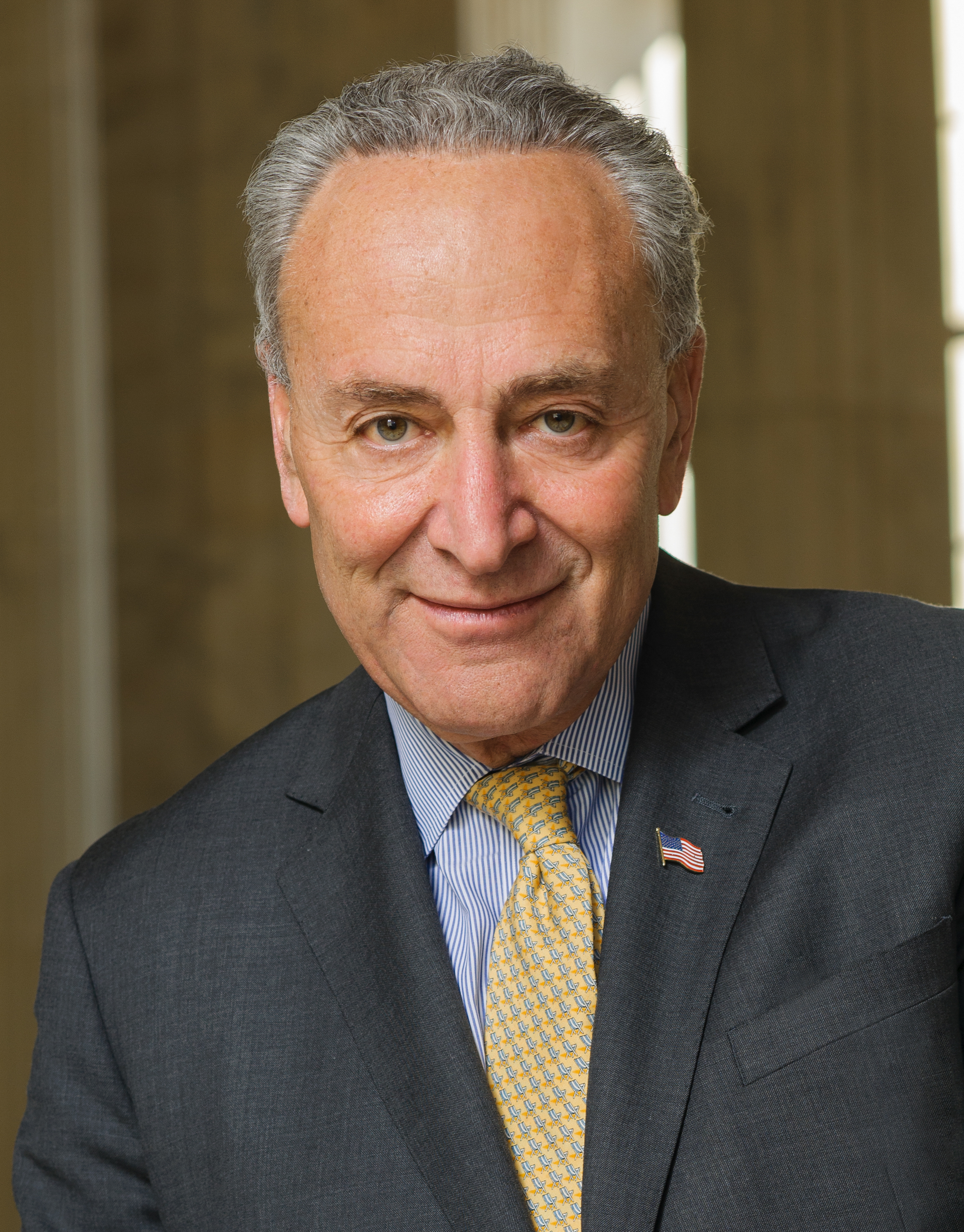
Senior U.S. Senator Chuck Schumer
(Minority Leader)

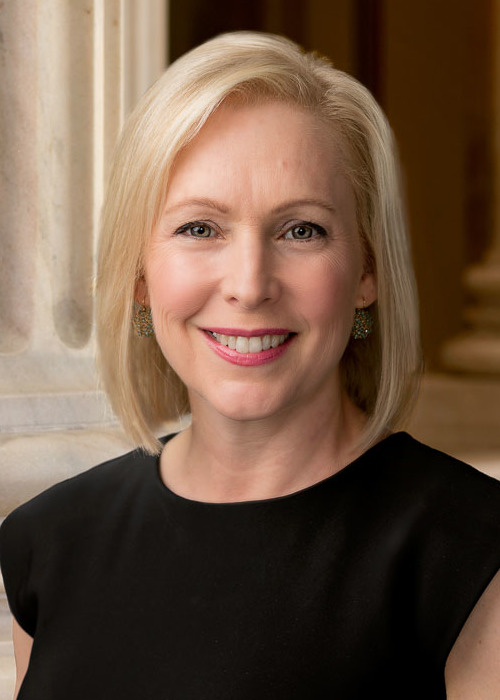
Junior U.S. Senator Kirsten Gillibrand

==== U.S. House of Representatives ====
| District | Member | Photo |
|---|---|---|
| 3rd | Tom Suozzi | |
| 4th | Laura Gillen | |
| 5th | Gregory Meeks | |
| 6th | Grace Meng | |
| 7th | Nydia Velázquez | |
| 7th | Claire Valdez (elect) | |
| 8th | Hakeem Jeffries (Speaker (designate)) | |
| 9th | Yvette Clarke | |
| 10th | Dan Goldman | |
| 10th | Brad Lander (elect) | |
| 12th | Jerry Nadler | |
| 12th | Micah Lasher (elect) | |
| 13th | Adriano Espaillat | |
| 13th | Darializa Avila Chevalier (elect) | |
| 14th | Alexandria Ocasio-Cortez | |
| 15th | Ritchie Torres | |
| 16th | George Latimer | |
| 17th | Cait Conley (elect) | |
| 18th | Pat Ryan | |
| 19th | Josh Riley | |
| 20th | Paul Tonko | |
| 22nd | John Mannion | |
| 25th | Joseph Morelle | |
| 26th | Tim Kennedy | |

=== Statewide officials ===
NYS Democrats control all four of the elected statewide offices and NYS Cabinet and Departmental Head positions (e.g., New York State Department of Health, NYS Secretary of State, NYS Department of Corrections, New York State Office of People with Intellectual and Developmental Disabilities, NYS Department of Environmental Conservation, NYS Office of General Services, NYS Department of Education) and the Governor's Office.

Governor Kathy Hochul

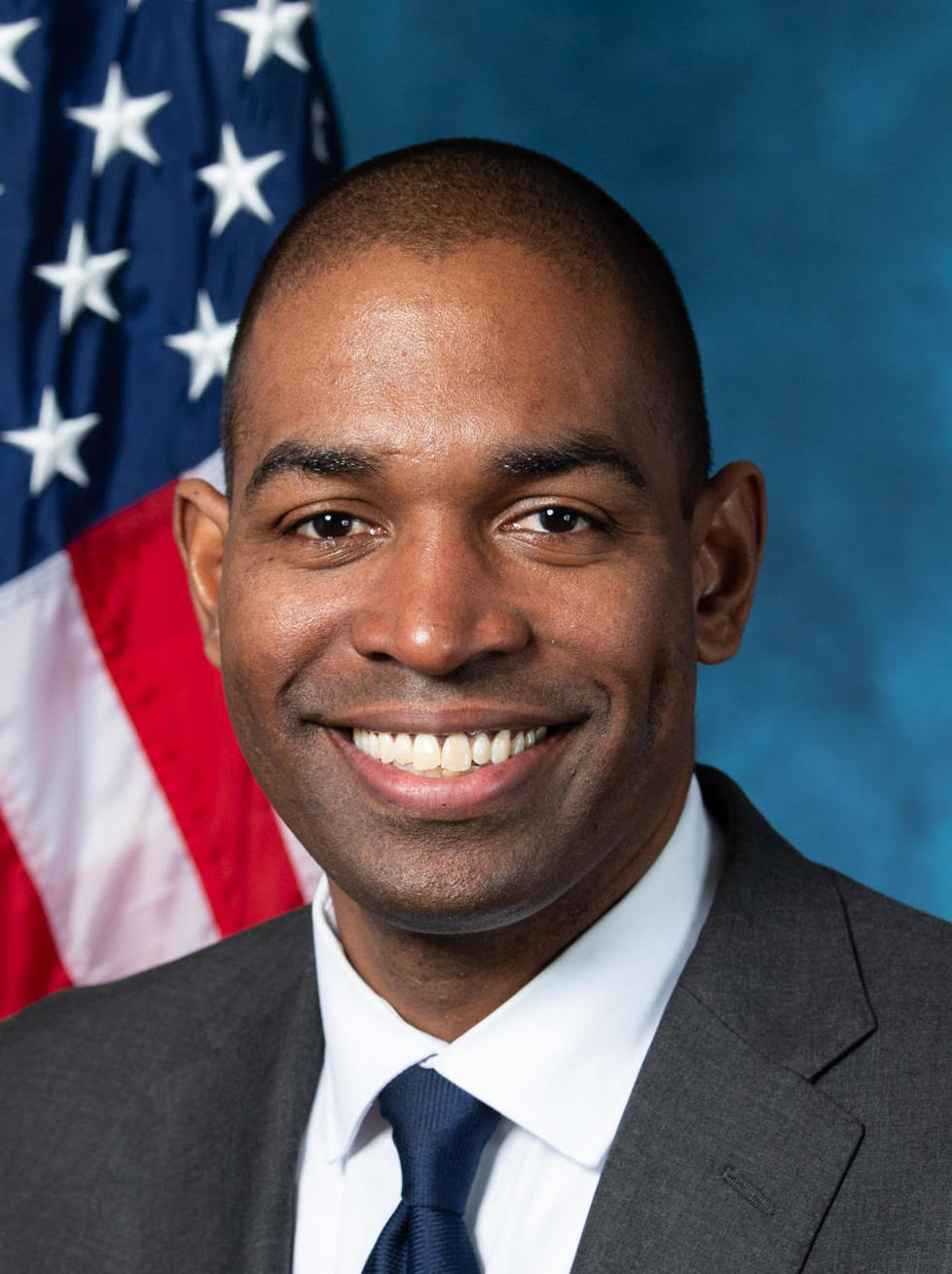
Lieutenant Governor Antonio Delgado

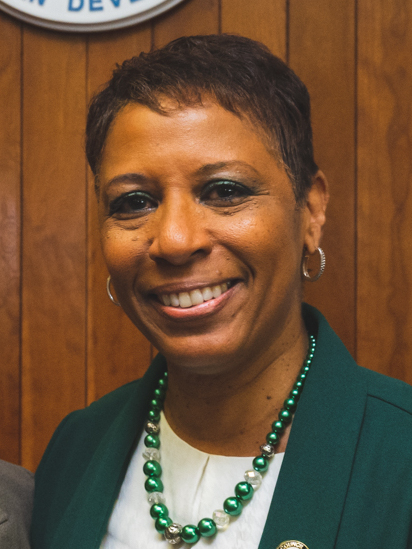
Lieutenant Governor-elect Adrienne Adams

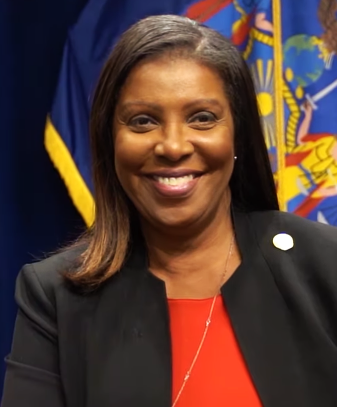
Attorney General Letitia James

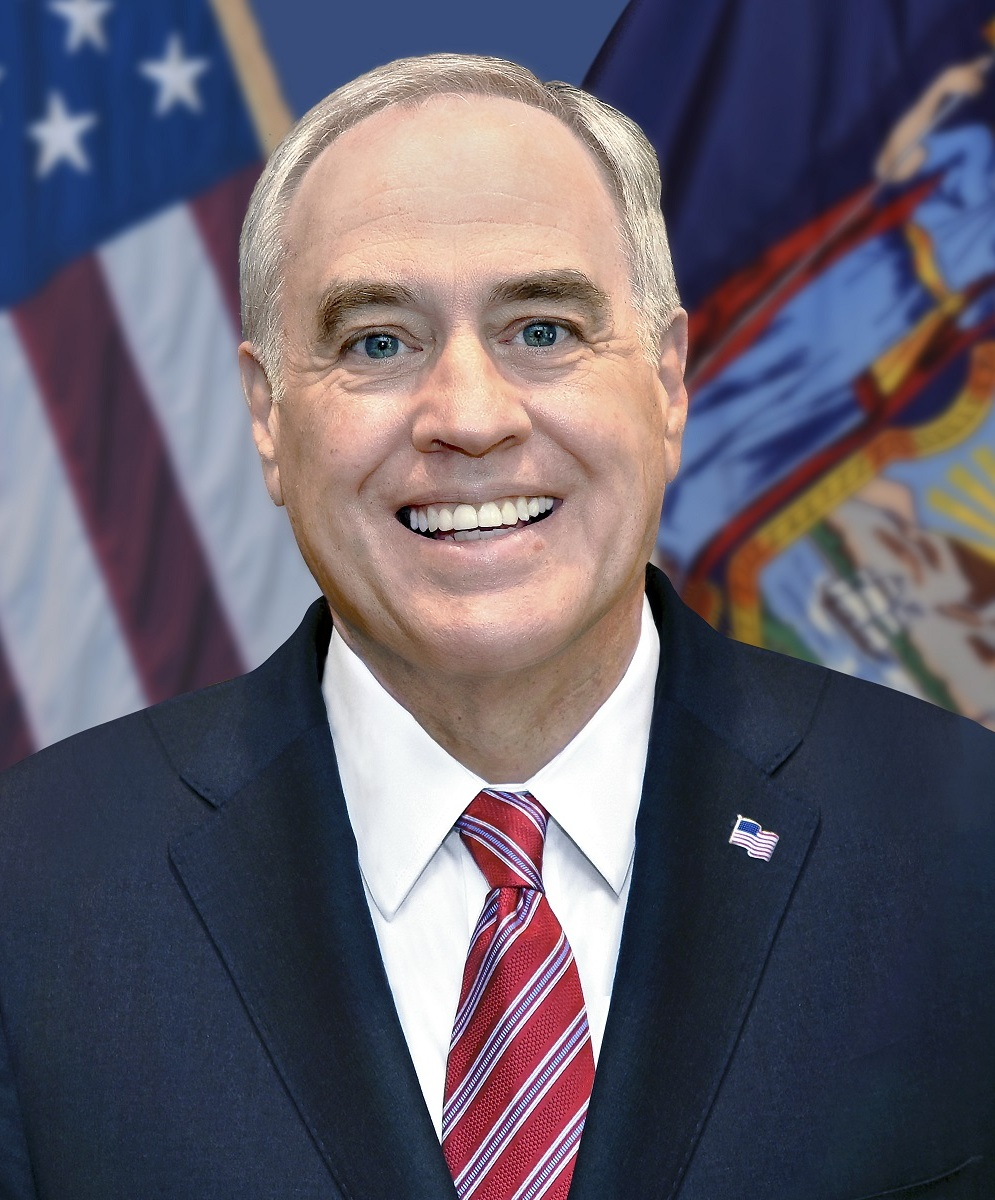
Comptroller Thomas DiNapoli

=== State legislative leaders ===
- Temporary President/Majority Leader of the Senate: Andrea Stewart-Cousins
- Deputy Senate Majority Leader: Vacant
- Vice Senate President Pro Tempore: Neil Breslin
- Senior Senate Assistant Majority Leader: Antonio Delegado
- Chair of Majority Program Development Committee: Tim Kennedy
- Chair of the Majority Conference: Jose Serrano
- Senate Assistant Majority Leader on Conference Operations: Brad Hoylman
- Senate Assistant Majority Leader on House Operations: Gustavo Rivera
- Senate Majority Whip: Kevin Parker
- Senate Majority Conference Vice-Chair: Toby Ann Stavisky
- Senate Majority Conference Secretary: Velmanette Montgomery
- Senate Majority Deputy Whip: Joseph Addabbo Jr.
- Senate Majority Assistant Whip: John Liu
- Chair of the Senate Majority Steering Committee: Roxanne Persaud
- Senate Liaison to the Executive Branch: Todd Kaminsky
- Deputy Senate Majority Leader for State/Federal Relations: Leroy Comrie
- Deputy Senate Majority Leader for Senate/Assembly Relations: Shelley Mayer
- Assistant Senate Majority Leader on Intergovernmental Affairs: Monica Martinez
- Speaker of the Assembly: Carl Heastie
- Speaker Pro Tempore of the Assembly: Pamela Hunter
- House Majority Leader: Crystal Peoples-Stokes

=== Mayoral offices ===
As of October 2026, Democrats control the mayor's offices in nine of New York's ten largest cities:

- New York City (1): Zohran Mamdani
- Buffalo (2): Sean Ryan
- Yonkers (3): Mike Spano
- Rochester (4): Malik Evans
- Syracuse (5): Sharon Owens
- Albany (6): Dorcey Applyrs
- New Rochelle (7): Yadira Ramos-Herbert
- Mount Vernon (8): Shawyn Patterson Howard
- Schenectady (9): Gary McCarthy

== List of chairpersons ==
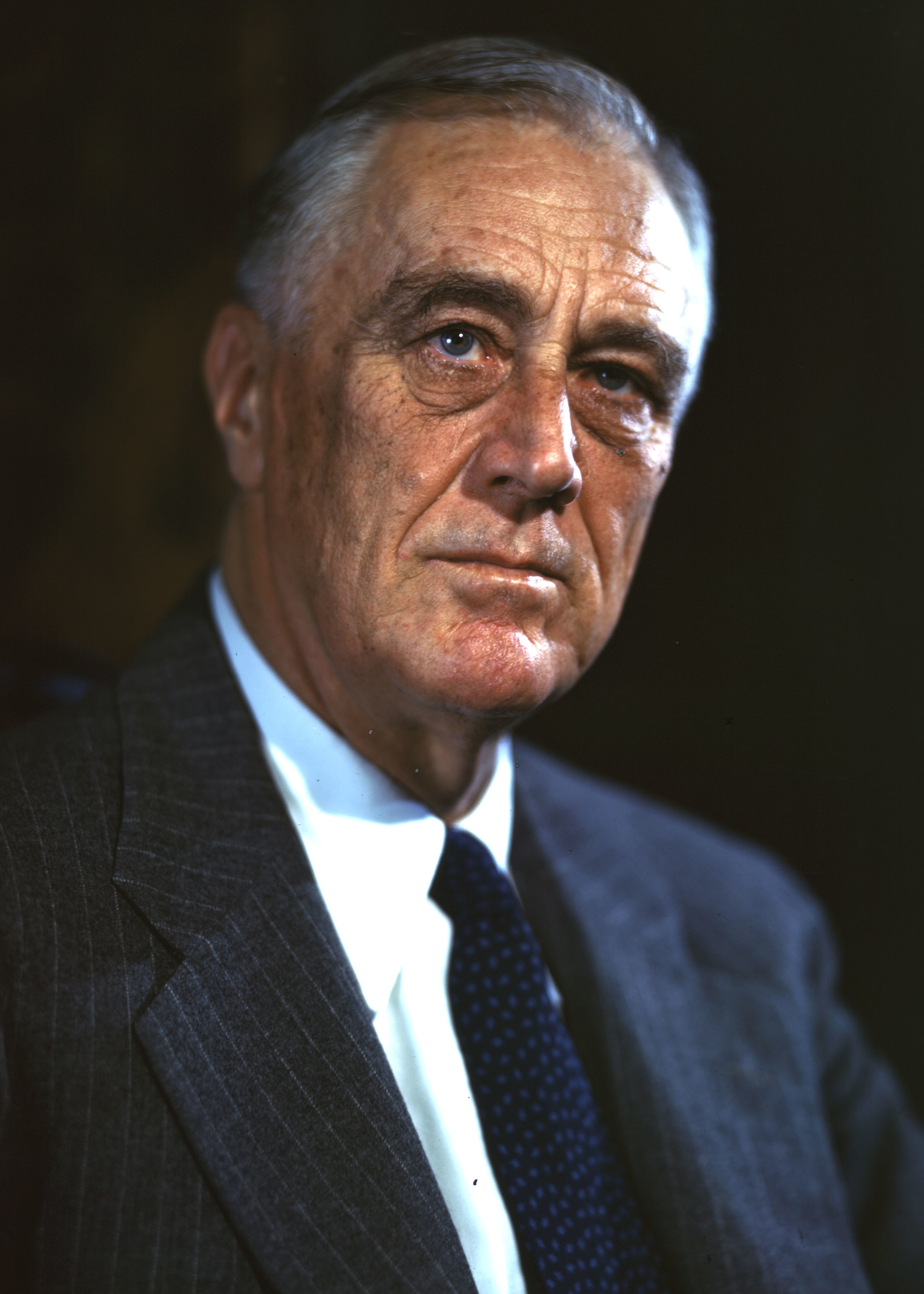
President Franklin D. Roosevelt (1933–1945)

President Grover Cleveland (1885–1889; 1893–1897)

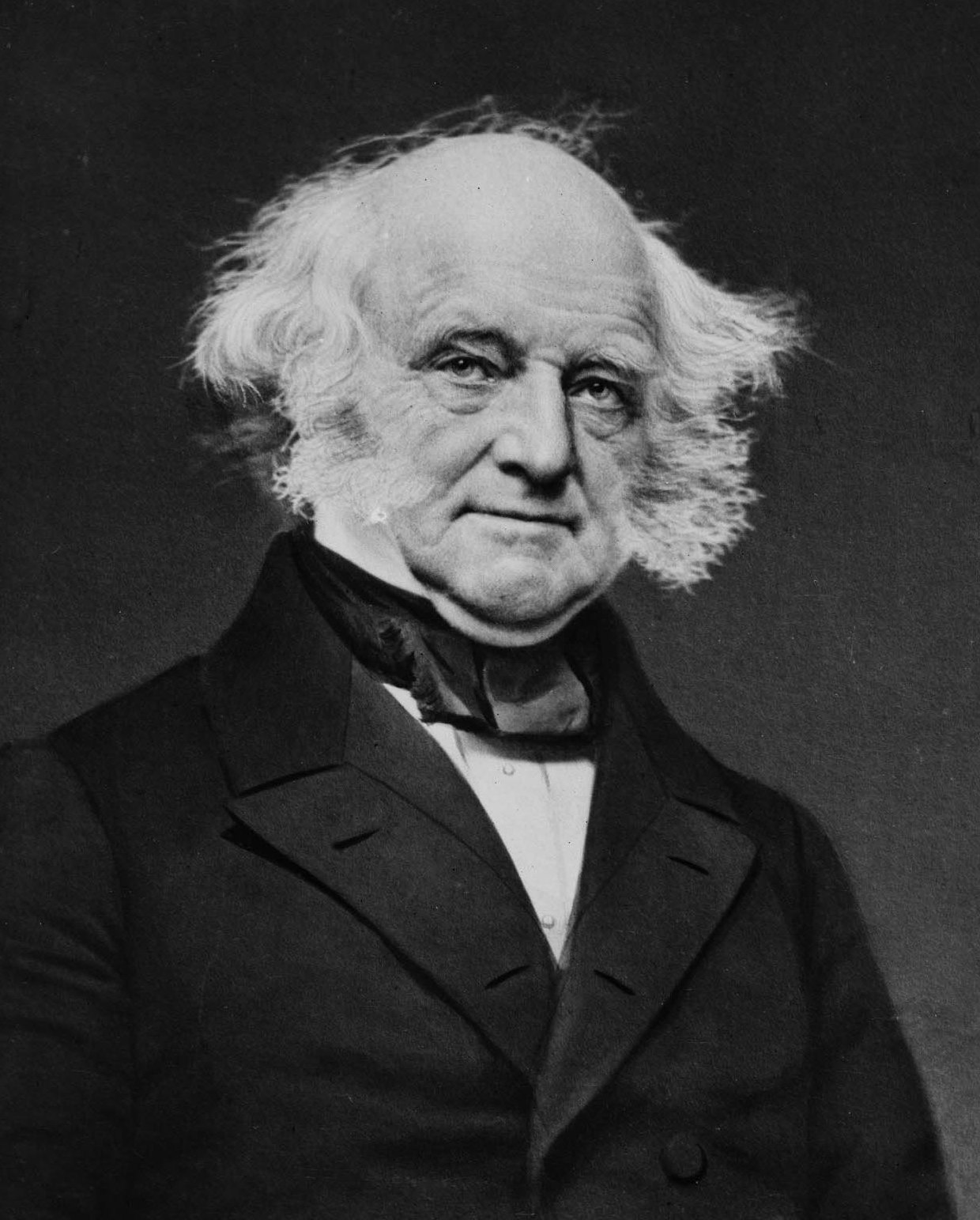
President Martin Van Buren (1837–1841)

Chairpersons
| Chair | Tenure | Hometown while serving |
|---|---|---|
| Augustus Schell | January 1852 – August 1856 | Manhattan |
| Samuel Fowler | June 1856 – August 1856 | Port Jervis |
| Dean Richmond | August 1856 – August 1866 | Batavia |
| Samuel J. Tilden | August 1866 – September 1874 | Manhattan |
| Allen C. Beach | September 1874 – September 1875 | Watertown |
| Daniel Magone | September 1875 – October 1877 | Ogdensburg |
| William Purcell | October 1877 – September 1879 | Rochester |
| Lester B. Faulkner | September 1879 – October 1881 | Dansville |
| Daniel Manning | October 1881 – August 1885 | Albany |
| John O'Brien | September 1885 – September 1886 | Rhinebeck |
| Charles C. B. Walker | September 1886 – January 1888 | Corning |
| Edward Murphy Jr. | May 1888 – September 1894 | Troy |
| James W. Hinckley | September 1894 – September 1896 | Poughkeepsie |
| Elliott Danforth | September 1896 – September 1898 | Manhattan |
| Frank Campbell | September 1898 – April 1904 | Bath |
| Cord Meyer | April 1904 – October 1906 | Queens |
| William J. Conners | October 1906 – June 1910 | Buffalo |
| John Alden Dix | June 1910 – October 1910 | Thomson |
| Winfield A. Huppuch | October 1910 – October 1911 | Hudson Falls |
| Norman E. Mack | October 1911 – February 1912 | Buffalo |
| George M. Palmer | February 1912 – March 1914 | Cobleskill |
| William Church Osborn | March 1914 – April 1916 | Garrison |
| Edwin S. Harris | April 1916 – September 1918 | Schuylerville |
| Joseph A. Kellogg | October 1918 – December 1918 | Glens Falls |
| William W. Farley | January 1919 – June 1921 | Binghamton |
| Herbert C. Pell | July 1921 – January 1926 | Tuxedo Park |
| Edwin Corning | January 1926 – August 1928 | Albany |
| M. William Bray | August 1928 – September 1930 | Utica |
| James A. Farley | October 1930 – June 1944 | Manhattan |
| Paul E. Fitzpatrick | July 1944 – December 1, 1952 | Buffalo |
| Walter A. Lynch | 1952 (Acting) | Bronx |
| Richard H. Balch | December 1952 – June 1955 | Utica |
| Michael H. Prendergast | July 1955 – February 28, 1962 | Haverstraw |
| William H. McKeon | March 1, 1962 - July 1965 | Auburn |
| John J. Burns | July 1965 – December 1971 | Binghamton |
| Joseph F. Crangle | December 1971 – December 1974 | Buffalo |
| Patrick J. Cunningham | December 1974 – January 31, 1977 | Bronx |
| Dominic J. Baranello | February 1, 1977 – December 1982 | Blue Point |
| William C. Hennessy | December 1982 – December 1984 | Albany |
| Laurence J. Kirwan | December 1984 – May 1989 | Rochester |
| John A. Marino | May 1989 – May 1993 | Manhattan |
| Alfred Gordon | May 1993 – March 1995 | Queens |
| Judith H. Hope and John T. Sullivan | March 1995 – April 1998 | East Hampton and Oswego |
| Judith Hope | April 1998 – December 2001 | East Hampton |
| Herman D. Farrell Jr. | December 2001 – December 31, 2006 | Manhattan |
| June O'Neill and Dave Pollak | December 2006 – April 2008 (Pollak) December 2006 – September 2009 (O'Neill) | Watertown and New York |
| Jay S. Jacobs | September 2009 – June 2012 | Laurel Hollow |
| Keith L. T. Wright and Stephanie Miner | June 2012 – April 2014 | Manhattan and Syracuse |
| Keith L. T. Wright | April 2014 – May 2014 | Manhattan |
| David Paterson | May 2014 – November 2015 | Harlem |
| Sheila Comar | November 2015 – June 2016 | Washington |
| Byron Brown | June 2016 – January 2019 | Buffalo |
| Jay S. Jacobs | January 2019 – present | Laurel Hollow |

=== Executive Committee Chair, Christine Quinn ===
Christine Callaghan Quinn (born July 25, 1966) is an American politician. A member of the Democratic Party, she formerly served as the Speaker of the New York City Council. The third person to hold this office, she is the first female and first openly gay speaker.^{[3][4]} As City Council speaker, Quinn was New York City's third most powerful public servant, behind the mayor and public advocate. She ran to succeed Michael Bloomberg as the city's mayor in the 2013 mayoral election, but she came in third in the Democratic primary.

== Election results ==
=== Federal ===
==== U.S. House ====
| Election | Votes | % | Seats (NY) | ± | % |
|---|---|---|---|---|---|
| 2016 | 4,456,967 | 62.81 | 18 / 27 | 0 | 7.68 |
| 2018 | 3,990,483 | 67.16 | 21 / 27 | ▲3 | 4.35 |
| 2020 | 5,084,863 | 61.96 | 19 / 27 | ▼2 | 5.20 |
| 2022 | 3,199,496 | 55.59 | 15 / 26 | ▼3 | 6.40 |
| 2024 | 4,527,087 | 57.21 | 19 / 26 | ▲3 | 1.62 |
| 2026 | 3,712,993 | 61.79 | 20 / 26 | ▲1 | 4.58 |

=== State ===
==== Executive offices ====
Governor
| Election | Candidate | Votes | % | Result |
|---|---|---|---|---|
| 1938 | Herbert H. Lehman | 2,391,286 | 49.59% | Won ✓ |
| 1942 | John J. Bennett Jr. | 1,501,039 | 36.40% | Lost ✗ |
| 1946 | James M. Mead | 2,138,482 | 43.08% | Lost ✗ |
| 1950 | Walter A. Lynch | 2,246,855 | 42.32% | Lost ✗ |
| 1954 | W. Averell Harriman/George DeLuca | 2,560,738 | 49.61% | Won ✓ |
| 1958 | W. Averell Harriman/George DeLuca | 2,553,895 | 44.71% | Lost ✗ |
| 1962 | Robert Morgenthau/John J. Burns | 2,552,418 | 43.96% | Lost ✗ |
| 1966 | Frank D. O'Connor/Howard J. Samuels | 2,298,363 | 38.11% | Lost ✗ |
| 1970 | Arthur Goldberg/Basil Paterson | 2,421,426 | 40.27% | Lost ✗ |
| 1974 | Hugh Carey/Mary Anne Krupsak | 3,028,503 | 57.22% | Won ✓ |
| 1978 | Hugh Carey/Mario Cuomo | 2,429,272 | 50.95% | Won ✓ |
| 1982 | Mario Cuomo/Alfred DelBello | 2,675,213 | 50.91% | Won ✓ |
| 1986 | Mario Cuomo/Stan Lundine | 2,775,045 | 64.63% | Won ✓ |
| 1990 | Mario Cuomo/Stan Lundine | 2,157,087 | 53.17% | Won ✓ |
| 1994 | Mario Cuomo/Stan Lundine | 2,364,904 | 45.45% | Lost ✗ |
| 1998 | Peter Vallone Sr./Sandra Frankel | 1,570,317 | 33.16% | Lost ✗ |
| 2002 | H. Carl McCall/Dennis Mehiel | 1,534,064 | 33.19% | Lost ✗ |
| 2006 | Eliot Spitzer/David Paterson | 3,086,709 | 69.56% | Won ✓ |
| 2010 | Andrew Cuomo/Robert Duffy | 2,910,876 | 62.49% | Won ✓ |
| 2014 | Andrew Cuomo/Kathy Hochul | 2,069,480 | 54.19% | Won ✓ |
| 2018 | Andrew Cuomo/Kathy Hochul | 3,635,340 | 59.55% | Won ✓ |
| 2022 | Kathy Hochul/Antonio Delgado | 3,140,415 | 53.12% | Won ✓ |
| 2026 | Kathy Hochul/Adrienne Adams | 3,641,811 | 59.7% | Won ✓ |

Attorney General
| Year | Candidate | Votes | % | Result |
|---|---|---|---|---|
| 2014 | Eric Schneiderman | 2,069,956 | 55.71% | Won ✓ |
| 2018 | Letitia James | 3,739,239 | 62.39% | Won ✓ |
| 2022 | Letitia James | 3,168,256 | 54.60% | Won ✓ |
| 2026 | Letitia James | 3,639,140 | 60.1% | Won ✓ |

Comptroller
| Year | Candidate | Votes | % | Result |
|---|---|---|---|---|
| 2014 | Thomas DiNapoli | 2,233,057 | 60.14% | Won ✓ |
| 2018 | Thomas DiNapoli | 4,027,886 | 56.94% | Won ✓ |
| 2022 | Thomas DiNapoli | 3,305,112 | 57.27% | Won ✓ |
| 2026 | Thomas DiNapoli | 3,863,630 | 64.5% | Won ✓ |

== See also ==
- Independent Democratic Conference
- New York Republican State Committee
