= Anthony J. Griffin =

American politician (1866–1935)

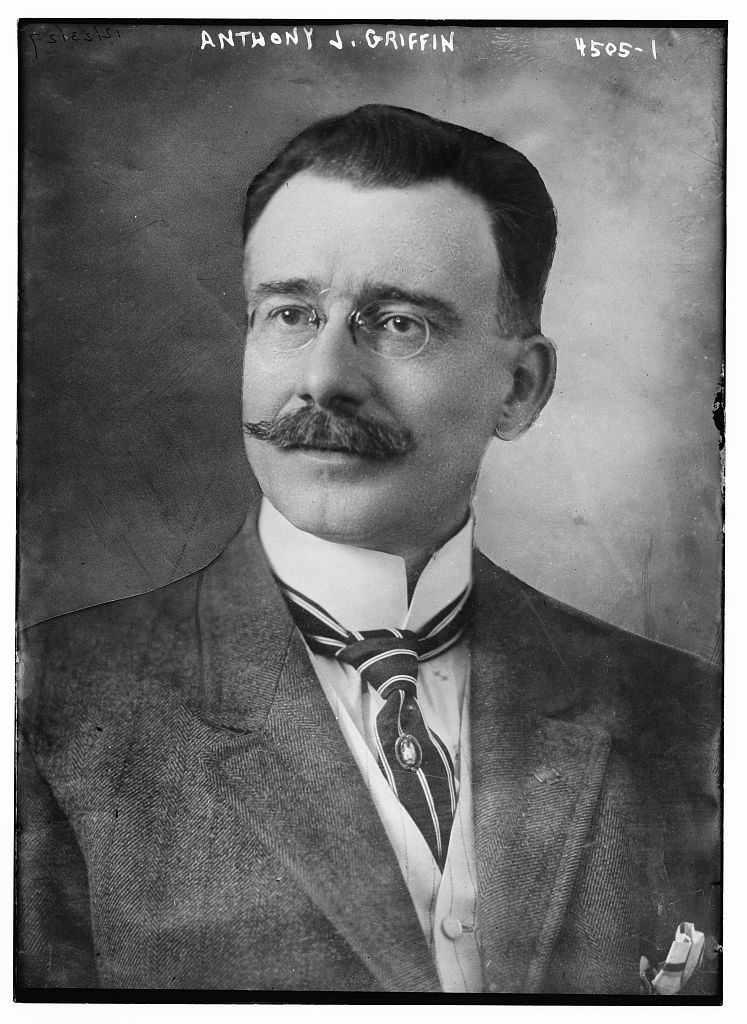

Member of the U.S. House of Representatives from New York's 22nd district
- In office March 5, 1918 – January 13, 1935
- Preceded by: Henry Bruckner
- Succeeded by: Edward W. Curley

Member of the New York Senate from the 22nd district
- In office January 1, 1911 – December 31, 1914
- Preceded by: George M. S. Schulz
- Succeeded by: James A. Hamilton

Personal details
- Born: April 1, 1866 New York City, US
- Died: January 13, 1935 (aged 68) New York City, US
- Resting place: Arlington National Cemetery
- Party: Democratic
- Education: City College, Cooper Union, New York University Law School
- Occupation: Lawyer, Soldier, Publisher

Anthony Jerome Griffin (April 1, 1866 – January 13, 1935) was an American lawyer, war veteran, and politician from New York. He served ten terms in the U.S. House of Representatives from 1918 to 1935. An amateur author he wrote poetry, stories and dramas. He wrote an epic poem entitled Chaos.

== Life ==
He attended City College, Cooper Union, and New York University School of Law. He was admitted to the bar in 1892, and practiced in New York City.

=== Spanish-American War ===
Griffin organized and commanded Company F, Sixty-ninth Regiment, New York Volunteer Infantry, in the Spanish–American War in 1898 and 1899. He founded and edited the Bronx Independent from 1905 to 1907.

=== State legislature ===
Griffin was member of the State Senate (22nd D.) from 1911 to 1914, sitting in the 134th, 135th, 136th and 137th New York State Legislatures.

He was a delegate to the New York State Constitutional Convention of 1915.

=== Congress ===
Griffin was elected as a Democrat to the 65th United States Congress to fill the vacancy caused by the resignation of Henry Bruckner. He was re-elected to the 66th and to the eight succeeding Congresses, and held office from March 5, 1918, until his death on January 13, 1935, in New York City.

=== Death and burial at Arlington National Cemetery ===
Griffin was buried at Arlington National Cemetery, Arlington, Virginia.

Following his death, Spencer Place behind the Bronx Post Office was renamed Anthony J. Griffin Place in his honor.

== See also ==
- List of members of the United States Congress who died in office (1900–1949)

== Sources ==
- United States Congress. "Anthony J. Griffin (id: G000457)". Biographical Directory of the United States Congress.

New York State Senate
Preceded by George M. S. Schulz	New York State Senate; 1911–1914	Succeeded by James A. Hamilton
U.S. House of Representatives
Preceded by Henry Bruckner	Member of the U.S. House of Representatives from New York's 22nd congressional district 1918–1935	Succeeded by Edward W. Curley
