= Harry Ring =

American journalist

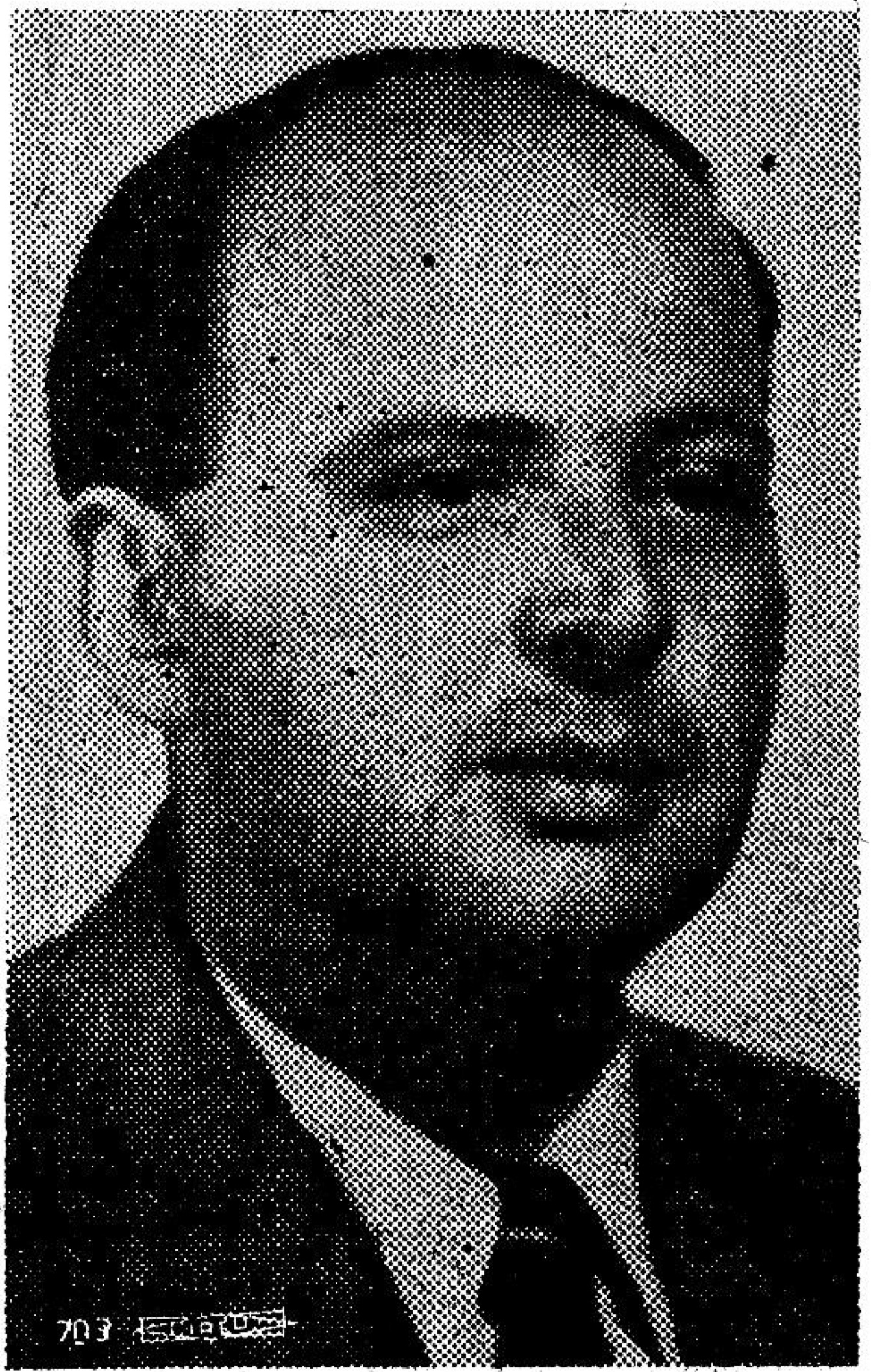

Harry Ring (1918 - April 18, 2007) was an American communist and a founding member of the Socialist Workers Party.

Ring joined the communist movement in Newark, New Jersey in 1936, and he served on the SWP’s National Committee from 1954 to 1981. In 1950, he ran on the SWP ticket for New York State Comptroller.

He wrote regularly for the party's New York City-based newspaper, The Militant, where he also had a weekly column called "The Great Society."

Ring covered racial relations, the civil rights struggle, and the Vietnam War issues in his journalistic work, as well as himself taking an active part in the organizing of anti-war protests.

Ring spent three months in Cuba in 1960 as a Militant reporter, writing about the Cuban Revolution. He remained in the SWP until his death in Los Angeles in 2007 at age 89, having been involved for over 71 years in the workers' movement.

== Works by Harry Ring ==
Aside from his columns for The Militant, Harry Ring has authored

- Cuba and Problems of Workers' Democracy. (New York: Pathfinder Press, 1972)
- How Cuba Uprooted Race Discrimination. (New York: Pioneer Publishers, 1961)
- Socialism and Individual Freedom. (New York: Pioneer Publishers, 1991)
