= Edward W. Curley =

American politician

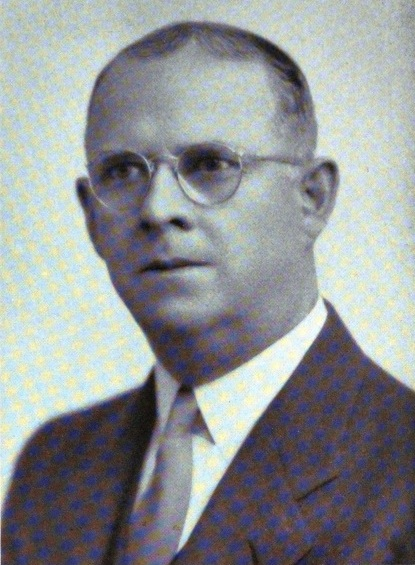

Member of the U.S. House of Representatives from New York's 22nd district
- In office November 5, 1935 – January 6, 1940
- Preceded by: Anthony J. Griffin
- Succeeded by: Walter A. Lynch

New York City Board of Aldermen
- In office 1916–1935

Personal details
- Born: May 23, 1873 Easton, Pennsylvania, U.S.
- Died: January 6, 1940 (aged 66) New York City, New York, U.S.
- Party: Democratic Party
- Education: City College of New York

Edward Walter Curley (May 23, 1873 – January 6, 1940) was a Democratic member of the United States House of Representatives from New York from 1935 to 1940.

== Biography ==
Curley was born in Easton, Pennsylvania. He attended the College of the City of New York.

=== Political career ===
He was a member of the New York City Council from 1916 until 1935. He was elected to Congress in 1935 to fill the vacancy caused by the death of Anthony J. Griffin and served from November 5, 1935, until his death in New York City.

== See also ==
- List of members of the United States Congress who died in office (1900–1949)

== Sources ==
- United States Congress. "Edward W. Curley (id: C000995)". Biographical Directory of the United States Congress.

U.S. House of Representatives
Preceded by Anthony J. Griffin	Member of the U.S. House of Representatives from New York's 22nd congressional district 1935–1940	Succeeded by Walter A. Lynch
