= 1950 New York gubernatorial election =

- November 7, 1950
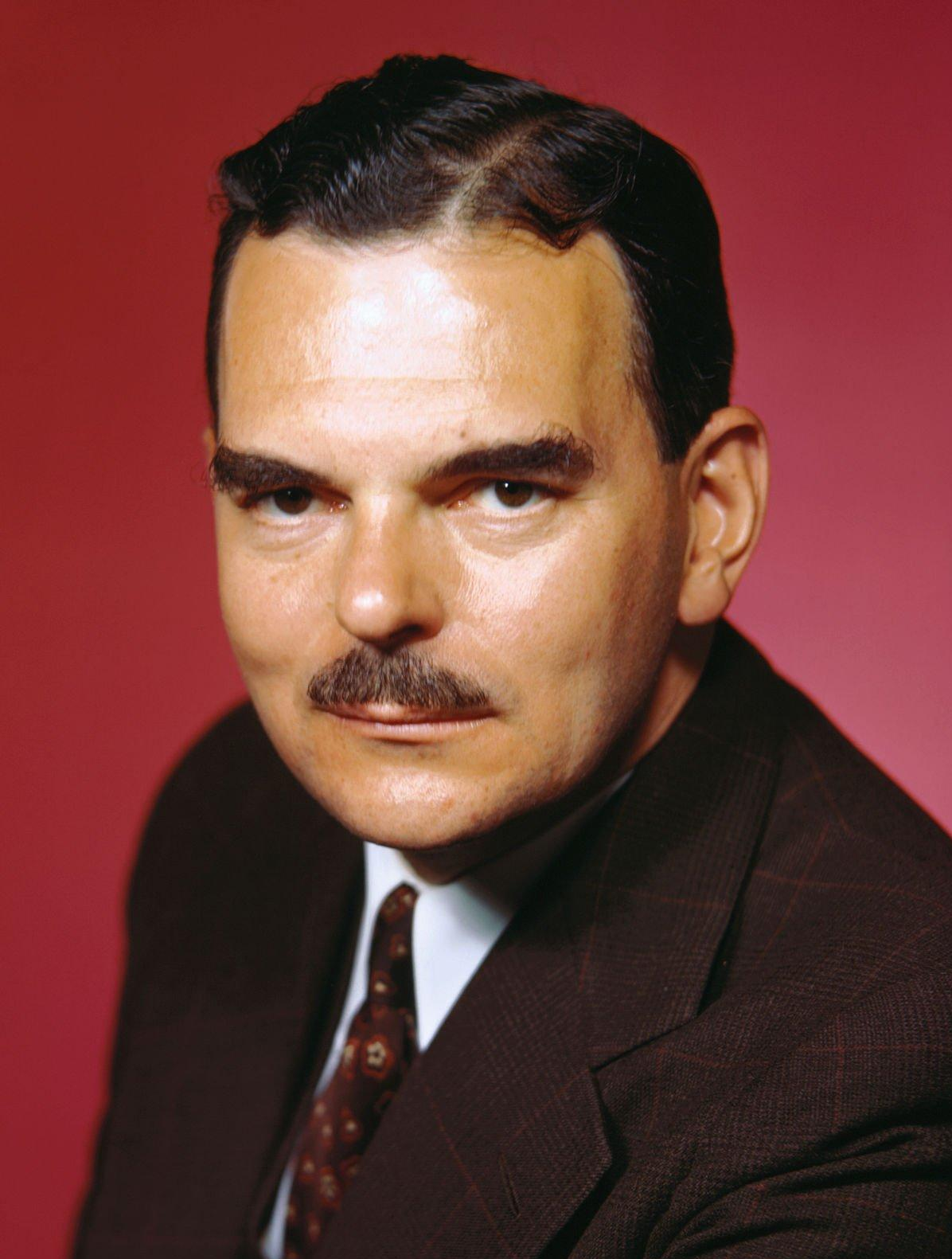

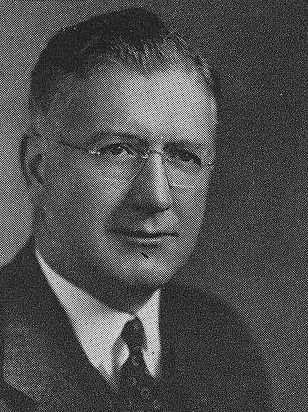
Nominee	Thomas E. Dewey	Walter A. Lynch
Party	Republican	Democratic
Alliance		Liberal
Popular vote	2,819,523	2,246,855
Percentage	53.11%	42.32%
- County results Dewey: 50–60% 60–70% 70–80% Lynch: 40–50% 50–60%
Governor before election
Thomas Dewey
Republican
Elected Governor
Thomas Dewey
Republican

The 1950 New York gubernatorial election was held on November 7, 1950, to elect the Governor and Lieutenant Governor of New York. Incumbent Republican governor Thomas E. Dewey was re-elected to a third term in office, defeating Democratic U.S. Representative Walter A. Lynch.

This was the final election in which the voters cast separate ballots for governor and lieutenant governor, ahead of a 1953 amendment to the New York Constitution.

== Republican nomination ==
=== Candidates ===
- Thomas E. Dewey, incumbent Governor since 1943

=== Results ===
Following his defeat in the 1948 presidential election, Governor Dewey initially elected not to run for a third term in office. However, he changed his decision two days ahead of the 1950 state convention and agreed to run for governor again.

Dewey was unopposed at the Republican convention in Saratoga Springs on September 6, and he was nominated by the delegates by acclamation. His nominating speech was given by Lieutenant Governor Joseph R. Hanley, and Dewey reciprocated by placing Hanley in nomination for U.S. Senate. In his acceptance speech, Dewey assailed Lynch and the Democratic ticket as "unknown, inexperienced" men.

== Democratic nomination ==
=== Candidates ===
- Walter A. Lynch, U.S. Representative from the Bronx

==== Declined ====
- Oscar R. Ewing, administrator of the Federal Security Agency
- James A. Farley, former United States Postmaster General and chair of the Democratic National Committee
- Franklin D. Roosevelt Jr., U.S. Representative from the Upper West Side and son of former President Franklin D. Roosevelt (declined September 6)

=== Results ===
The Democratic state convention was held at the Columbus Civic Center in Rochester. The convention was held amidst a general air of pessimism given general Republican sentiment throughout the country, though some drew parallels to the 1948 Democratic National Convention in Philadelphia, at which defeat seemed certain before Harry S. Truman eventually defeated Governor Dewey to win re-election. On the eve of the convention, Franklin D. Roosevelt Jr. announced that he would not be a candidate, conceding that Lynch had the support of the majority of delegates and the party's political bosses. His concession led to an hour-long demonstration, leading Roosevelt to reconsider his decision. After consulting with Daniel P. O'Connell, Roosevelt maintained his non-candidacy.

Despite party support for Lynch, led by U.S. Senator Herbert H. Lehman, some delegates attempted to draft another candidate who would be more likely to win the general election. Suggestions included Roosevelt, former Postmaster General and chair of the Democratic National Committee James A. Farley, and Federal Security Agency administrator Oscar R. Ewing. In reaction to this opposition, Senator Lehman opted to personally attend the convention in a show of support for Lynch.

In his acceptance speech, Lynch attacked Dewey and the Republicans for "represent[ing] now, as always, that small privileged class which has sought, for its own advantage, to have influence in government."

== Liberal nomination ==
=== Candidates ===
- Walter A. Lynch, U.S. Representative from the Bronx

==== Declined ====
- Adolf Berle, party chair and former U.S. Ambassador to Brazil and Assistant Secretary of State for Latin American Affairs

=== Results ===
The Liberal Party convention was held from September 6 to 7 at the Statler Hotel in New York City, intentionally overlapping with the Democratic convention in Rochester. After Lynch secured the Democratic nomination, dissatisfied delegates placed party chairman Adolf Berle into nomination. Berle declined the nomination, stating that the decision to back Lynch had been made by party leaders after "a great soul searching." He seconded Lynch's nomination, citing the need to re-elect Senator Lehman, and it was approved by acclamation.

== General election ==
=== Candidates ===
- Michael Bartell (Socialist Workers)
- Thomas E. Dewey, incumbent Governor since 1943 and nominee for President of the United States in 1948 (Republican)
- Eric Hass, perennial candidate (Industrial Government)
- Walter A. Lynch, U.S. Representative from the Bronx (Democratic and Liberal)
- John T. McManus, journalist (American Labor)

=== Results ===
1950 New York gubernatorial election
Party	Candidate	Votes	%	±%
Republican	Thomas E. Dewey (incumbent)	2,819,523	53.11%	
Democratic	Walter A. Lynch	1,981,156	37.32%	
Liberal	Walter A. Lynch	265,699	5.00%	
Total	Walter A. Lynch	2,246,855	42.32%	
American Labor	John T. McManus	221,966	4.18%	
Socialist Workers	Michael Bartell	13,274	0.25%	
Industrial Government	Eric Hass	7,254	0.13%	
Total votes		5,308,872	100.00%	
	Blank, void and scattering	164,176		
Turnout		5,473,048	100.00%	
