= Phineas L. Tracy =

American politician from New York State (1786–1876)

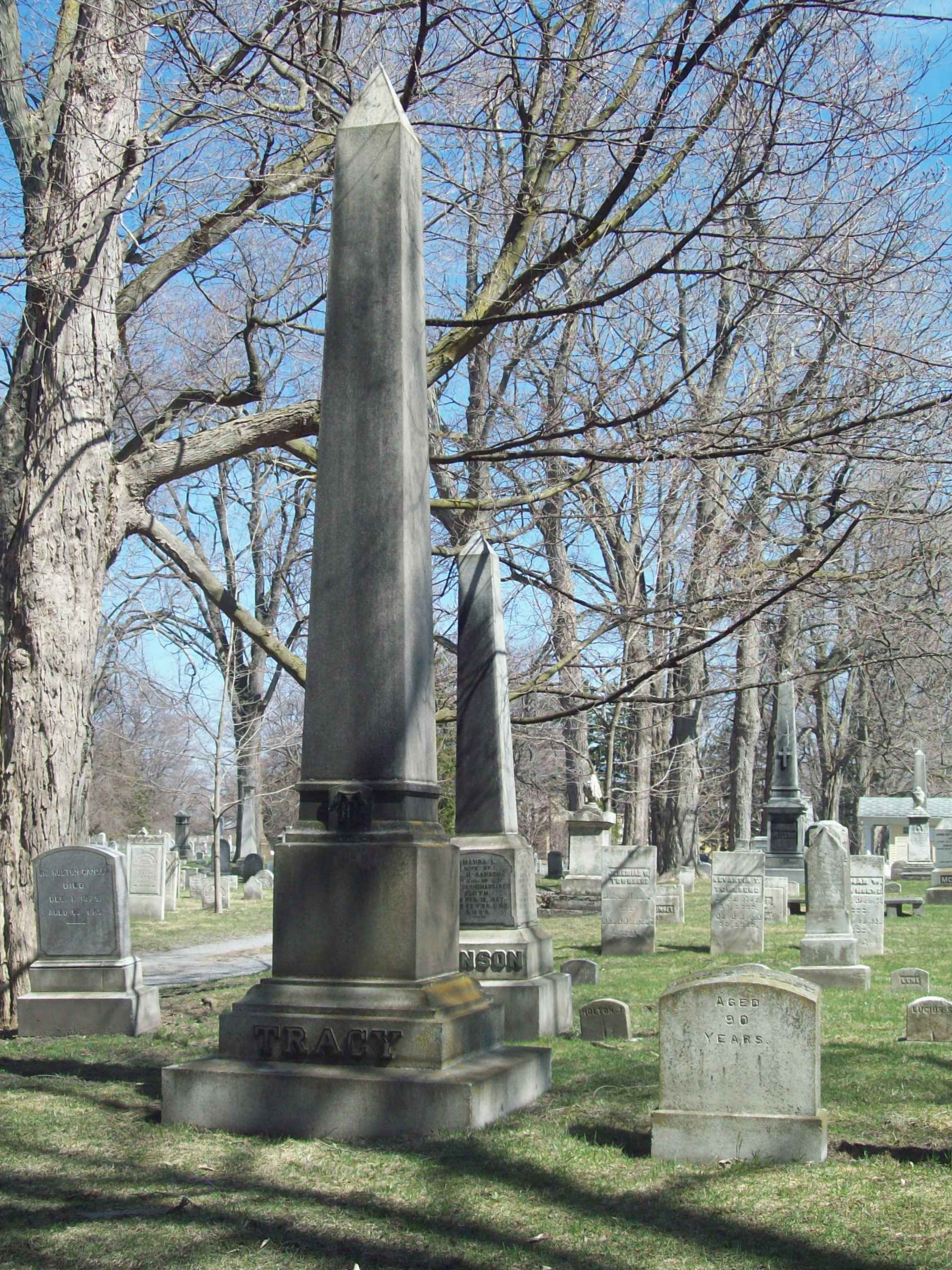

Member of the U.S. House of Representatives from New York's 29th district
- In office November 5, 1827 – March 3, 1833
- Preceded by: David Ellicott Evans
- Succeeded by: George W. Lay

Personal details
- Born: December 25, 1786 Norwich, Connecticut, U.S.
- Died: December 22, 1876 (aged 89) Batavia, New York, U.S.
- Party: Anti-Jacksonian (1827-1829); Anti-Masonic (1829-1833)

Phineas Lyman Tracy (December 25, 1786 – December 22, 1876) was a U.S. representative from New York, brother of Albert Haller Tracy.

Born in Norwich, Connecticut, Tracy graduated from Yale College in 1806. He engaged in teaching for two years. He studied law. He was admitted to the bar in 1811 and commenced practice in the village of Madison, New York. He moved to Batavia, Genesee County, about 1815 and continued the practice of law.

Tracy was elected to the Twentieth Congress to fill the vacancy caused by the resignation of David E. Evans. He was reelected as an Anti-Masonic candidate to the Twenty-first and Twenty-second Congresses and served from November 5, 1827, to March 3, 1833.

He was a presidential elector on the Whig ticket in 1840, voting for William Henry Harrison and John Tyler.

He was appointed presiding judge of Genesee County Court in 1841, and continued in that office until 1846, when he retired from public life. He died in Batavia, New York, December 22, 1876. He was interred in Batavia Cemetery.

== See also ==
- Fellows v. Blacksmith

U.S. House of Representatives
Preceded by David Ellicott Evans	Member of the U.S. House of Representatives from New York's 29th congressional district 1827–1833	Succeeded by George W. Lay
