= St. James Episcopal Church (Batavia, New York) =

Historic church in New York, United States

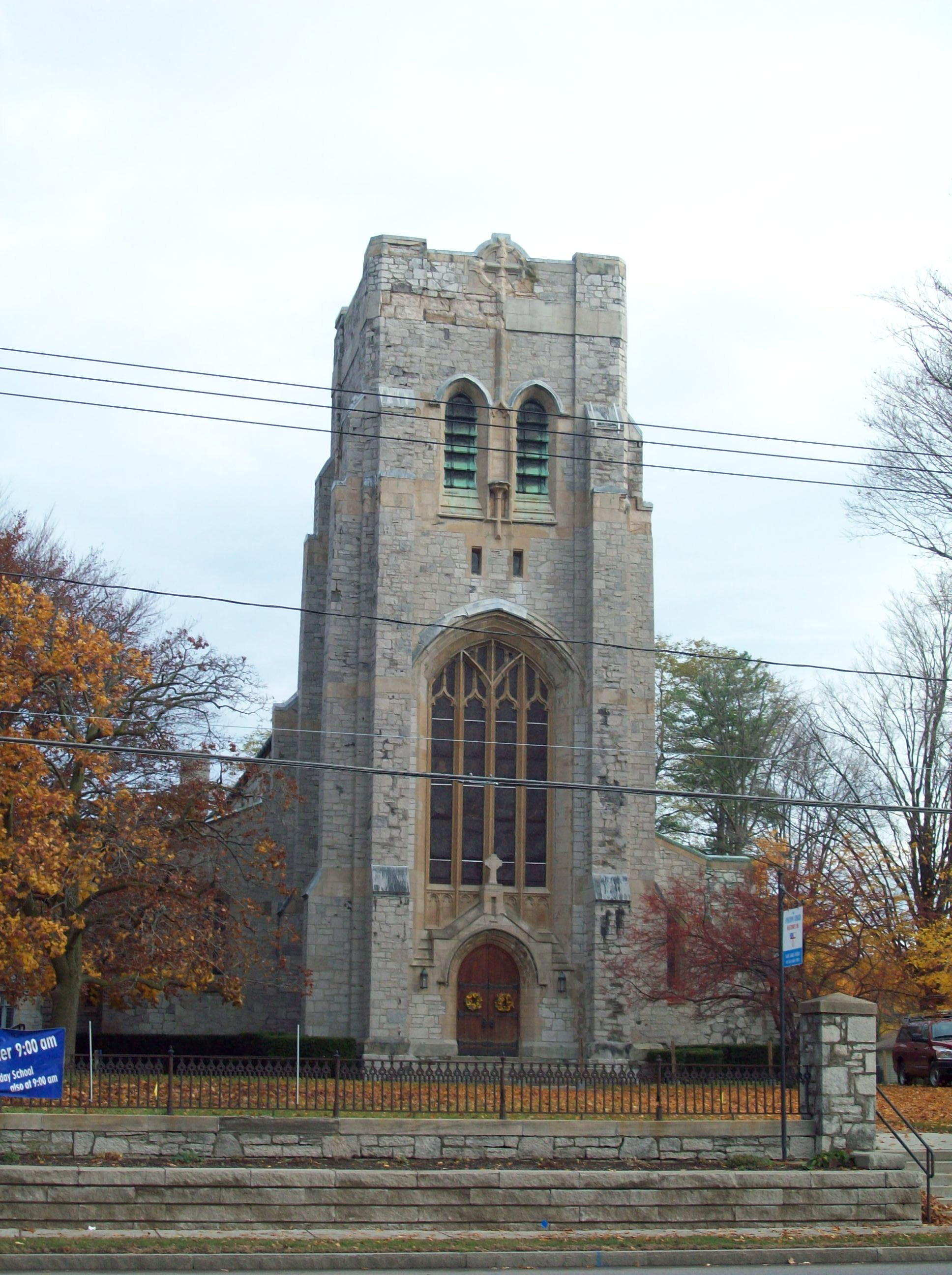
- South elevation of bell tower, 2009

Religion
- Affiliation: Episcopal Church
- Leadership: The Rev. Bonnie F. Morris
- Year consecrated: 1908

Location
- Location: Batavia, NY, USA
- Interactive map of St. James Episcopal Church
- Coordinates: 42°59′49″N 78°10′32″W

Architecture
- Architect: Robert North
- Style: Neo-Gothic
- Completed: 1908

Specifications
- Direction of façade: South
- Materials: Stone

U.S. National Register of Historic Places
- Added to NRHP: September 24, 2004
- NRHP Reference no.: 04001062

Website
- St. James Episcopal Church

St. James Episcopal Church is located on East Main Street (New York State Route 5) in Batavia, New York, United States. It is a stone Neo-Gothic structure built in the early 20th century.

It was the first of 65 similar churches, most also in Western New York, designed by Robert North, a former choirboy at the church. His design was informed by a trip he made to England, paid for by the dying widow who also underwrote the church's construction and wanted a design inspired by "the quiet spirit of the English countryside". North also followed contemporary architects like Ralph Adams Cram in their desire to extend the Gothic style beyond its medieval models, and made early use of newer building materials like reinforced concrete and cast stone.

It is the third building to house the church, which dates to the early years of Batavia's settlement a century before the church's construction. In 2004 the church building, its rectory and a stone wall were listed on the National Register of Historic Places. Around the same time it faced a scandal surrounding the dismissal of its pastor, and the costs of maintaining an aging building raised doubts as to whether the church could continue using it. Fundraising efforts have enabled the church to restore its bell tower.

== Buildings and grounds ==
The church complex is a 2.8-acre (1.1 ha) parcel on the north side of East Main, midway between Ross and Vine streets, just east of downtown Batavia. On the west are two older houses now serving as professional offices; to the east are houses. Across the street are several larger commercial buildings and their parking lots. To the north is a baseball diamond associated with one of the city's elementary schools. Richmond Memorial Library, also listed on the Register, is to the northeast. The church property is on a slight rise in the middle of an otherwise level area.

There are three buildings on the site, between the drives and parking areas on the east and west. The church itself is in the center, with the rectory to its northeast and a storage building to its northeast. A stone retaining wall with steps in the middle sets off the large lawn facing East Main on the south. All except the storage building are contributing properties to the Register listing.

=== Church ===
The church building itself has three sections. The main block, with the sanctuary, is a rectangular structure of sandstone laid in random ashlar sandstone with a steeply pitched gabled roof sheathed in blue and gray slate. It is dominated by the square bell tower at the south (front) end.

Along both sides are stepped stone buttresses. All the Tudor Revival arched doors and stained glass windows have smooth finished limestone and cast stone surrounds. The large windows on the north and south sides have Decorated Gothic stone mullions; the aisle windows have Perpendicular Gothic mullions with quatrefoil carvings in the apex. Small windows are located in the clerestory.

At the base of the bell tower is the wooden main entrance. Above it is the large southern window, with two vents having patinated copper louvers and an empty niche in between at the belfry stage. A bas-relief Celtic cross rises to the parapeted roofline.

On the west side is the church's office wing. It is a two-story Tudor Revival structure with the lower story sided in random ashlar stone and stucco and the upper in half-timber. At the top is a decorative cross-gabled roof; on the sides are multi-paned casement windows. A newer concrete block educational wing projects from its north.

==== Interior ====
Inside, the tower base's high arch makes it a narthex, with a glazed wood screen setting it apart from the nave. The white marble baptismal font is located in the center aisle a short distance from the nave. The floor is terra cotta panels set in cast concrete. Walls are done in unpainted stone, cast stone and plaster scored to resemble stone. Dark stained oak panels complement the similar pews.

The west aisle leads to a chantry altar and aumbry. Behind it is the organ chamber. A wood screen similar to the narthex screen sets off the chapel on the east side.

At the north end is a traditional deep square chancel set off from the nave by a stone wall with brass gates. A white marble pulpit and lectern with brass eagle motif flank the steps. In the center is the white marble altar, originally against the north wall. Now located behind it is a paneled reredos with three niches. The center one has a figure of Christ holding his hand out in blessing. It is flanked by smaller niches with figures of St. James and St. John. On either side of the chancel are choir stalls.

The inside of the office wing is minimally decorated. It has plaster walls and simple architrave door and window surrounds. The doors are paneled oak; other woodwork is stained in dark walnut. To the north the education wing has plain walls of painted concrete block; the fellowship hall has a large ceiling on laminated Tudor arched trusses.

=== Rectory and storage building ===
The rectory is a two-story Tudor Revival house with a cross-gabled roof. A garage is attached to the north. Its half-timbered stucco walls have a bank of casement windows on the south and paired casement windows elsewhere. The storage building is a simple gabled wood frame building with a north-south orientation. On its south end a rolling door is sheltered by a deep projection of the roof supported by wooden posts.

== History ==
The St. James congregation was founded in 1815, in the early days of Batavia's settlement as the center of the Holland Purchase, most of today's Western New York, eight years before the settlement itself was incorporated as a village. Throughout the rest of the century, it occupied two buildings on Ellicott Street, neither of which are extant. Adelaide Richmond Kenny, a congregant and the only daughter of Dean Richmond, a local railroad executive who served as president of the New York Central, donated the money for the new church in the last years of her life. It was the culmination of over three decades of local philanthropy following her brief marriage, in which she also endowed nearby Batavia Hospital.

In the early years of the 20th century, she gave Robert North $600 ($23,000 in contemporary dollars.) to travel to the United Kingdom, directing him to "design a church in the quiet spirit of the English countryside." He received the formal commission three days after Kenny died.

That instruction brought North, a former St. James choirboy who had studied architecture at Cornell, into close contact with the type of churches held up as architectural exemplars in The Ecclesiologist a half-century before. Those English country churches had inspired Richard Upjohn, Frederick Clarke Withers and other Gothic Revival architects of that era. Contemporary architects like Ralph Adams Cram, Bertram Goodhue and Henry Vaughan were also designing churches from those models, but they believed that the style offered potential that had not been explored when it initially fell out of favor in the 16th century. Their churches, which emphasized clarity of design and functionality over the Picturesque elements of the earlier Gothic-inspired architects, were called Neo-Gothic.

North's church was a sophisticated example of the style, one that anticipates later neo-Gothic churches. It recalls medieval models with its restrained decoration and buttresses outside. The inside also seems at first to be strictly following medieval precepts, but the high arch in the lower story of the tower, giving the effect of a continuation of the nave, departs from that model. North also made use of some new building materials of his time, such as structural reinforced concrete, particularly in the floor, and cast stone in the exterior tracery. He went on to design 65 other churches throughout Western New York in a similar style.

The rectory was built in the same Tudor Revival as the office wing, in 1929. In 1953 the education wing was added to the latter's north end. Inside the sanctuary the altar has been moved off the north wall, in keeping with modern liturgical trends. There have been no other significant changes to the building and grounds since construction.

As its centennial neared, St. James was at the center of a scandal. Rector Simon Howson was dismissed in 2004 after allegations that he had stolen from the church. A month later he filed a wrongful termination suit against the Episcopal Diocese of Western New York, claiming he had been retaliated against by the bishop for reporting sexual harassment by a visiting gay priest from Massachusetts. He was defrocked in 2007. The following year he and the diocese settled for an undisclosed amount.

At that time the building's design and age were also issues for the church. The costs of maintaining its declining structure were further strained when the church's endowment fund lost money during the 2008 financial crisis. Utility bills alone reached $60,000 a month. Howson's replacement had to leave since the congregation could not afford a full-time pastor, and the congregation pondered whether it should leave the building. Under new vicar Stephen Metcalfe, who took over in 2010, the church is hoping to raise the money to rehabilitate the aging bell tower.

== See also ==
- National Register of Historic Places listings in Genesee County, New York
