= Hudson River Steamboat Association =

The Hudson River Steamboat Association was a cartel that operated passenger steamboats on the Hudson River in the U.S. state of New York from 1832 to 1843. It successfully monopolized passenger steamboat traffic on the river between New York City and Albany, New York, and enriched its members through the charging of monopoly prices. The cartel was challenged in 1834 by Cornelius Vanderbilt and by Daniel Drew in 1835; the cartel bribed Vanderbilt to leave the steamboat business, and bribed Drew to join the cartel.

== History ==
The Hudson River Steamboat Association (HRSA) formed in October 1832. This cartel consisted of the major steamboat lines operating on the Hudson River between New York City and Albany. Member of the cartel included James and Robert Stevens of Hoboken, New Jersey (sons of inventor John Stevens, who founded the Camden and Amboy Railroad), and Dean Richmond, wealthy Albany businessman and political kingmaker. The HRSA was likely the largest steamboat line in the nation. Under the cartel's rules, each owner managed his own steamboat. After expenses were paid, all profits were pooled and then shared on an equal basis. The HRSA acted like a monopoly: It paid competitors to keep their ships idle. (Note: In 1832, HRSA member Robert Stevens decided to leave the cartel. He received $80,000 ($2,580,000 in 2025 dollars) so that he would keep his steamboat off the river. He also agreed not to run another boat on the river for up to 10 years.) As the only passenger fleet on the Hudson, the HRSA dictated routes and schedules. It ran few boats and charged high fares, ensuring significantly higher profits. All cartel ships charged a base fare of $3 ($97 in 2025 dollars) for a one-way passenger ticket.

By 1834, the cartel had expanded to include passenger operations on the North River (the lower Hudson from Upper New York Bay north to Hastings-on-Hudson) and between Albany and Troy, New York.

=== The Vanderbilt price war ===
In April 1834, the passenger steamboat Westchester began making a daytime run between New York and Albany. It charged just $2 ($65 in 2025 dollars) for a one-way ticket. Cornelius Vanderbilt had financed construction of the Westchester, which was launched in 1832. At 230 short tons (210 t), she was the largest ship on the Hudson.

Sources differ widely on who owned the Westchester, and when. Historian Clifford Browder says at one point that, by 1834, Vanderbilt had sold the Westchester to three investors from New Jersey. Vanderbilt then secretly leased the vessel as a means of testing the cartel's determination and ruthlessness in preserving its monopoly. The following July, businessman Daniel Drew leased the Westchester with Vanderbilt's knowledge and connivance. The HRSA accused Vanderbilt of being behind Drew, but Vanderbilt denied all association with him. Later, however, Browder says Vanderbilt still owned the ship as late as 1834. Vanderbilt biographer Edward Renehan, however, says Vanderbilt owned the Westchester until 1834, when he sold it to Daniel Drew. Vanderbilt used the proceeds from the sale to Champion and Nimrod, vessels launched in August 1834. Even more confusingly, steamship historian Edwin Dunbaugh says Vanderbilt purchased, but did not build, the Champion and Nimrod.

Whoever the owner of the Westchester was, Drew was in charge of its operations. He began running the ship during the day, three times a week. At first, he charged $2 ($65 in 2025 dollars) per fare, but then lowered the price to $1 ($32 in 2025 dollars) per fare. In response, the HRSA cut its fares to $2 ($65 in 2025 dollars) per one-way ticket, and scheduled the steamboat Peekskill so that it competed against the Westchester for passengers and freight.

Vanderbilt then entered the competition, assigning his steamboats Champion and Nimrod (which had formerly operated only on Long Island Sound) to make the New York-to-Albany run as well. Vanderbilt upped the ante on August 21, 1834, by announcing the formation of a new steamboat company, known as the "People's Line". (Note: This was not the first time the name had been used. Shippers in nearby New Jersey had originally used the title for their steamboat line.) At first, the People's Line made only daytime runs between New York and Albany at a price of $1 ($32 in 2025 dollars) per one-way ticket. But soon the People's Line was making overnight runs with the Westchester and another Vanderbilt vessel, the Union. (Note: Vanderbilt constructed the Union in 1833.) Eventually, Vanderbilt had a ship running in each direction every day of the week.

The People's Line then dropped fares to just 50 cents ($16 in 2025 dollars) per ticket. Fares dropped to 10 cents ($3 in 2025 dollars) and then to zero by November.

Several factors allowed Vanderbilt to charge nothing for fares. First, Vanderbilt had carefully calculated the cost of making a one-way trip, and found it to be $200 ($6,450 in 2025 dollars). He realized that he could break even just by selling food to passengers on the trip. To provide him with an operating cushion, he even increased substantially the price of food offered on his ships. Second, Vanderbilt realized that the increase in passenger volume (created by 50 cent or 10 cent fares) would more than offset the loss in revenue created by the fare cuts. Third, the HRSA, with many more ships competing for passengers, would lose money faster than Vanderbilt, who had only three. Finally, Vanderbilt had other sources of income due to his extensive steamship, freight, and other businesses in the New York City and New Jersey areas. Most members of the HRSA did not, and thus could not absorb for long the losses Vanderbilt visited on them.

The passenger season came to an end in December 1834 when heavy ice forced the annual halt to all Hudson River ship traffic. At the end of December, the HRSA designated Robert Stevens to negotiate with Vanderbilt and determine what it would take to have him exit the Hudson River passenger business. The HRSA eventually bribed Vanderbilt by agreeing to pay him $100,000 ($3,120,968 in 2025 dollars) in 1835 and $5,000 per year for the next decade; in return, Vanderbilt agreed not to engage in any Hudson River freight or passenger shipping for the next 10 years.

=== The Drew price war ===
In December 1834 or January 1835, Daniel Drew bought the Westchester from Vanderbilt. Drew began making the New York-to-Albany run three times a week in March 1835, charging $1 ($31 in 2025 dollars) for a one-way ticket. The HRSA was outraged, sure that Vanderbilt had violated his agreement with them. In fact, Drew had had new allies: Alanson P. St. John, captain of the Westchester; Eli Kelly, a wealthy farmer from Carmel, New York; and James Raymond, owner of extensive real estate in Carmel. Drew attempted to buy a second boat, but HRSA pressured steamboat owners in the New York City are to not sell to him. Drew approached Vanderbilt, who willingly sold him the Emerald for $26,000 ($811,452 in 2025 dollars).

On July 21, 1835, Drew formed a new company, the People's Line Association, and pledged to challenge the HRSA even more forcefully than Vanderbilt had. The HRSA this time asked Drew to join their cartel, which he did. The inducement was a $50,000 ($1,560,484 in 2025 dollars) sum payable in 1835, and $10,000 per year thereafter for 10 years.

=== The De Witt Clinton incident ===
Some time in the late 1830s, Isaac Newton, part owner of the steamship De Witt Clinton, was admitted to HRSA to keep him from establishing a competing line.

In the spring 1840, Captain Joseph W. Hancox of the Napoleon began making the New York-to-Albany run. Competition between Hancox and the HRSA caused one-way ticket prices to fall to just $1 ($32 in 2025 dollars) that year. The HRSA attempted to bribe Hancox to cease service, but he could not be bought off.

Newton proposed that the Napoleon be eliminated, and the other members of the HRSA agreed. On June 13, with Newton aboard her, the De Witt Clinton deliberately rammed the Napoleon. Newton clearly attempted to sink the other vessel, but did not hit Napoleon squarely amidships. Law enforcement ironically arrested Hancox, after members of the HRSA signed a document accusing him of causing the "accident". Hancox was exonerated in a court of law, and soon one-way ticket prices fell to 50 cents ($16 in 2025 dollars).

== End of the cartel ==
The HRSA was disintegrating by the late 1830s due to external competition and internal squabbling. At issue was the basic tactic used to keep competition at bay: Bribes to keep other ships idle, the New York Herald newspaper estimated, were running $250,000 ($7,558,594 in 2025 dollars) a year in 1839.

Innovation proved to be the end of the HRSA. In 1840, Newton and some other investors built the North America, first Hudson River steamboat to use anthracite coal for fuel rather than the increasingly expensive pine wood. The following year, Drew and Newton jointly financed the construction of a sister ship, the South America. It was joined by the coal-fired Knickerbocker in 1843.

Coal-fired engines were more efficient, and allowed vessels to be much larger. The financial advantages were so large, there was no point in Drew remaining part of the HRSA (where his profits subsidized less efficient shippers). The HRSA broke because of the innovations on Drew's ships, and dissolved in 1843.

Some of the other partners in the HRSA withdrew from the passenger ship business altogether, while others moved their ships to other rivers or into bays or along the coast.

On July 1, 1843, Drew, Newton, Vanderbilt, and 20 others formed a joint stock company named the "People's Line Association", and began running ships from New York City to Albany and to Troy, New York.

== Bibliography ==
- Adams, Arthur G. (1996). The Hudson Through the Years. New York: Fordham University Press. ISBN 9780823216765.
- Browder, Clifford (2014). Money Game in Old New York: Daniel Drew and His Times. Lexington, Ky.: University Press of Kentucky. ISBN 9780813151472.
- The Capstone Encyclopaedia of Business. Oxford, UK: Capstone Publishing. 2003. ISBN 9781841120539.
- Dunbaugh, Edwin (1992). Night Boat to New England, 1815-1900. New York: Greenwood Press. ISBN 9780313277337.
- Folsom, Burton W. (1991). The Myth of the Robber Barons. Herndon, Va.: Young America's Foundation. ISBN 9780963020307.
- Hilton, George Woodman (1968). The Night Boat. Berkeley, Calif.: Howell-North Books.
- Renehan, Edward (2009). Commodore: The Life of Cornelius Vanderbilt. New York: Basic Books. ISBN 9780465002566.
- Selden, Henry R. (1860). Reports of Cases Argued and Determined in the Court of Appeals of the State of New-York. Volume VI. Albany, N.Y.: Weare C. Little, Law Bookseller.
- Stiles, T.J. (2009). The First Tycoon: The Epic Life of Cornelius Vanderbilt. New York: Alfred A. Knopf. ISBN 9780375415425.
- Vanderbilt, Arthur T. (1989). Fortune's Children: The Fall of the House of Vanderbilt. New York: Quill. ISBN 9780688103866.
