= William C. Hennessy =

American civil servant and political figure

William Connor Hennessy

Chairman of the New York Democratic Party
- In office December 1982 – December 1984
- Preceded by: Dominic J. Baranello
- Succeeded by: Laurence J. Kirwan

Personal details
- Born: 1926 or 1927; Wellsville, New York
- Died: November 2, 2001 (aged 74); St. Peters Hospital; Albany, New York
- Political party: Democratic

William Connor Hennessy (1926 or 1927 - November 2, 2001) was an American civil servant and political figure. From 1982 to 1984, Hennessy served as chairman of the New York Democratic Party.

== Career ==
Hennessy worked at the New York State Department of Transportation for several decades, with his first position being a chainman in 1946. Governor Carey appointed Hennessy as Transportation Commissioner in 1977.

In July 1987, Hennessy was appointed chairman of the New York State Thruway. He resigned the position in 1988.

Governor Mario Cuomo chose Hennessy as chairman of the state Democratic Party in 1982. As chairman, Hennessy improved the party's finances. He resigned in 1984, citing health reasons.

== Personal life ==
Hennessy married Corrinne Schwalb in 1951.
