= Richmond Memorial Library =

- U.S. National Register of Historic Places
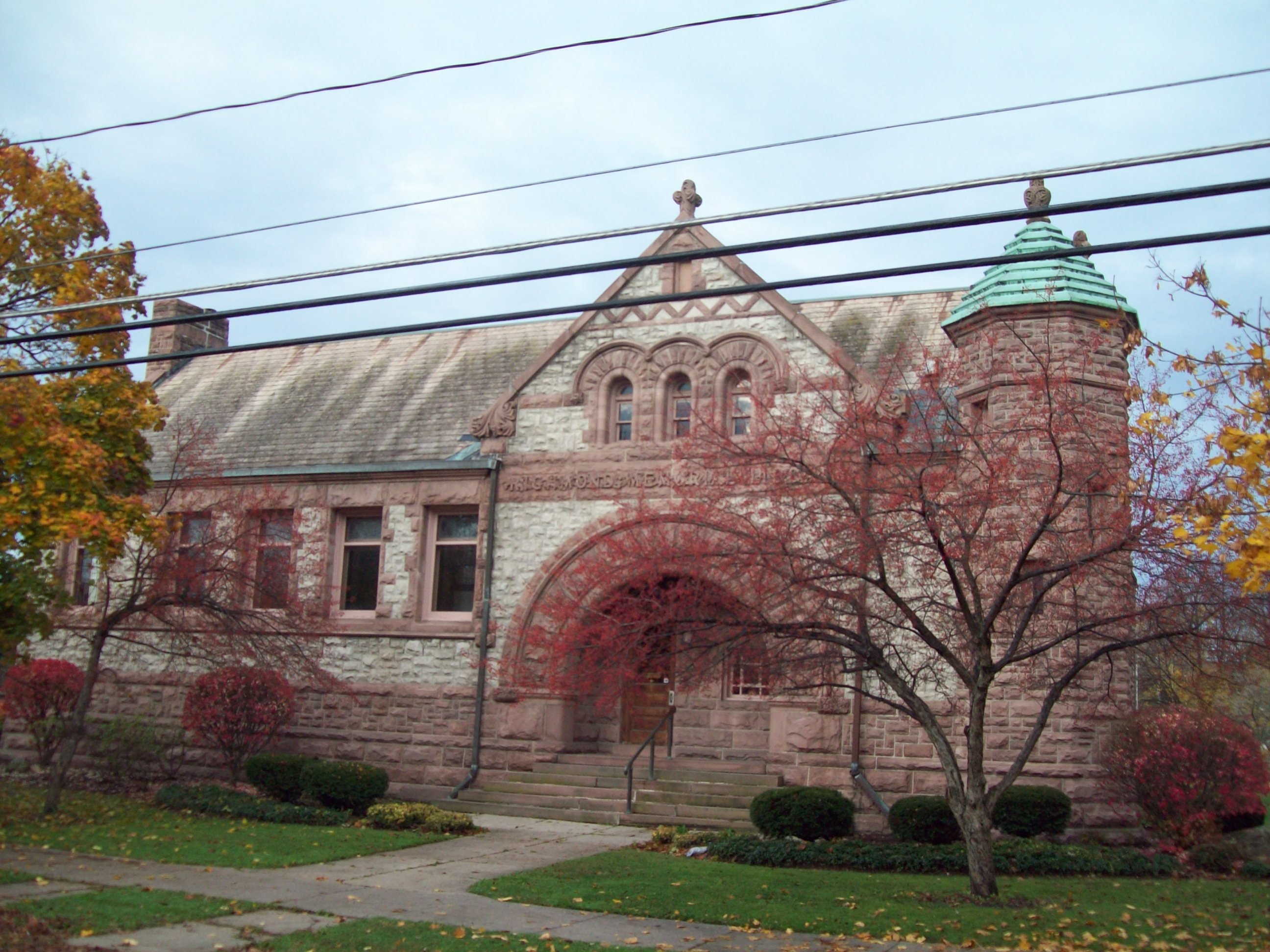
- West elevation, 2009

- Location within New York Location within the United States
- Location: Batavia, NY
- Coordinates: 42°59′52″N 78°10′38″W
- Built: 1887
- Architect: James Goold Cutler
- Architectural style: Romanesque, Richardsonian Romanesque
- NRHP reference No.: 74001239
- Added to NRHP: July 24, 1974

The Richmond Memorial Library is located on Ross Street in Batavia, New York, United States. It is an 1880s stone structure in the Richardsonian Romanesque style designed by Rochester architect James Goold Cutler.

His design was strongly inspired by several libraries in Massachusetts that Richardson himself had recently built. It was commissioned by local philanthropist Mary E. Richmond, wife of Dean Richmond, in 1889, as a memorial to her youngest son, Dean Richmond Jr. It was listed on the National Register of Historic Places in 1974.

== Building ==
The library is located on the west side of Ross Street approximately 200 feet (61 m) north of East Main Street (New York state routes 5 and 33). The neighborhood, just east of the commercial core area of downtown Batavia, is predominantly residential, with some institutional structures. Resurrection Parish Catholic church is to the southwest and another large brick building is to the northwest. Further to the northeast is one of Batavia's schools; St. James Episcopal Church, also on the Register, is a half-block to the east. The terrain is level and some mature trees grow in the front yards and along lot lines.

The building itself consists of the original building and a larger modern addition in its rear. The older section is a one-and-a-half-story L-shaped structure of sandstone in a random ashlar pattern, mostly grey with local red Albion stone as trim. Both sections have a steeply pitched gabled roof, with the projecting main entrance pavilion, off-center to the north, creating a cross-gable. At the northeast corner is an octagonal tower with conical top sheathed in copper and finial. A chimney rises from the south end.

Steps lead up to the wide round segmental arch on low imposts, a particularly Richardsonian detail, which shelters the recessed main entrance. Inscribed in the stone above are ornate letters reading "Richmond Memorial Library". Above that are three small, narrow round-arched windows with some decorative stonework and a narrower, smaller window in the gable apex. Five deeply recessed sash windows with leaded glass transoms fill out the facade to the south end. The north gable has a similar set of round-arched windows in its apex.

Inside, the reading room occupies most of the long wing. Behind an arch at the south end is a fireplace. Oak wainscoting extends halfway to the ceiling, from which an iron chandelier hangs.

== History ==
Dean Richmond Jr., died in his youth. His mother chose a piece of property near the family mansion as the site of a library to be built in his memory and donated to the city. She commissioned a design from James Goold Cutler, a builder and businessman who had invented the mail chute and later mayor of Rochester.

Cutler consciously emulated several Romanesque libraries that had been built in recent years by Henry Hobson Richardson in the suburbs of Boston. Several of those had also been built in memory of a member of the family of a wealthy local philanthropist. Most prominent among those is the Thomas Crane Public Library in Quincy, the pattern for the Richmond Library.

Like the Crane Library, today designated a National Historic Landmark, the Richmond Library employs a similar face of two-toned sandstone in a random ashlar pattern with a battered foundation, with a steep gabled roof. The entrance pavilion of both buildings is very similar, with the large arch and tripartite narrow windows. Turrets of similar height are also nearby. Inside, the Richmond has the oblong reading room with fireplace that characterizes Richardson's libraries. The only notable difference is in the front facade's remaining fenestration—the Crane Library has what Henry-Russell Hitchcock described as a "curiously modern" strip of windows, while Cutler's are more conventional for the time.

At the time of its construction, only the east (front) facade of the Richmond Library was done in stone. The north face's exposed brick was covered in matching sandstone when that wing was expanded in 1911, and the rear elevations remained brick until the modern wing was built. Inside, the only significant change was the addition of stacks to the reading room in 1900 as the library expanded.

== The library today ==
The library is governed by a five-member board of trustees elected by residents of the Batavia City School District. All serve five-year terms; one is elected a year. The board meets the second Monday of each month.

The library's mission statement is "to continually assure access to resources and services that meet the educational, informational and recreational needs of its community in a safe and comfortable environment". It is open every day except Sundays and holidays, with earlier closing hours on Fridays and Saturdays. In addition to services for children and teens it offers classes for adults interested in genealogy.

== See also ==
- National Register of Historic Places listings in Genesee County, New York
