= William Patterson (New York politician) =

American politician

Member of the U.S. House of Representatives from New York's 29th district
- In office March 4, 1837 – August 14, 1838
- Preceded by: George W. Lay
- Succeeded by: Vacant

Personal details
- Born: June 4, 1789 Londonderry, New Hampshire, U.S.
- Died: August 14, 1838 (aged 49) Warsaw, New York, U.S.
- Resting place: Warsaw Town Cemetery; Warsaw, New York
- Party: Whig
- Relations: George Washington Patterson; Augustus Frank
- Parent(s): Thomas Patterson; Elizabeth (Wallace) Patterson
- Profession: Farmer; Manufacturer; Politician

William Patterson (June 4, 1789 – August 14, 1838) was an American farmer, manufacturer and politician. He served as a United States representative from the U.S. state of New York.

== Early life ==
Patterson was born in Londonderry, Rockingham County, New Hampshire, the son of Thomas and Elizabeth (Wallace) Patterson. He attended the common schools and moved to Rensselaerville, Albany County, New York in 1815. The following year Patterson moved to Lyons, Wayne County where he engaged in the manufacture and sale of fanning mills. In 1822, he moved to a farm near Warsaw, New York and engaged in agricultural pursuits, and then settled in Warsaw in 1837.

== Political career ==
Patterson held several local offices in Warsaw, and was elected as a Whig candidate to the Twenty-fifth Congress. He served in Congress from March 4, 1837 until his death in Warsaw on August 14, 1838. He is interred in the Warsaw Town Cemetery.

== Family life ==
Patterson's brother, George Washington Patterson, and nephew, Augustus Frank, were also members of the U. S. House of Representatives from New York.

== See also ==
- List of members of the United States Congress who died in office (1790–1899)

U.S. House of Representatives
Preceded by George W. Lay	Member of the U.S. House of Representatives from New York's 29th congressional district 1837–1838	Succeeded by Vacant
