= 1950 New York state election =

- November 7, 1950

The 1950 New York state election was held on November 7, 1950, to elect the governor, the lieutenant governor, the state comptroller, the attorney general and a U.S. senator, as well as all members of the New York State Assembly and the New York State Senate.

== Nominations ==
The Socialist Workers state convention met on July 9, and nominated Michael Bartell for Governor; Gladys Barker for Lieutenant Governor; and Joseph Hansen for the U.S. Senate. The petition to nominate candidates was filed on September 5 with the Secretary of State.

The American Labor state convention met on September 6 and nominated John T. McManus for Governor; Dr. Clementina J. Paolone, an obstetrician, for Lieutenant Governor; Michael Jiminez for Comptroller; Frank Scheiner for Attorney General; and Dr. W.E.B. DuBois for the U.S. Senate.

The Republican state convention met on September 7 at Saratoga Springs, New York. They re-nominated Governor Thomas E. Dewey and Attorney General Nathaniel L. Goldstein; and nominated Lieutenant Governor Joe R. Hanley for the U.S. Senate; Comptroller Frank C. Moore for Lieutenant Governor; and State Senator J. Raymond McGovern for Comptroller.

The Democratic state convention met on September 7 at Rochester, New York, and nominated Congressman Walter A. Lynch for Governor; Richard H. Balch for Lieutenant Governor; New York City Treasurer Spencer C. Young for Comptroller; Francis J. D'Amanda for Attorney General; and re-nominated the incumbent U.S. Senator Herbert H. Lehman

The Liberal state convention met on September 6 and 7 at the Statler Hotel in New York City, and endorsed the Democratic nominees Lynch and Lehman, but rejected the other three. However, on September 11, the Liberal State Committee substituted the other three Democratic nominees Balch, Young and D'Amanda on the ticket.

== Result ==
Almost the whole Republican ticket was elected in a landslide. Only the Democratic incumbent U.S. Senator, Ex-Governor Herbert H. Lehman, managed to stay in office.

The incumbents Dewey, Goldstein and Lehman were re-elected.

This was the last election with separate votes for Governor and Lieutenant Governor. An amendment adopted in 1953 required the voters to cast a joint vote for the candidates running for these two offices on any ticket, which has been done since the election of 1954.

1950 state election results
Office	Republican ticket		Democratic ticket		Liberal ticket		American Labor ticket		Socialist Workers ticket		Industrial Government ticket	
Governor	Thomas E. Dewey	2,819,523	Walter A. Lynch	1,981,156	Walter A. Lynch	265,699	John T. McManus	221,966	Michael Bartell	13,274	Eric Hass	7,254
Lieutenant Governor	Frank C. Moore	2,615,369	Richard H. Balch	1,942,902	Richard H. Balch	256,872	Clementina J. Paolone	220,898	Gladys Barker	13,399	Nathan Karp	8,334
Comptroller	J. Raymond McGovern	2,523,744	Spencer C. Young	1,997,149	Spencer C. Young	260,110	Michael Jiminez	209,845	Harry Ring	11,732	Bronko Papadopolos	10,276
Attorney General	Nathaniel L. Goldstein	2,524,134	Francis J. D'Amanda	1,983,949	Francis J. D'Amanda	245,972	Frank Scheiner	212,990	Arthur Preis	12,392		
U.S. Senator	Joe R. Hanley	2,367,353	Herbert H. Lehman	2,319,719	Herbert H. Lehman	312,594	W. E. B. Du Bois	205,729	Joseph Hansen	13,340	Stephen Emery	7,559

Obs.:

- "Blank, void and scattering" votes: 164,176 (Gov.)
- The vote for Governor is used to define ballot access, for automatic access are necessary 50,000 votes.

== See also ==
- New York gubernatorial elections
- New York state elections

== Sources ==
- Official Result: DEWEY'S PLURALITY OFFICIALLY 572,668; Canvassers' Tabulation Shows Lehman Defeated Hanley by Margin of 246,960 in NYT on December 15, 1950 (subscription required)

New York Red Book 1951
