= William Wallace Farley =

American lawyer

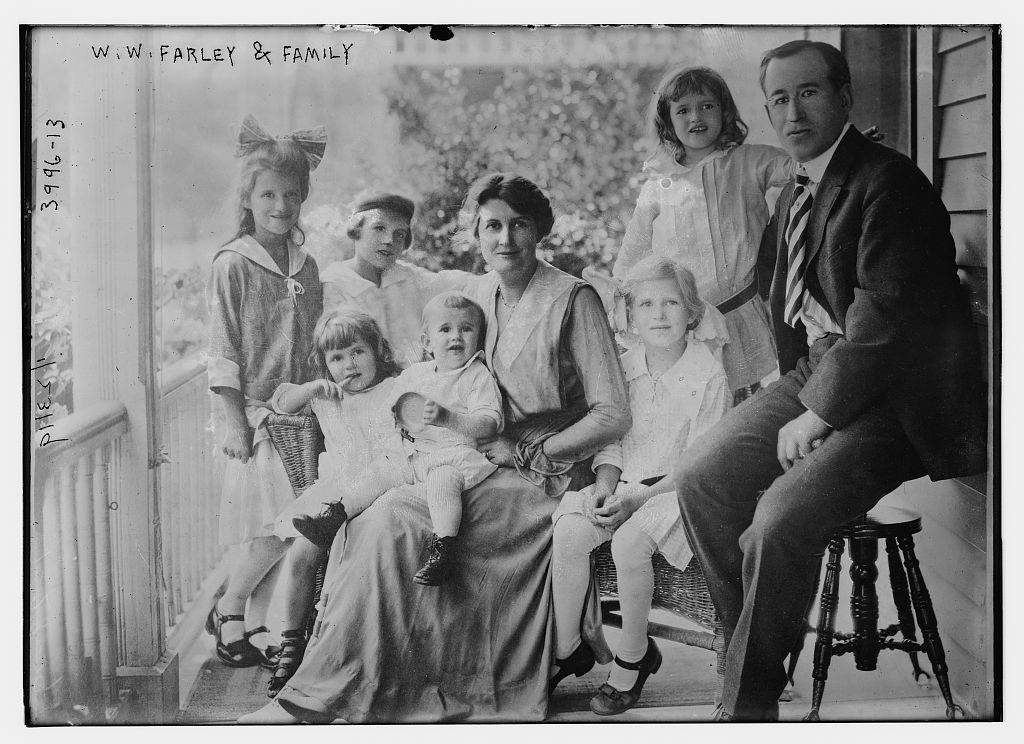
- Born: June 4, 1874; Binghamton, New York
- Died: May 21, 1952 (aged 77); Albany Hospital; Albany, New York
- Education: Cornell University
- Spouse: Marie Helena Brown Crowe (1882-1934)
- Parent(s): William Farley (1836-1905); Bridget Isabella O'Dea

William Wallace Farley (June 4, 1874 - May 21, 1952) was an American lawyer and politician who was the chairman of the New York State Democratic Party from 1919 to 1921.

== Biography ==
He was born in Binghamton, New York on June 4, 1874, to William Farley (1836-1905) and Bridget Isabella O'Dea. He attended Cornell University. He was admitted to the bar in 1900. On November 11, 1903 he married Marie Helena Brown Crowe (1882-1934). He was Chair of the Broome County Democratic Party in 1910. He was a delegate to the Democratic National Convention for New York, 1912, 1920, 1924. He was the unsuccessful candidate for New York Attorney General in 1916. He was the New York State Democratic Party chairman from 1919 to 1921. He died at Albany Hospital in Albany, New York on May 21, 1952. He was buried in Saint Augustine's Cemetery in Brackney, Pennsylvania.
