= George W. Lay =

American politician

Member of the U.S. House of Representatives from New York's 29th district
- In office March 4, 1833 – March 3, 1837
- Preceded by: Phineas L. Tracy
- Succeeded by: William Patterson

Personal details
- Born: George Washington Lay; July 26, 1780 Catskill, New York, U.S.
- Died: October 25, 1860 (aged 80) Batavia, New York, U.S.

George Washington Lay (July 26, 1798 – October 21, 1860) was an American politician and diplomat who served as a U.S. representative from New York and charge d'affaires to Sweden.

Born in Catskill, New York, Lay pursued classical studies and graduated in 1817 from Hamilton College in Clinton, New York. He studied law with Phineas L. Tracy, attained admission to the bar in 1820, and commenced practice in Batavia, New York as Tracy's partner. Lay served as Treasurer of Genesee County from 1825 to 1831.

He was elected as an Anti-Masonic Party candidate to the Twenty-third Congress and reelected as an Anti-Jacksonian to the Twenty-fourth Congress (March 4, 1833 – March 3, 1837). In 1835 he received the honorary degree of Master of Arts from Yale University.

Lay later became a Whig and served as a member of the New York State Assembly in 1840. He was Charge D'Affaires to Sweden from May 12, 1842, to October 29, 1845.

He died in Batavia on October 21, 1860. He was interred in Batavia Cemetery.

== Sources ==
- United States Congress. "George W. Lay (id: L000150)". Biographical Directory of the United States Congress.

U.S. House of Representatives
Preceded by Phineas L. Tracy	New York's 29th congressional district March 4, 1833 – March 3, 1837	Succeeded by William Patterson
Diplomatic posts
Preceded by Christopher Hughes	U.S. Minister to Sweden; May 12, 1842 – October 29, 1845	Succeeded by Henry W. Ellsworth
