= Walter A. Lynch =

American politician

Walter Lynch
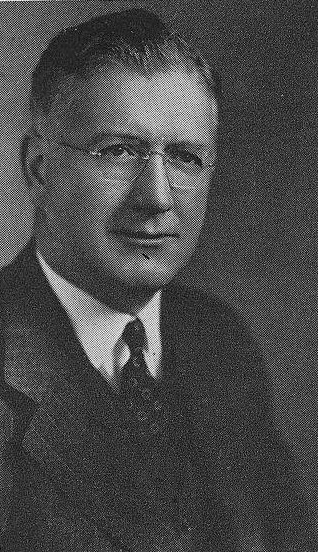

Member of the U.S. House of Representatives from New York
- In office February 20, 1940 – January 3, 1951
- Preceded by: Edward W. Curley
- Succeeded by: Sidney A. Fine
- Constituency: 22nd district (1940–1945); 23rd district (1945–1951)

Personal details
- Born: July 7, 1894 New York City, U.S.
- Died: September 10, 1957 (aged 63) New York City, U.S.
- Resting place: Gate of Heaven Cemetery; Hawthorne, New York, U.S.
- Education: Fordham University (BA, LLB)

Walter Aloysius Lynch (July 7, 1894 – September 10, 1957) was an American lawyer and politician from New York. From 1940 to 1951, he served six terms in the U.S. House of Representatives as a Democrat.

== Early life ==
Lynch attended Fordham Preparatory School and subsequently graduated from Fordham University in 1915, followed by Fordham Law School in 1918, afterwards practicing law in New York City.

== Career ==
Lynch served as a temporary New York City magistrate in 1930. He was a delegate to New York's state constitutional convention in 1938.

=== Congressman ===
He was first elected to the 76th United States Congress in a special election to fill the vacancy caused by the death of Edward W. Curley, and was re-elected to the 77th, 78th, 79th, 80th, and 81st U.S. Congresses, in total serving from February 20, 1940, to January 3, 1951.

Lynch was a delegate to the Democratic National Conventions of 1944 and 1948.

=== Candidate for governor ===
In 1950, Lynch was the Democratic nominee for governor of New York, but was defeated in a landslide by incumbent Thomas E. Dewey.

=== Later career ===
In 1952, Lynch served as chairman of the New York State Democratic Committee. Lynch was elected to the New York Supreme Court in 1954, and served from January 1955 until his death.

== Family ==
Lynch married Claire Rosemary Mitchell (1895–1985) in 1920. They were the parents of sons Walter A. Lynch Jr. (1921–2017) and John Joseph Lynch (1928–1995).

== Death and burial ==
Lynch died at his summer home in Belle Harbor, Queens. He was buried at Gate of Heaven Cemetery in Hawthorne, New York.

== Sources ==
- United States Congress. "Walter A. Lynch (id: L000537)". Biographical Directory of the United States Congress.
- Walter A. Lynch at The Political Graveyard

U.S. House of Representatives
Preceded by Edward W. Curley	Member of the U.S. House of Representatives from New York's 22nd congressional district 1940–1945	Succeeded by Adam Clayton Powell Jr.
Preceded by Charles A. Buckley	Member of the U.S. House of Representatives from New York's 23rd congressional district 1945–1951	Succeeded by Sidney A. Fine
Party political offices
Preceded by James M. Mead	Democratic Nominee for Governor of New York; 1950	Succeeded by W. Averell Harriman
