= Smith College Relief Unit =

The Smith College Relief Unit (SCRU) was a group of Smith College alumnae who aided in humanitarian relief work in France during and after the First World War. Funded by the Smith College Alumnae Association, the SCRU worked throughout the war serving under both the American Fund for French Wounded (AFFW) and later under the American Red Cross. The Unit was founded in 1917 by Harriet Boyd Hawes (1871-1945) who acted as the Unit's first director.

== Founding ==
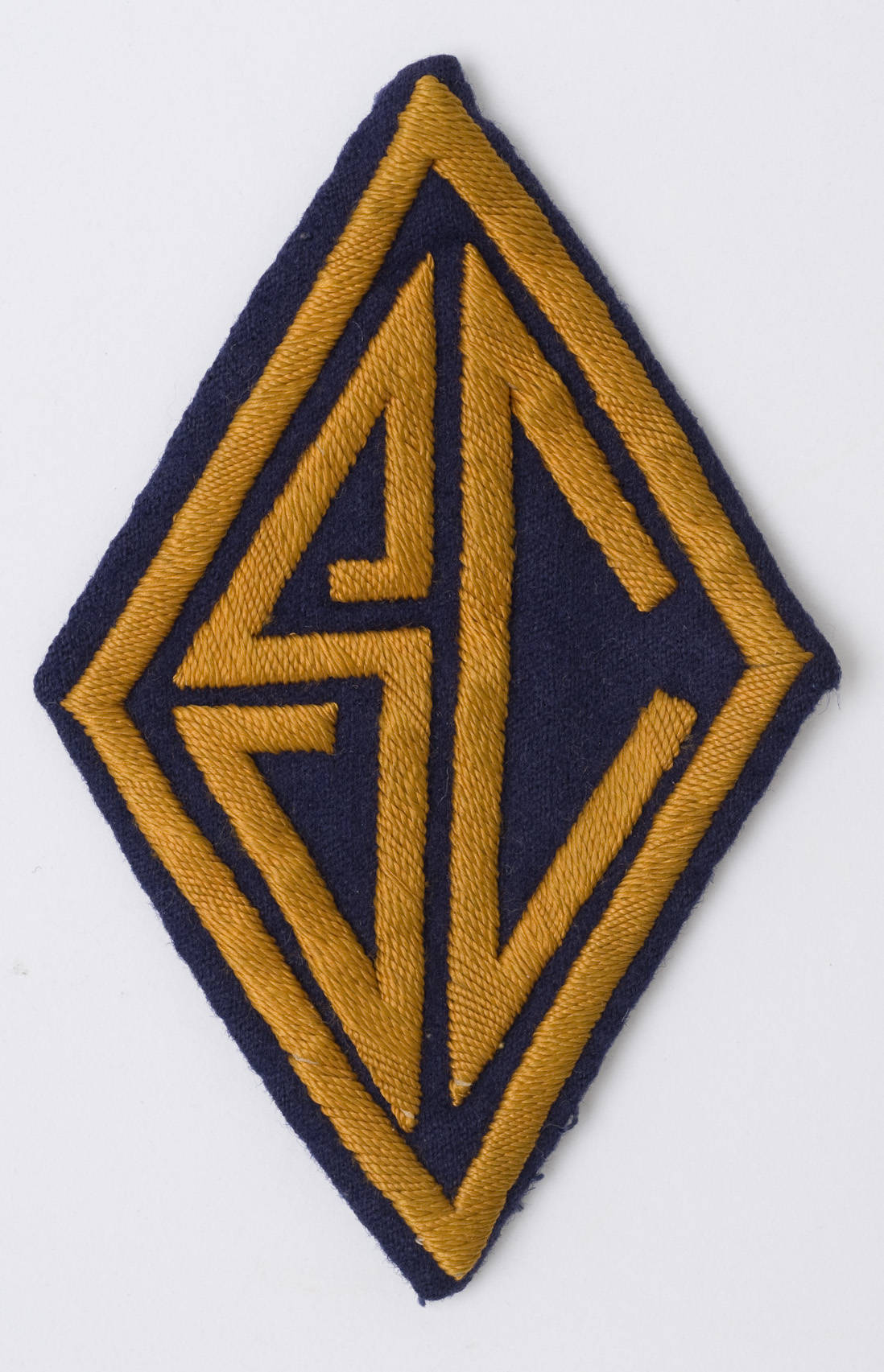
Photograph of a Smith College Relief Unit uniform patch circa 1918

In 1916, on a return trip from Greece, Harriet Boyd Hawes, Smith College Class of 1892, witnessed the destitute state in which France found itself. The German war machine had desolated the French countryside in its wake leaving France in dire need of humanitarian aid. Once she returned to the United States, she already had a plan to bring together a group of Smith alumnae to travel to northern France and aid the American Fund for French Wounded (AFFW) in their reconstruction project.

Harriet Boyd Hawes proposed a Smith College Relief Unit to the Boston chapter of the Smith College Alumnae Association on April 10, 1917. In June of the same year both the Alumnae Association of Boston and New York approved the plan and the Boston club alone pledged $4200 to the cause. The goals when founding the Relief Unit were twofold: to aid France in reconstruction after German occupation, and to create a tradition of humanitarian work done by women's colleges in general and Smith in particular.

In September 1917, eighteen Smith women departed for France to begin their work.

== Grecourt Period ==
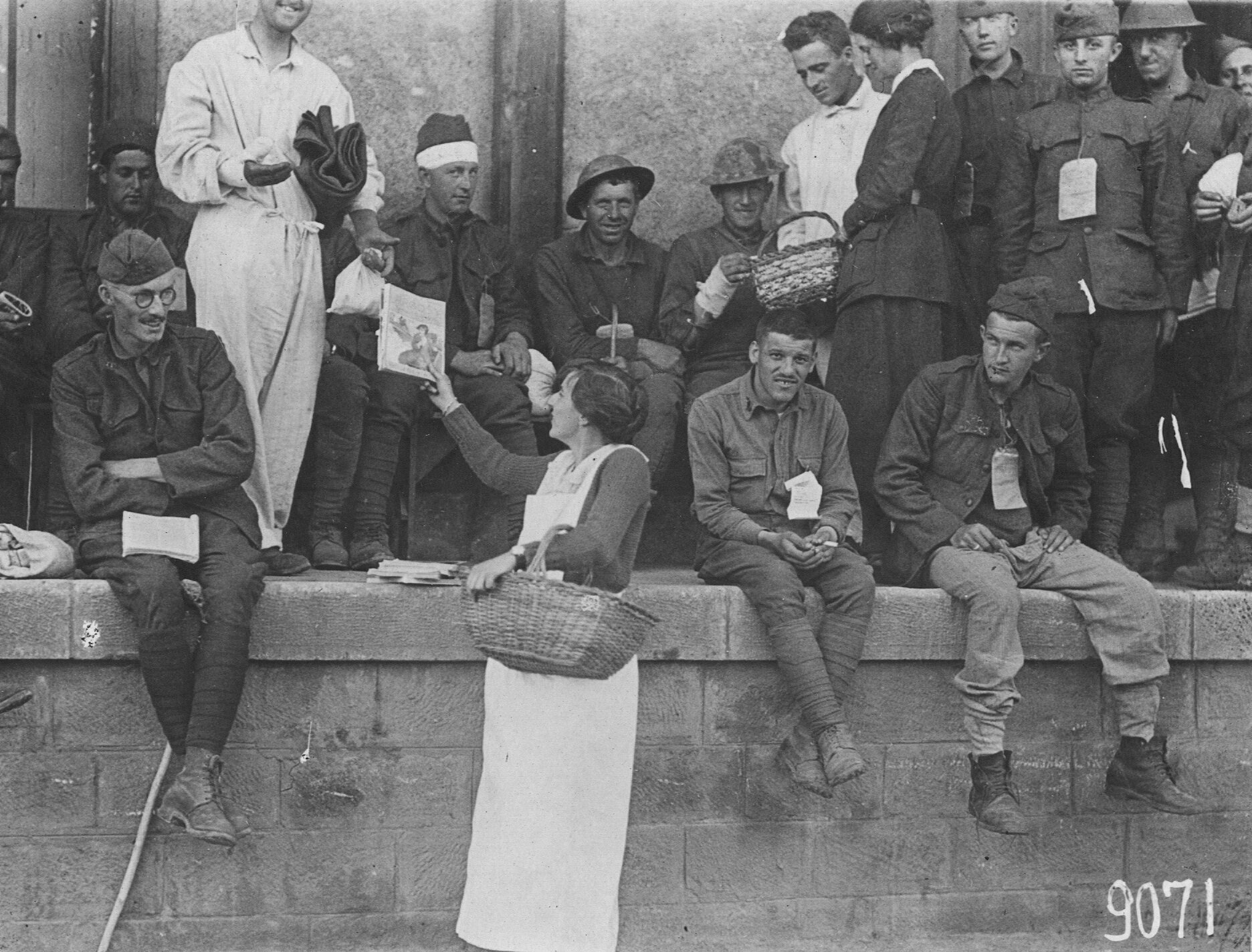
Members of the Smith College Relief Unit assisting soldiers in Chateau-Thierry, France

From September 1917 until March 1918 the Smith College Relief Unit was based in Grécourt, France in Chateau de Robecourt. They served sixteen villages throughout the Somme Region, an area of France that was particularly in need of aid since the German line had just receded. During their time in Grécourt, they built a library, a school, and a hospital, planted fruit trees, vegetables, and wheat, sold household goods at subsidized prices, and provided medical services.

== Post Ludendorff Offensive ==
In the period after the Ludendorff Offensive, the Unit was forced to flee the Somme and so the members of the unit split. Some went to join the American Red Cross with their work in Beauvais, while others fled south to drive ambulances or work for the American Committee for Devastated France. It was at this point that other members of the unit, having finished their required terms with the Unit, returned to the United States.

== Notable members ==
- Dorothy Sears Ainsworth
- Harriet Bliss Ford
- Ruth Gaines-Shelton
- Anna Maria Gove
- Harriet Boyd Hawes
- Elizabeth Cutter Morrow (committee member)
- Georgia Willis Read
- Alice Weld Tallant
- Helen Rand Thayer
