= Alice Weld Tallant =

American physician

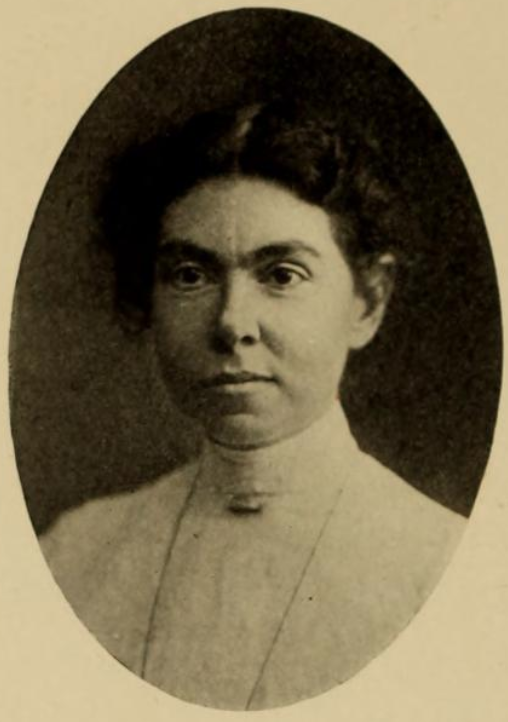
- Alice Weld Tallant, from the 1911 yearbook of the Woman's Medical College of Pennsylvania
- Born: July 14, 1875; Boston, Massachusetts
- Died: May 31, 1958 (aged 82)
- Occupations: Physician, medical school professor
- Known for: Croix de Guerre (1918)

Alice Weld Tallant (July 14, 1875 – May 31, 1958) was an American physician and medical school professor. When her employment as a professor of obstetrics was terminated at the Woman's Medical College of Pennsylvania, it sparked the "Tallant Affair", in which students staged a strike and several colleagues resigned their positions in protest.

== Early life and education ==
Alice "Elsie" Weld Tallant was born in Boston, the daughter of Henry Pinkham Tallant and Mary Gardner Tallant. She graduated from Smith College in 1897, and earned her medical degree at Johns Hopkins University in 1902, with further training at the Massachusetts Institute of Technology, Harvard Medical School, in New York and in Berlin.

== Career ==
Tallant was an intern at the New England Hospital for Women and Children from 1902 to 1905. She lectured on hygiene at Bates College from 1904 to 1905. During World War I, she went to France as one of the directors of the Smith College Relief Unit, and later worked with Anne Morgan in the American Committee for Devastated France, treating influenza among war refugees; her service earned her a Croix de Guerre in 1918.

From 1905 to 1923, Tallant was a professor of obstetrics at the Woman's Medical College of Pennsylvania, and was a practicing obstetrician at Woman's Hospital of Philadelphia from 1905 until her death in 1958. When her reappointment at the medical college was refused without public explanation in 1923, students went on a strike, alumnae presented a petition in support of Tallant, and several of her colleagues, including Ruth Webster Lathrop, resigned in protest. This controversy is recalled in school history as the "Tallant Affair".

Tallant was an obstetrician at Philadelphia General Hospital from 1922 to 1928. From 1928 to 1938, she was a social worker and physician at the Joy Settlement. From 1906 to 1950, she was a physician on staff at the Girls' House of Refuge. She served on the executive committee of the American Child Hygiene Association. She was the author of A Text-book of Obstetrical Nursing (1922).

== Publications ==
- "Some Observations on the Occurrence of Broadbent's Sign" (1904)
- "An Obstetric Anomaly" (1908)
- "The Question of Scholarships" (1911)
- "A Study of Ophthalmia in the New-born: With Nine Charts" (1912)
- "'Pre-natal Care' as Conducted in the College Hospital" (1916)
- "The Pros and Cons of Accouchement Forcé in Placenta Previa" (1917)
- A Text-book of Obstetrical Nursing (1922)
- "A Study of the Results in Face Presentations" (1923)

== Personal life ==
Tallant died in 1958. There is a small collection of her papers in the Smith College Archives. The papers of the Smith College Relief Unit include materials related to Tallant's World War I experiences.
