= American Fund for French Wounded =

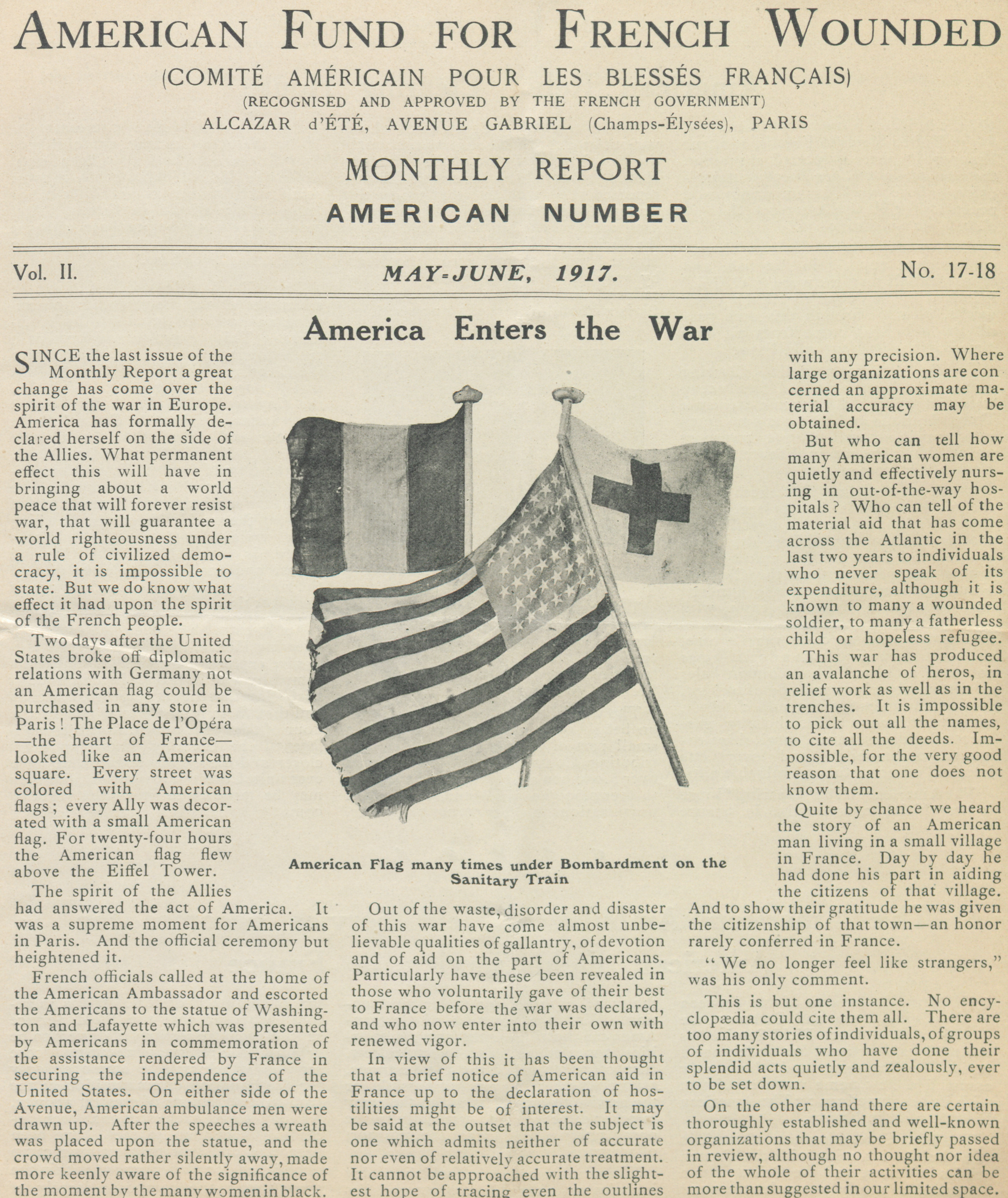
AFFW Monthly Report, May–June 1917

The American Fund for French Wounded (AFFW) was a private military relief organization founded by American women living abroad that provided aid to small hospitals in France, medical assistance for wounded French soldiers and civilians, and support for refugees during World War I. Headquartered in New York City, committees across the United States raised funds and collected dressings, blankets, pillows, clothing, food, and amusements for the organization. The AFFW worked closely with several similar organizations, including the American Red Cross.

== History ==
The AFFW was formed in Paris in the autumn of 1915 by members of the Paris Depot of the London-based French Wounded Emergency Fund who sought autonomy from the London leadership in order to concentrate on providing aid to the French war effort. Isabel Stevens Lathrop was a founder and president of the AFFW, and chaired the organization's Paris depot. Letters written by Lathrop to a donor during her Paris work are in the American Fund for French Wounded collection, Yale University Library.

Anne Morgan served as the AFFW’s United States-based Treasurer and Anne Murray Dike, Chairman of the AFFW’s Civilian Committee.

The original work of the AFFW was confined to sending supplies to emergency hospitals in France and later expanded to re-establishing the destroyed communities of the region. The AFFW ran a women's volunteer motor corps out of Paris that carried supplies to hospitals throughout France and created temporary depots in small villages. Drivers usually performed their own maintenance work. Volunteers in the Civilian Committee lived in or near villages in northern France, making structural repairs, replanting fields, and delivering provisions and supplies. The first unit formed by the AFFW for civilian work were placed by General Petain at Blerancourt in the Aisne, in July, 1917. Ten American women settled amongst the ruins of the town and organized a community center which included the supervision of twenty-five villages.

The American Committee for Devastated France represented a continuation of the Civilian Division of the AFFW, whose members were dissatisfied with the AFFW central leadership's focus on military relief over civilian reconstruction work.

== Notable Volunteers ==
Gertrude Stein and Alice B. Toklas volunteered for the organization, driving a truck to deliver supplies to hospitals in the south of France.
