= Dorothy Sears Ainsworth =

American physical educator

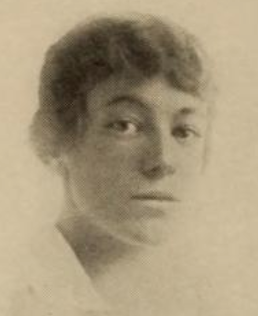
- Dorothy Sears Ainsworth, from the 1916 yearbook of Smith College
- Born: March 8, 1894; Moline, Illinois
- Died: December 2, 1976 (age 82); Moline, Illinois
- Occupation: Physical educator

Dorothy Sears Ainsworth (March 8, 1894 – December 2, 1976) was an American physical educator. She was director of physical education at Smith College from 1926 to 1960. For her international work, she was referred to as "Physical Education's First Lady of the World."

== Early life and education ==
Ainsworth was born in Moline, Illinois, the daughter of Harry Ainsworth and Stella Davidson Ainsworth. She graduated from Smith College in 1916. She earned a master's degree in 1925, and completed doctoral studies at Teachers College, Columbia University in 1930. She also studied dance with Margaret H'Doubler at the University of Wisconsin in the summer of 1922, with further dance training in Denmark, Germany, and Austria.

== Career ==
Ainsworth taught high school in Moline immediately after college. She went to France with the Smith College Relief Unit during World War I, and served in Grécourt. She also taught one year at Skidmore College.

She was director of physical education at Smith College beginning in 1926. She taught dance classes and coached basketball. She oversaw an expansion in the college's facilities for sports, and the creation of graduate teacher training courses in physical education. She became a full professor in 1937, and retired with emerita status in 1960. She was president of the Association of Directors of Physical Education for Women, and of the Eastern Association for Physical Education of College Women.

Ainsworth was especially active in international work on women's physical education. In 1949, she chaired the first International Congress on Physical Education and Sports for Girls and Women, held in Copenhagen, which led to the founding of the International Association of Physical Education and Sport for Girls and Women (IAPESGW). From 1950 to 1957, she chaired the United States Joint Council on International Affairs in Health, Physical Education and Recreation. She also chaired committees of the World Confederation of Organizations of the Teaching Profession, and the Pan American Institute of Physical Education. In 1960, she represented the United States at the 75th anniversary celebrations at the University of Natal in South Africa.

In 1948, Ainsworth was elected as Fellow #72 in the prestigious American Academy of Physical Education (now known as the National Academy of Kinesiology). In 1960, she was awarded the Luther A. Gulick Medal from the American Association for Health, Physical Education and Recreation. In 1962, she received the National Academy of Kinesiology's highest honor, the Hetherington Award. In 1968, she received the Woman of Conscience Award from the National Council of Women of the United States, and in 1974 she was given the Presidential Service Award by the American Alliance for Health, Physical Education and Recreation. She was also decorated by the French, Finnish, Danish, and Swedish governments, and by the Emperor of Japan.

== Publications ==
- The History of Physical Education in Colleges for Women (1930)
- Individual Sports for Women (1943)
- Basic Rhythms (1955, with Ruth Evans)

== Personal life and legacy ==
Ainsworth died in 1976, at the age of 82. She left her Northampton home to Smith College. There is a large collection of her papers at Smith. The Smith College Class of 1916 established a Dorothy Sears Ainsworth Scholarship Award. The IAPESGW offers a Dorothy Sears Ainsworth Research Award. In 2012 she was inducted into the Smith Pioneer Athletics Hall of Fame.
