= Harriet Ford =

Harriet Ford may refer to:

- Harriet Ford (1863–1949), American actress
- Harriet Mary Ford (1859–1938), Canadian artist
- Harriet Bliss Ford (1876–1964), American writer
