= Congress of Allied Women on War Service =

- Poster announcing the conference, designed by Neysa McMein
- Date: 21–22 August 1918
- Duration: 2 days
- Venue: Théâtre des Champs-Élysées
- Location: Paris, France
- Theme: "To improve the unparalleled opportunity of interpreting to one another the women of the nations in whose hands will rest in increasing measure the formative influences in the building of the new world. It is believed that such forces, rightly stimulated and directed will shorten the war."
- Organised by: 26 member Executive Committee chaired by Virginia Vanderbilt
- Participants: Women of the Allied nations, French, British, American, Italian, Belgian, and Serbian

Congress of Allied Women on War Service (Congrès des Femmes alliées au service des œuvres de guerre) was a mass meeting of women on War Service. It was held in the Théâtre des Champs-Élysées of Paris, France, on 22 August 1918. Two thousand Allied women engaged in War Service were in attendance. The Lyceum Club, on Rue de Penthièvre, branch of the London Lyceum, became headquarters of the Congress, and the environment suggested that an Inter-Allied Club for the Alliees might be the result of the movement.

These women of the Allied nations, French, British, American, Italian, Belgian, and Serbian, were looking far ahead. According to their program, they met "to improve the unparalleled opportunity of interpreting to one another the women of the nations in whose hands will rest in increasing measure the formative influences in the building of the new world. It is believed that such forces, rightly stimulated and directed will shorten the war."

== Attendees ==
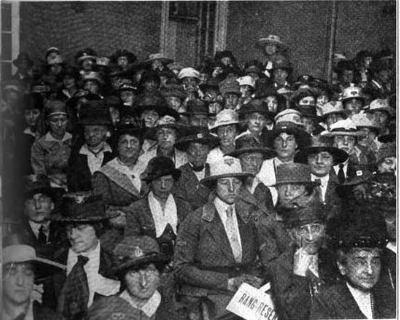

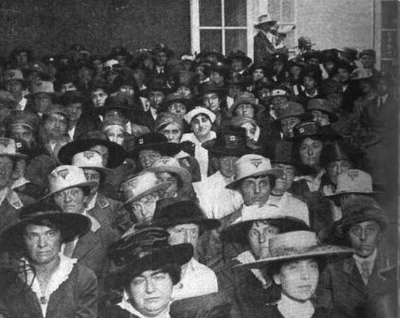
Some of the 2,000 attendees.

The Congress was to have been presided over by Georges Clemenceau, Prime Minister of France, and addressed by David Lloyd George, Prime Minister of the United Kingdom; but, the events of war interfering, it was actually presided over by Lord Derby, British Ambassador to France, and addressed by Stephen Pichon, French Foreign Minister.

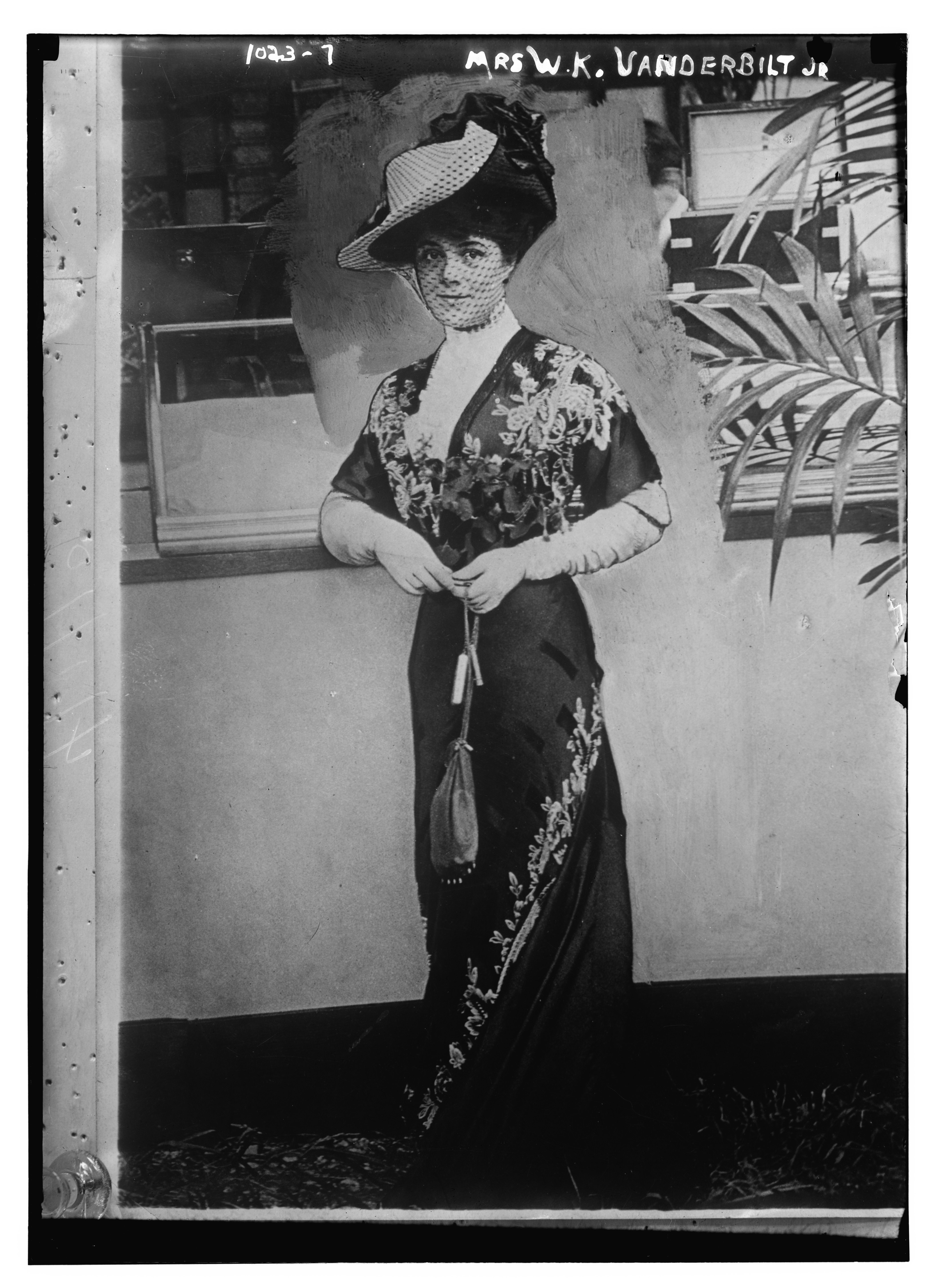
Virginia Vanderbilt, chair, Executive Committee

The executive committee was chaired by Virginia Vanderbilt and consisted of 26 members. The committee consisted of women from the three larger Allied countries, such as Julie Siegfried, Avril de Sainte-Croix, Mrs. Édouard de Billy, Comtesse d'Haussonville, Aline Poincaré Boutroux, the Marchioness of Hartington, Miss Ethel Knight, Comtesse Helene Goblet d'Alviella, Mildred Barnes Bliss, Edith Wharton, Isabel Stevens Lathrop, and Edith Roosevelt. Irene Headley Armes, Mary Dingman, and Mary George White were from the American YWCA

The conference included 102 different women's societies for war service. There were women present officially representing the nations at war: British, French, American, as well as Belgian, Italian, Romanian, Polish, Serbian, and Montenegrin. Russia was represented as the women of the world did not bar their Russian counterparts from the association of the free. Others included women from the Republics of South America, Asia, and Africa. Women war workers from the American YWCA, the American Red Cross, YMCA, and the American French Fund for Wounded, made up about three-fourths of the assembly according to the Paris Herald.

Edith Balfour Lyttelton, representing the Women's Land Army, Dame Katherine Furze of the W. R. E. N., Katharine Stewart-Murray, Duchess of Atholl of the British Red Cross, and Ray Strachey of the British Women's labor movement were part of the British delegation. The British Blue Triangle was represented by Alexandrina McArthur “Rena” Carswell Datta (1886–1978), the Marchioness of Hartington and Miss Ethel Knight.

The 75 American YWCA secretaries in their blue gray uniforms were present to represent the women of the United States who sent them to France. Delegates from about one hundred other organizations were present. Janet Wallace Emrich, of Berkeley, California told of the spirit of cooperation shown by all the women in war work at the Congress, and of the gratitude that the French in particular felt toward the women of the U.S.

== Activities ==
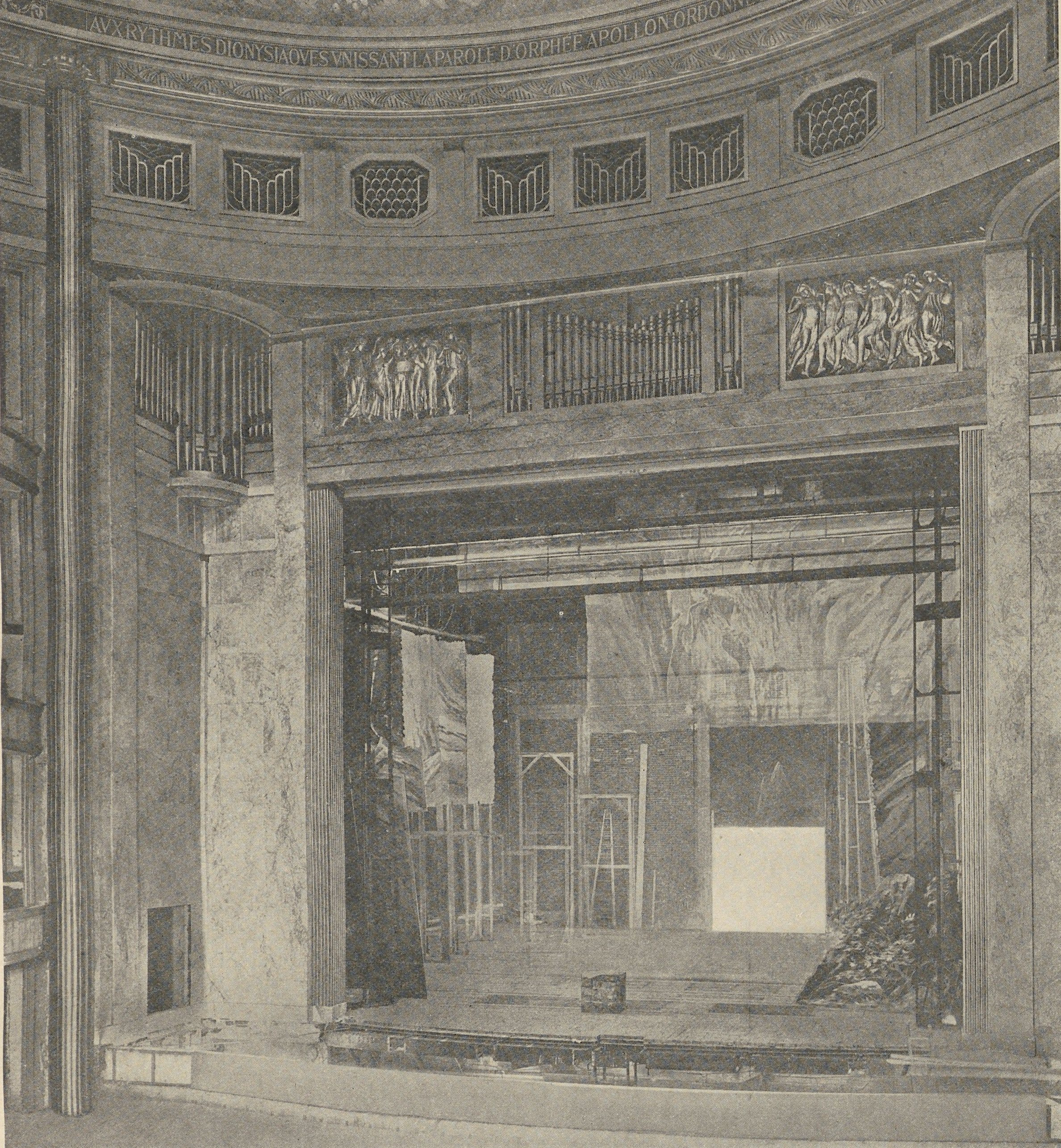
Theatre Champs Elysees, 1914

An elaborate ceremony occurred on 21 August 1918 at the Théâtre des Champs-Élysées.

On 22 August, as Lord Derby, British Ambassador to France, who presided, read the roll call of organizations, each delegation rose en masse. The two thousand women, led by an American colored regimental band rose and sang, in French and English, "The Battle Hymn of the Republic". The war program of the French women was reviewed at the conference. A French woman, who wished that her country, her Government, might be wiser, said to the executive committee:— "If you can get the French Government back of this movement, you will have accomplished the liberation of the women of France; a new era will begin for them." Émile Boutroux, one of the leading feminists of France, spoke about aligning French women with the women of the rest of the world. French women realized that day, perhaps for the first time, the power of women. Lyttelton stated that women may have done much, but they purpose to do more. She read a message from President Woodrow Wilson, and then outlined the great purpose of the women war workers, that of establishing a greater sympathy and an ever stronger union between all Allied women.

Other activities included a dinner at the Hotel Quai d'Orsay, attended by five hundred Allied women. At the conclusion of the Congress, two thousand women scattered around Paris.

== Legacy ==
It was agreed by the executive committee of the Congress of Allied Women on War Service that the following be sent to the women of the allied nations. The message was signed, on behalf of the executive committee, by Carswell.

The women on war service in France greet their coworkers in the allied countries. Our highest purpose must be—

To stand united behind the armies.
To render any service that will release a man for fighting the enemy.
To fill any gap.
To form a wall of endeavor as solid as that of our soldiers.
To strengthen them as they protect us, and so to hasten victory and a lasting peace.

To the women who wait, we send a special greeting of respect. The courage with which they bear the heavy burden of their anxiety and the monotony of standing by, guides us on our way. Carry on, women on war service at home and abroad, all of us together; carry on!

== Archives ==
Planning meetings occurred on August 3 and 7, 1918. The Minutes from those meetings of the executive committee are held by the Bliss Archives, Harvard University Archives.

== See also ==
- Women in World War I
