= Théâtre des Champs-Élysées =

Theatre in Paris, France

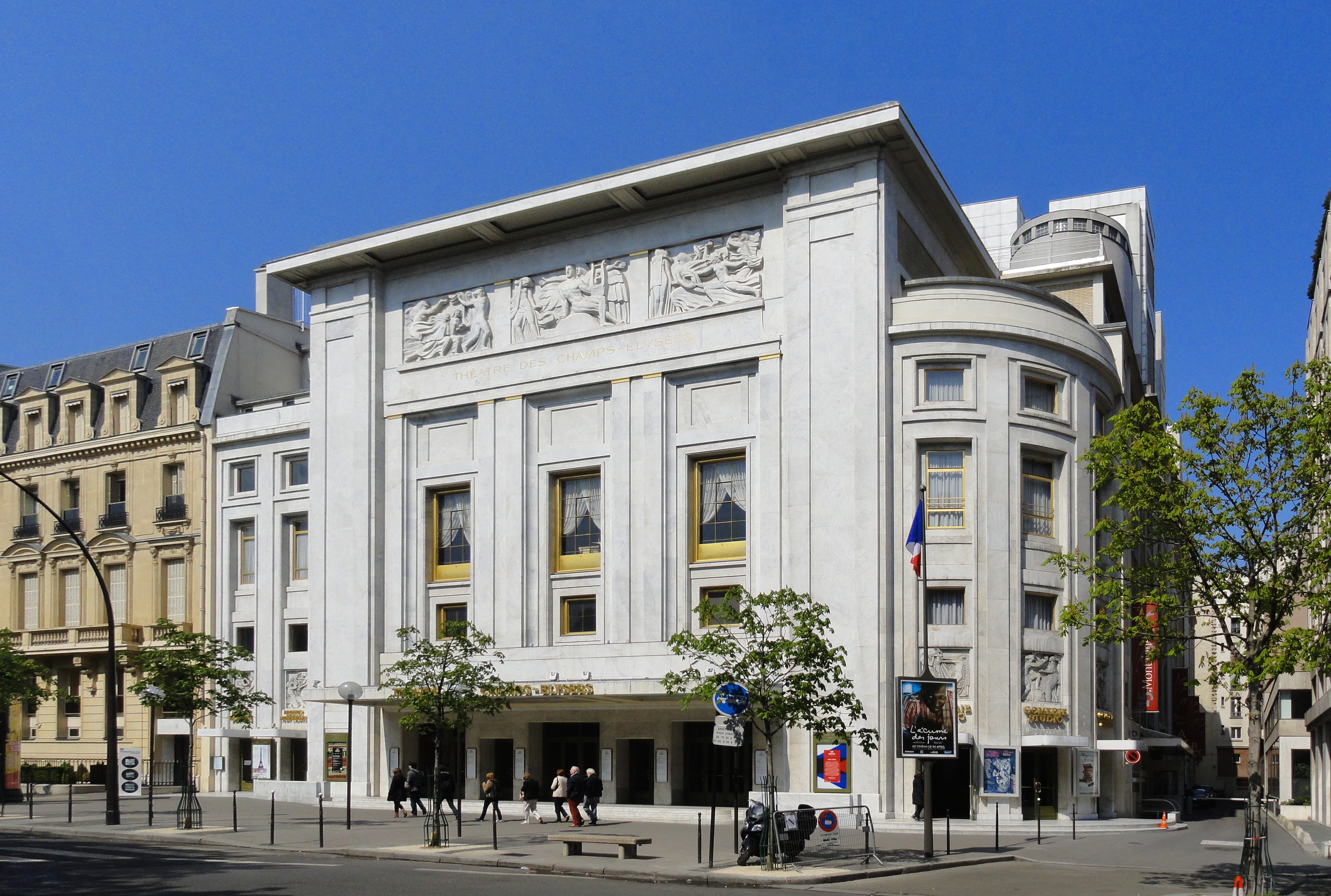
- View of Théâtre des Champs-Élysées from avenue Montaigne, with visible bas-reliefs by Antoine Bourdelle
- Interactive map of Théâtre des Champs-Élysées
- Coordinates: 48°51′57″N 02°18′11″E
- Owner: Caisse des Dépôts et Consignations
- Capacity: 1,905 (Théâtre), 601 (Comédie), 230 (Studio)
- Type: Theatre, concert hall, opera house
- Public transit: Alma–Marceau, Franklin D. Roosevelt, Pont de l'Alma, 42, 63, 72, 80, 92

Construction
- Opened: 1913
- Architects: Auguste Perret; Gustave Perret; Henry van der Velde

Website
- www.theatrechampselysees.fr www.comediedeschampselysees.com

Monument historique
- Designated: 11 December 1957
- Reference no.: PA00088883

The Théâtre des Champs-Élysées (French pronunciation: [teɑtʁə de ʃɑ̃z‿elize]) is an entertainment venue standing at 15 avenue Montaigne in Paris. It is situated near Avenue des Champs-Élysées, from which it takes its name. Its eponymous main hall seats up to 1,905 people, while the smaller Comédie and Studio des Champs-Élysées, above the main hall, seat 601 and 230 people respectively.

Commissioned by impresario Gabriel Astruc, the theatre was built from 1911 to 1913 upon the designs of brothers Auguste Perret and Gustave Perret following a scheme by Henry van de Velde, and became the first example of Art Deco architecture in the city. Less than two months after its inauguration, the Théâtre hosted the world premiere of the Ballets Russes' Rite of Spring, which provoked one of the most famous classical music riots.

At present, the theatre shows about three staged opera productions a year, mostly baroque or chamber works more suited to the modest size of its stage and orchestra pit. It also houses an important concert season. It is the home venue of the Orchestre National de France and the Orchestre Lamoureux, and serves as a French base for the Vienna Philharmonic Orchestra as well.

== Architecture ==
The theatre is built of reinforced concrete and features rectangular forms, straight lines, and decoration attached to the outside on plaques of marble and stucco, which was a radical departure from the Art Nouveau style, and, at the time, shockingly plain in appearance.

The building's concrete construction was not merely a stylistic choice. Subsoil conditions and the site's proximity to the Seine made concrete necessary. Henry van de Velde was the initial architect, resigning when it was clear that the contractors, the Perret brothers, had a far deeper understanding of reinforced concrete construction than he did, although the Perrets, were not licensed architects and had another designer, Roger Bouvard, sign their plans.

The building includes an exterior bas relief by Antoine Bourdelle, a dome by Maurice Denis, paintings by Édouard Vuillard and Jacqueline Marval, and a stage curtain by Ker-Xavier Roussel. The building houses two smaller stages, the Comédie des Champs-Élysées theatre on the 3rd floor, and the Studio des Champs-Élysées on the 5th floor.

The building is considered a landmark of modern architecture, and has been a monument historique of France since 1957.

Exterior views

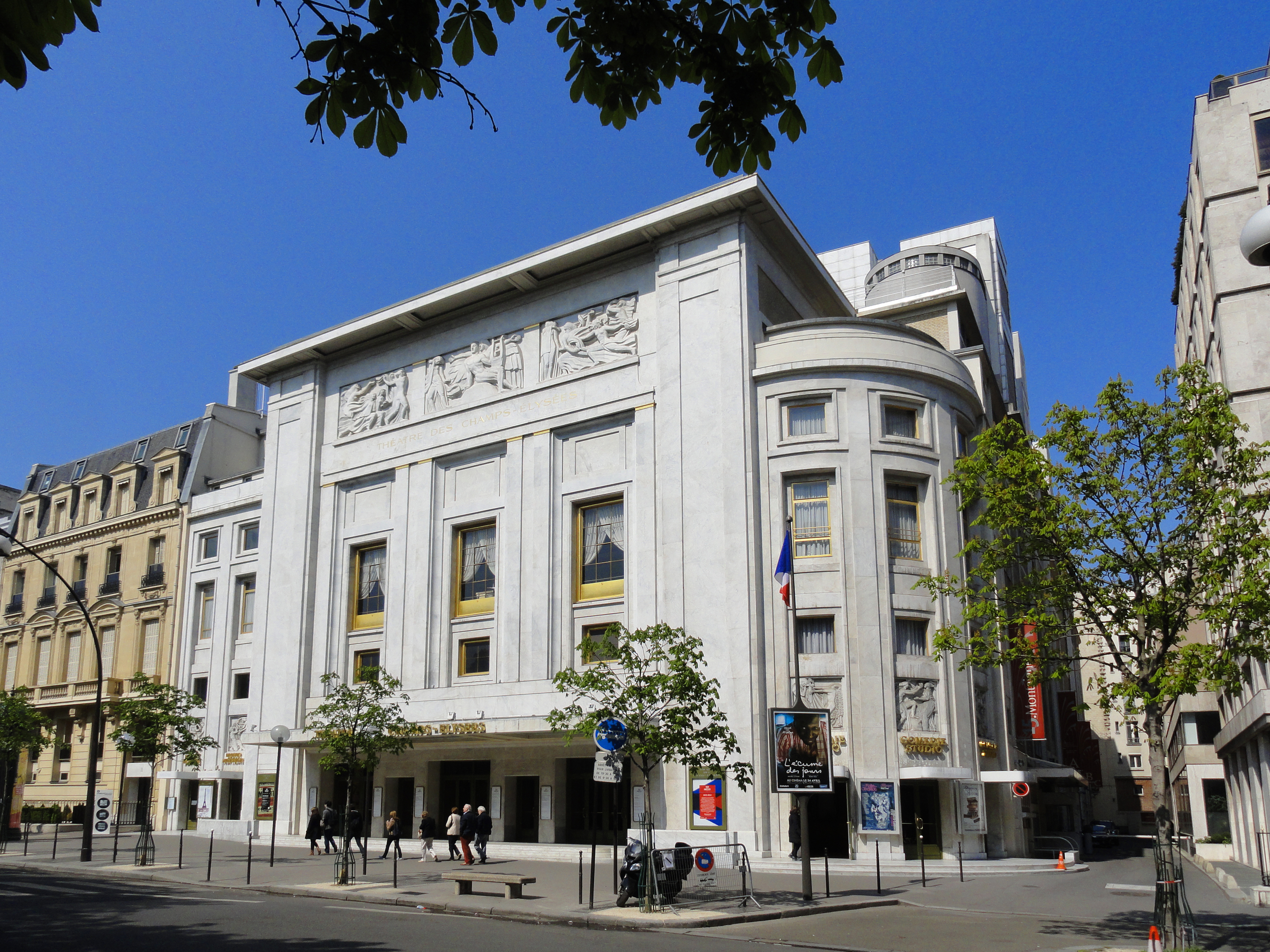
Perspective view

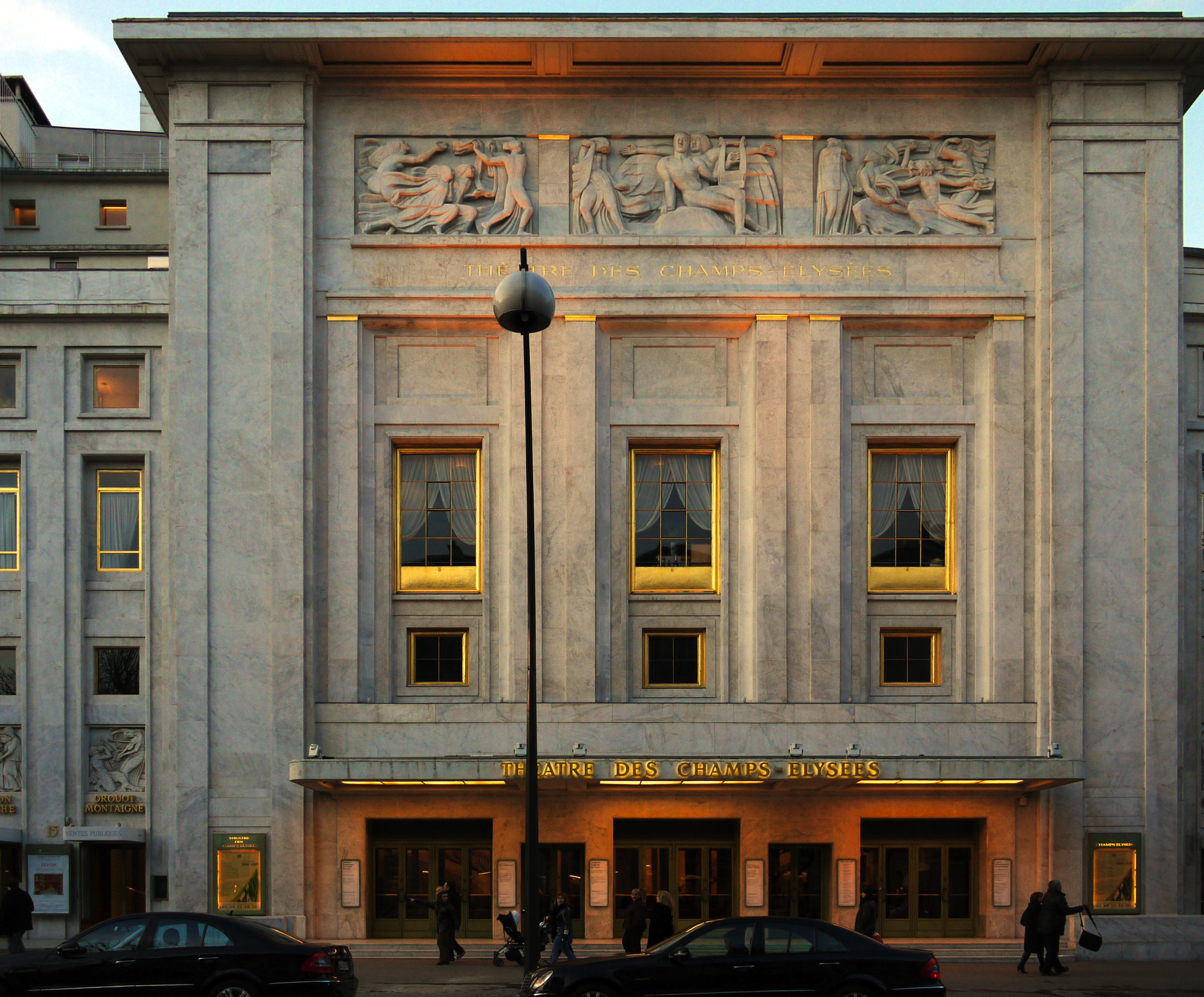
Street façade with bas-reliefs by Antoine Bourdelle
Antoine Bourdelle's sculptural reliefs

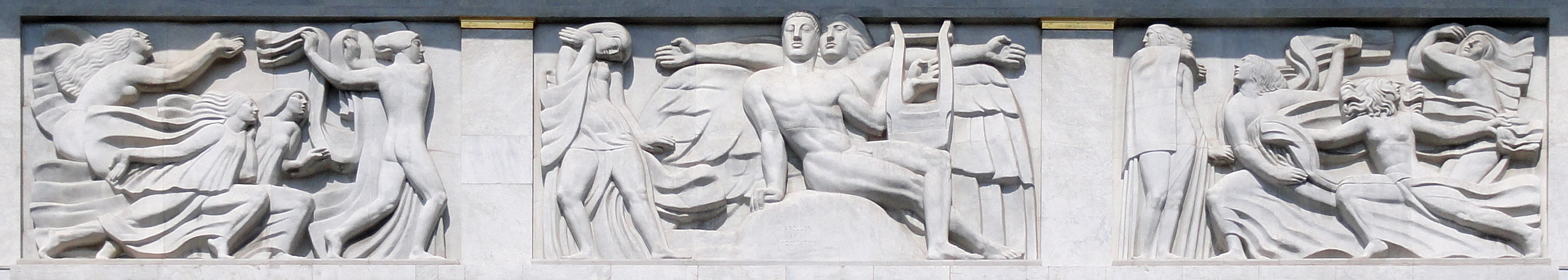
The Muses Running to Apollo and Apollo at his Meditation
Interior of the main auditorium

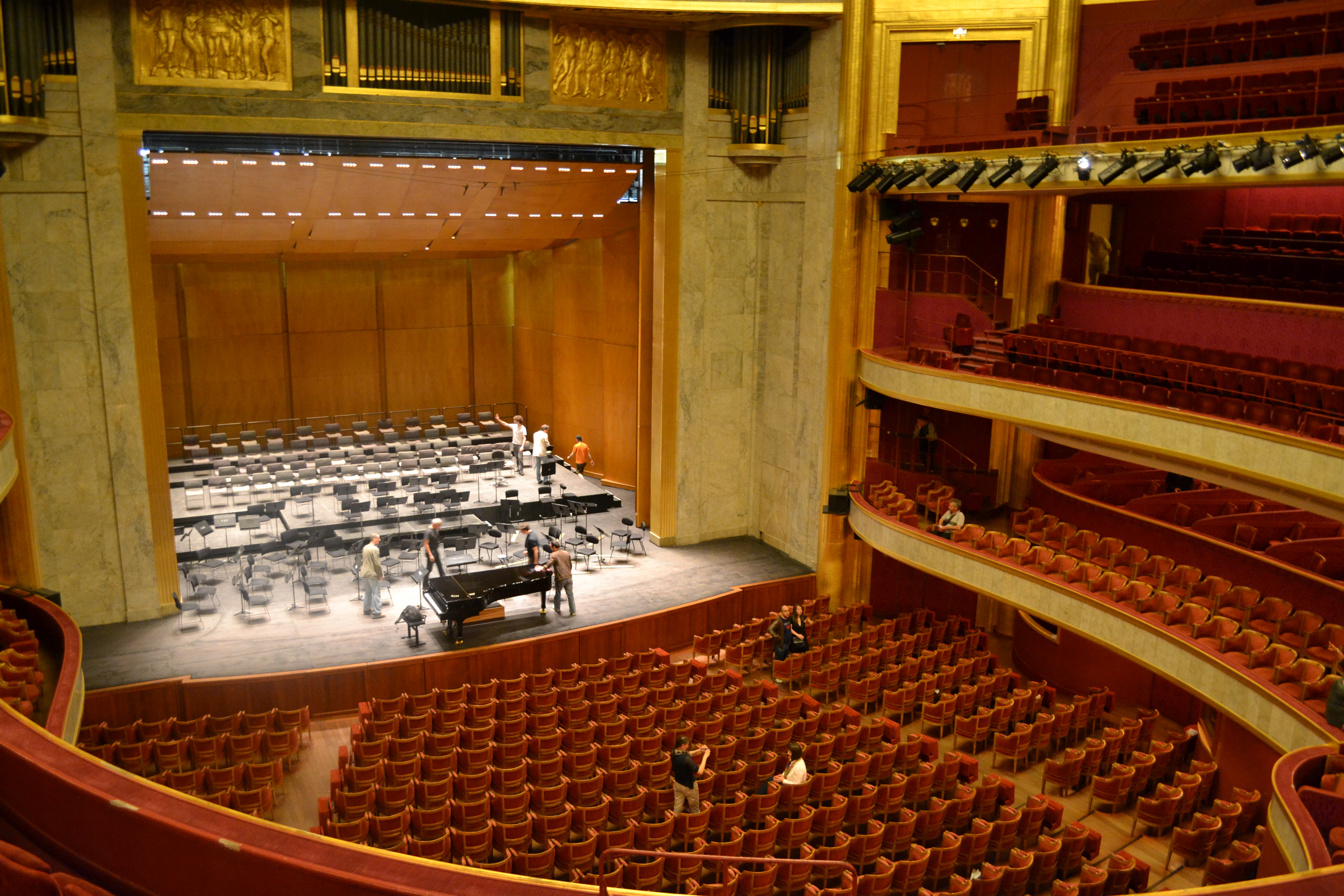
View of the auditorium and stage

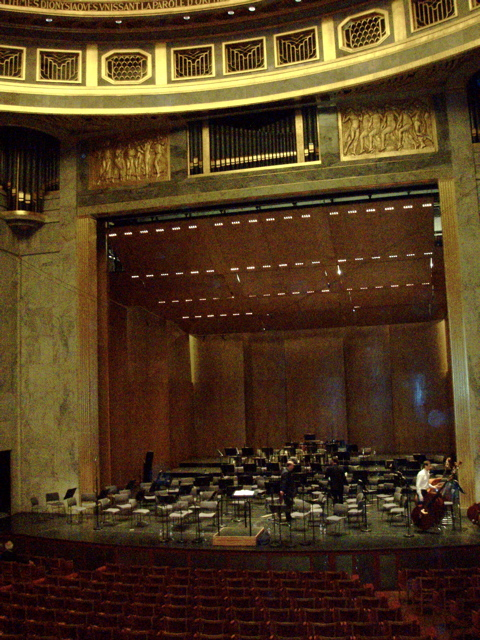
Stage

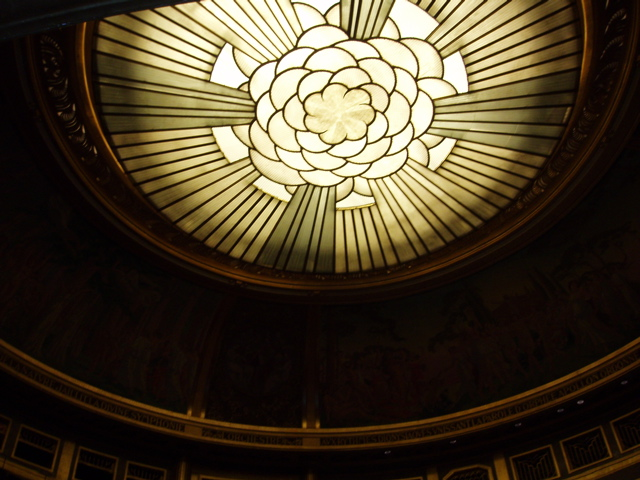
Ceiling

== Early history ==
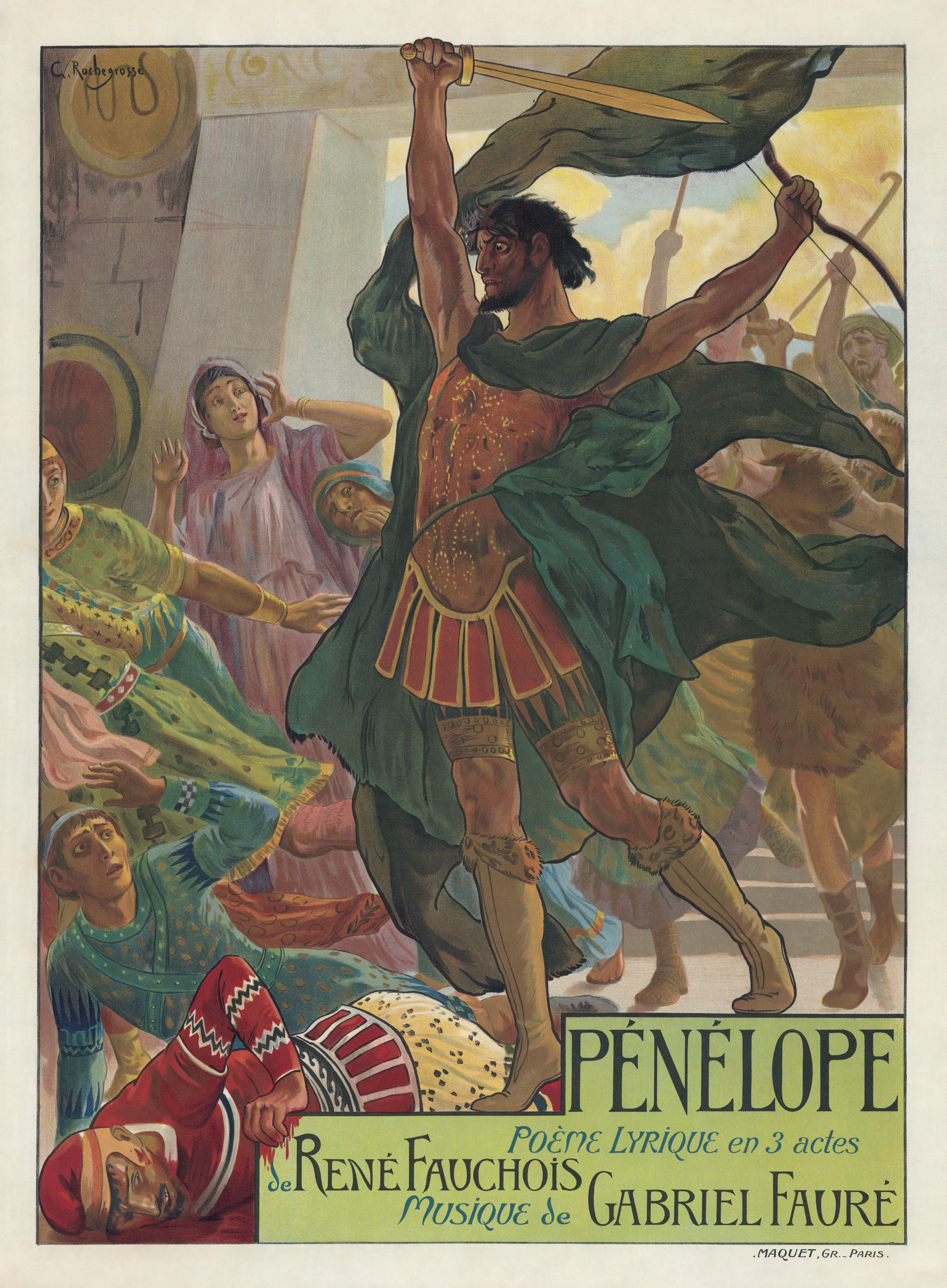
1913 Poster for Pénélope at the Théâtre des Champs-Elysées

Gabriel Astruc was the first director of the theatre, and programmed contemporary music, dance and opera, including works by Claude Debussy and Igor Stravinsky.

Although Astruc was soon financially overextended, the first season was "nothing short of dazzling." The theatre opened on 2 April 1913 with a gala concert featuring five of France's most renowned composers conducting their own works: Claude Debussy (Prélude à l'après-midi d'un faune), Paul Dukas (L'apprenti sorcier), Gabriel Fauré (La naissance de Vénus), Vincent d'Indy (Le camp from Wallenstein), and Camille Saint-Saëns (Phaéton and excerpts from his choral work La lyre et la harpe). This was followed the next day with a performance of Hector Berlioz's opera Benvenuto Cellini conducted by Felix Weingartner which included a "dance spectacular" by Anna Pavlova. Later there was a series of concerts devoted to Beethoven conducted by Weingartner and featuring the pianists Alfred Cortot and Louis Diémer, and the soprano Lilli Lehmann. The Royal Concertgebouw Orchestra of Amsterdam conducted by Willem Mengelberg gave two concerts: Beethoven's Ninth Symphony and the Paris premiere of Fauré's opera Pénélope (10 May).

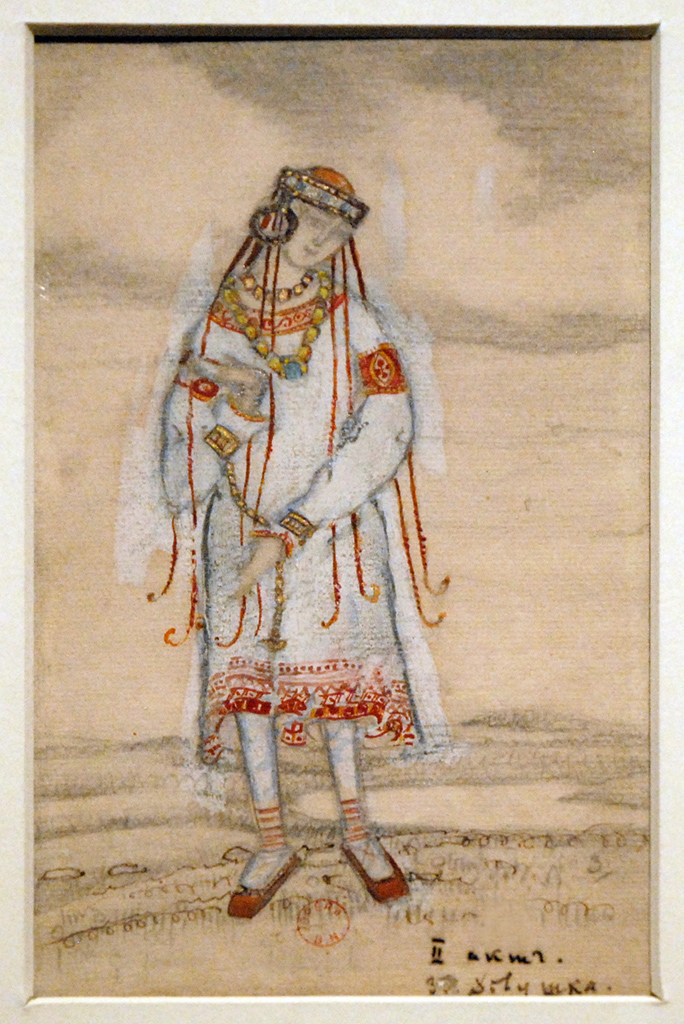
Costume design by Nicholas Roerich for the 1913 premiere of Stravinsky's The Rite of Spring

Sergei Diaghilev's Ballets Russes presented the company's fifth season, although their first in the new theatre, opening on 15 May with Igor Stravinsky's The Firebird, Nikolai Rimsky-Korsakov's Scheherazade (as choreographed by Michel Fokine), and the world premiere of Debussy's Jeux (with choreography by Vaslav Nijinsky and designs by Léon Bakst). Some in the audiences had been offended by the depiction on stage of a tennis game in Jeux, but this was nothing compared to the reaction to the ritual sacrifice in Stravinsky's Rite of Spring on 29 May. Carl Van Vechten described the scene:

A certain part of the audience was thrilled by what it considered to be a blasphemous attempt to destroy music as an art, and, swept away with wrath, began very soon after the rise of the curtain, to make cat-calls and to offer audible suggestions as to how the performance should proceed. The orchestra played unheard, except occasionally when a slight lull occurred. The young man seated behind me in the box stood up during the course of the ballet to enable himself to see more clearly. The intense excitement under which he was labouring betrayed itself presently when he began to beat rhythmically on top of my head with his fists. My emotion was so great that I did not feel the blows for some time.

Marie Rambert heard someone in the gallery call out: "Un docteur … un dentiste … deux docteurs…." The second performance (4 June) was less eventful, and, according to Maurice Ravel, the entire musical work could actually be heard.

The first season ended on 26 June 1913 with a performance of Pénélope, and the new one opened on 2 October with the same work. On 9 October d'Indy conducted Carl Maria von Weber's opera Der Freischütz. On 15 October Debussy conducted the Ibéria section from his orchestral triptych Images pour orchestre, and a week later he conducted his cantata La Damoiselle élue. By 20 November Astruc was out of money and was ejected from the theatre, and the sets and costumes were impounded. The following season consisted of operas presented by Covent Garden and the Boston Opera Company.

Poster by Neysa McMein for the Congress of Allied Women on War Service held at the theatre in August 1918.

During most of World War I, the theatre was closed, but the Congress of Allied Women on War Service was held there in August 1918. Pavlova's ballet company presented a short season of dance performances in 1919.

== Later history ==
The theatre was purchased by Madame Ganna Walska (Mrs. Harold Fowler McCormick) in 1922, although not with the intention of being its manager. She stated that she had purchased the nine-year lease from Jacques Hébertot, who would remain the manager.

In 1923 Louis Jouvet was named director of the smaller Comédie des Champs-Élysées (located upstairs, over the foyer of the main theatre). The Comédie stage was the home of Jules Romains' long-running medical satire, Dr. Knock (1923), in which Jouvet played the title role. Jouvet also staged Charles Vildrac's Madame Béliard (1925), Bernard Zimmer's Bava the African (1926), Jean Sarment's Leopold the Well-Beloved (1927), and Marcel Achard's Jean of the Moon (1929). He is perhaps best known for directing the premier of three of Jean Giraudoux's plays: Siegfried in 1928, Amphitryon 38 in 1929, and Intermezzo in 1933.

On 4 October 1923, the Théâtre des Champs-Élysées was the site of a spectacular location shoot for Marcel L'Herbier's film L'Inhumaine. More than 2,000 invited guests filled the theatre to play the audience at a fictional concert, while ten cameras recorded their reactions. George Antheil performed his own dissonant music to stir up whistles, applause, and protests before Georgette Leblanc appeared on stage. Among those present were leading artists and intellectuals of the period, including Erik Satie, Pablo Picasso, James Joyce, Ezra Pound, and the Prince of Monaco.

On 4 December 1924 the Ballets Suédois production of Francis Picabia's Relâche, described by him as a ballet instantanéist was premiered in the main theatre. The music by Erik Satie was conducted by Roger Désormière. The ballet included an interlude with a film by René Clair (shot on the roof of the theatre), which was accompanied by Saties's "new and astonishing film score Cinéma." At the conclusion of the ballet, Satie took his curtain call in Désormière's car.

Duran Duran filmed the video for New Moon On Monday here in January 1984.

== Current use ==
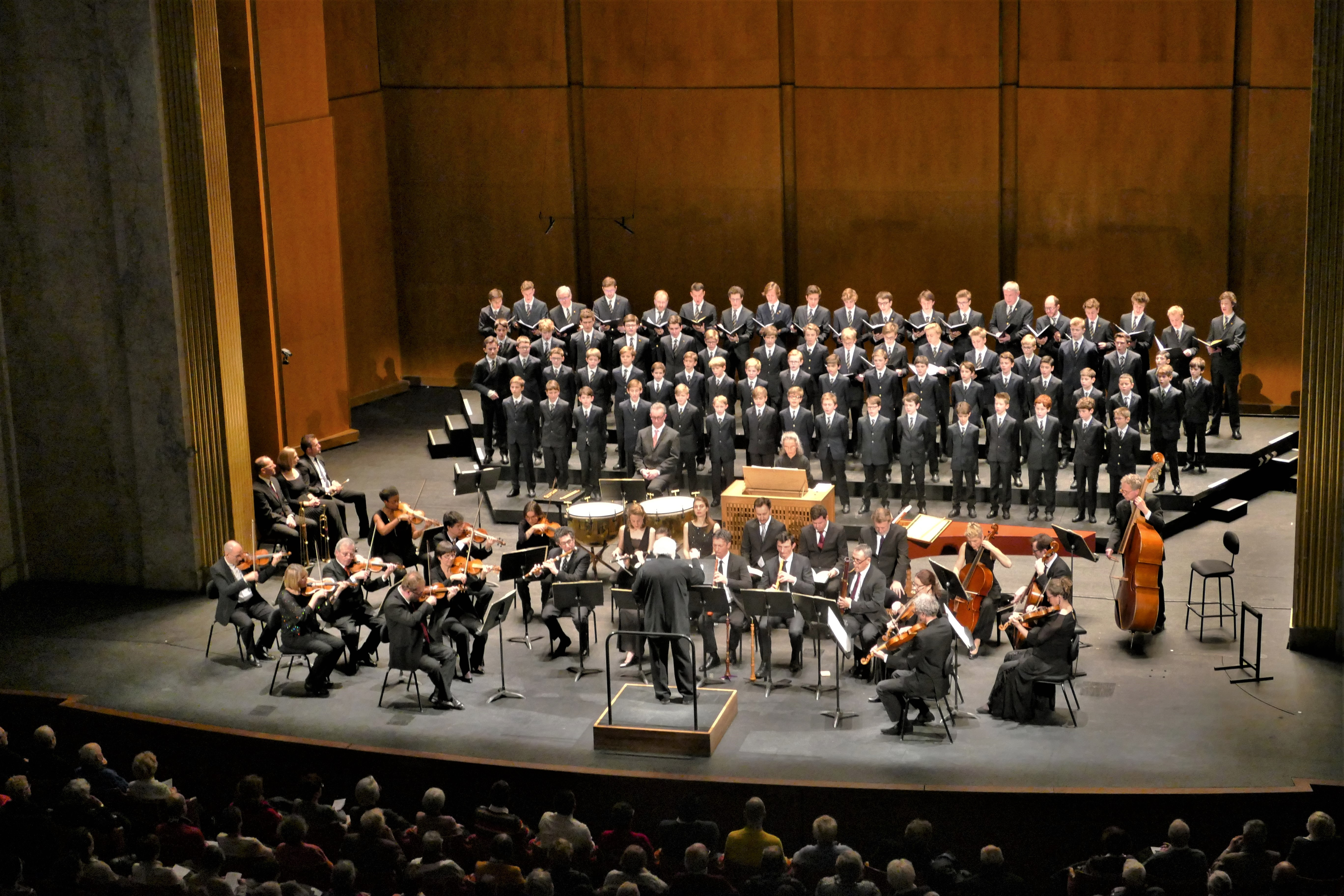
La Grande Écurie et la Chambre du Roy and the Petits chanteurs de Sainte-Croix de Neuilly perform on the main stage in 2017

The theatre shows about three staged opera productions a year, mostly baroque or chamber works, suited to the modest size of its stage and orchestra pit. In addition, it houses an important concert season. It is home to two orchestras: the Orchestre National de France and Orchestre Lamoureux, as well as the French base of the Vienna Philharmonic Orchestra. The Orchestre Philharmonique de Radio France, the Orchestre des Champs-Élysées and Ensemble orchestral de Paris play most of their concerts here too, along with other dance, chamber music, recital and pop events.

Although the theatre is privately owned, it is supported by the Caisse des Dépôts et Consignations, which has owned the building since 1970. The theater houses a restaurant on its roof, called Maison Blanche.

Yasmina Reza's 'Art' premiered on the Comédie stage in 1994, winning two Molière awards.

Prices can be expensive for the main stage, and vary widely even for a particular event, from €15 for restricted visibility to €180 for the best seats (April 2022).

The theater, both outside and inside, was featured in the 1973 French espionage movie Escape to Nowhere. It appeared in Jan Kounen's 2009 film Coco Chanel & Igor Stravinsky, starring Mads Mikkelsen and Anna Mougalis in the title roles. The film begins with a brief exterior shot followed by an extensive recreation of the original staging of the "Rite of Spring" and the audience reaction. The theater was the main venue for the 2006 romantic comedy Fauteuils d'orchestre (Orchestra Seats), starring Cécile de France and directed by Danièle Thompson.

== Bibliography ==
- Collins, Peter (2004). Concrete: The Vision of a New Architecture, 2nd edition. Montreal: McGill-Queen's University Press. ISBN 9780773525641.
- Hanser, David A. (2006). Architecture of France. Westport, Connecticut: Greenwood Press. ISBN 978-0-313-31902-0.
- Knapp, Bettina L. (1985). French Theatre 1918–1939. London: Macmillan. ISBN 0-333-37258-1. Copy at Internet Archive.
- Paul, Harry W. (2011). Henri de Rothschild, 1872–1947: Medicine and Theater. Ashgate. ISBN 978-1-4094-0515-3.
- Simeone, Nigel (2000). Paris: A Musical Gazetteer. Yale University Press. ISBN 978-0-300-08053-7.
- Texier, Simon ([2012]). Paris: Panorama de l'architecture de l'antiquité à nos jours. Paris: Parigramme. ISBN 978-2-84096-667-8.
- White, Eric Walter (1966). Stravinsky: The Composer and His Works. Berkeley: University of California Press. OCLC 283025. ISBN 978-0-486-29755-2 (Dover reprint).
