= Jessie Carson =

American librarian (1876–1959

Jessie "Kit" M. Carson
- Born: March 29, 1876; Bellevue, Pennsylvania, U.S.
- Died: September 6, 1959 (age 83); Rye, New York, U.S.
- Education: Carnegie Public Library
- Occupations: Librarian, Hospital Worker

Jessie M. Carson (March 29, 1876 – September 6, 1959) was an American librarian who was appointed the director of children's libraries for the American Committee for Devastated France in 1920. Along with several other children's librarians on leave of absence from the New York Public Library, Carson rehabilitated four libraries devastated by the war and began training young French women in American librarianship practices. She is credited with making lasting change in French libraries, particularly by extending services to children, who had not traditionally been served by French libraries.

== Personal life ==
Carson was born in Bellevue, Pennsylvania on March 19, 1876, to father Thomas, a steelworker, and mother Sadie. She died in Rye, New York on September 6, 1959 at the age of 83.

In addition to being a notable librarian and volunteering in hospitals, Carson was also one of the first women to summitt Mt. Rainier shortly after her move to Washington.

== Early career ==
Carson underwent professional training at the Carnegie Public Library in Pittsburgh, PA, where she later became a children's librarian at the Hazelwood Branch. She later moved to Tacoma, WA, where she also found employment as a children's librarian. She eventually became the head of the children's library there, her department being called the "most advanced in the library".

Her career advanced as she was offered the position of assistant director at the New York Public Library under Anne Caroll Moore, a pioneer in librarianship in her own right. It was there that Carson also met Anne Morgan, daughter of J. P. Morgan, who recommended her for the CARD program.

== Notable works ==
Jessie Carson's report to the American Committee for Devastated France covering the year April 1921 to April 1922 was published in the ALA Bulletin v.16 in 1922.

A novel based on Carson's life, titled Miss Morgan's Book Brigade, was written by Janet Skeslien Charles and was released in 2024 by Simon & Schuster.

== Quotes ==
About her relationship with Miss. Anne Morgan, "I have heard her give the most thrilling talk on France before the National Civic Association and it makes my blood hum to realize what a task I am undertaking to do".

A speech Carson gave about her experiences working as a librarian in America and France can be read here: https://babel.hathitrust.org/cgi/pt?id=uiug.30112071019050&view=2up&seq=32.
