= Anna Maria Gove =

American physician

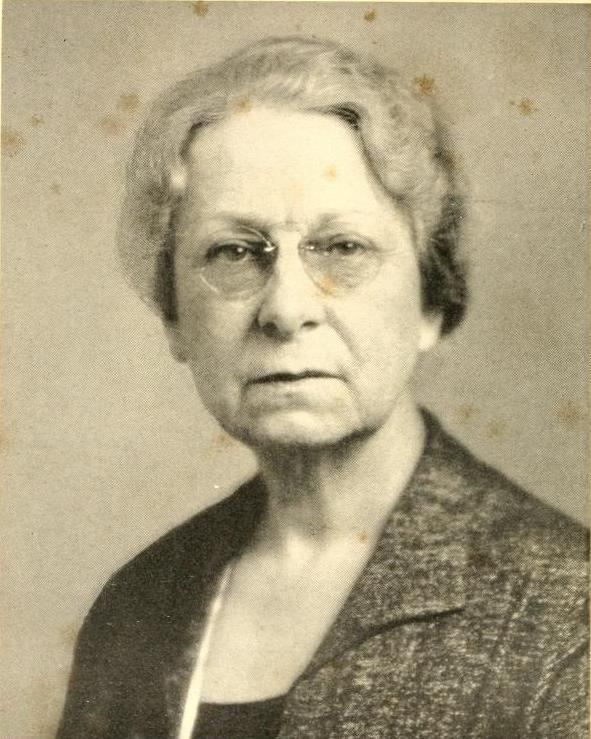
- Gove pictured in The Carolinian (UNCG yearbook), 1932

Campus physician of The University of North Carolina at Greensboro
- In office 1893–1937

Personal details
- Born: July 6, 1867 Whitefield, New Hampshire
- Died: January 28, 1948 (aged 80) Greensboro, North Carolina

Anna Maria Gove (July 6, 1867 – January 28, 1948) was an American physician.

Gove was born on July 6, 1867, in Whitefield, New Hampshire, to George Sullivan and Maria Clark Gove. After her education at MIT and Woman's Medical College of New York Infirmary, from which she graduated in 1892, Gove served for a year in the New York Infant Asylum. In 1893 she came to the State Normal and Industrial School (now UNCG). Gove was only the third woman to receive a medical license in the state of North Carolina. She remained at the school as resident physician, professor of hygiene, and director of the Department of Health until her retirement in 1937.

The original campus infirmary that was built in 1911 was named in Gove's honor. The infirmary built in 1953 to replace the original infirmary was also named the Gove Infirmary. In September 1970, the building was officially named the Anna M. Gove Student Health Center, the name it retains today.

Fond of travel, Gove visited many parts of the world. In 1896-1897 and again in 1913–1914, she visited Vienna for postgraduate study. During World War I, she served with the Red Cross in the Children's Relief Division in Marseilles and Ardèche and with the Smith College Relief Unit. In 1926-1927 she took a leave of absence from the college and traveled extensively in the Orient. She also spent many summers in study and clinical work in the United States at Cornell, Chicago, New York City and Michigan. Gove died in Greensboro on January 28, 1948.
