= Hombleux =

- Commune
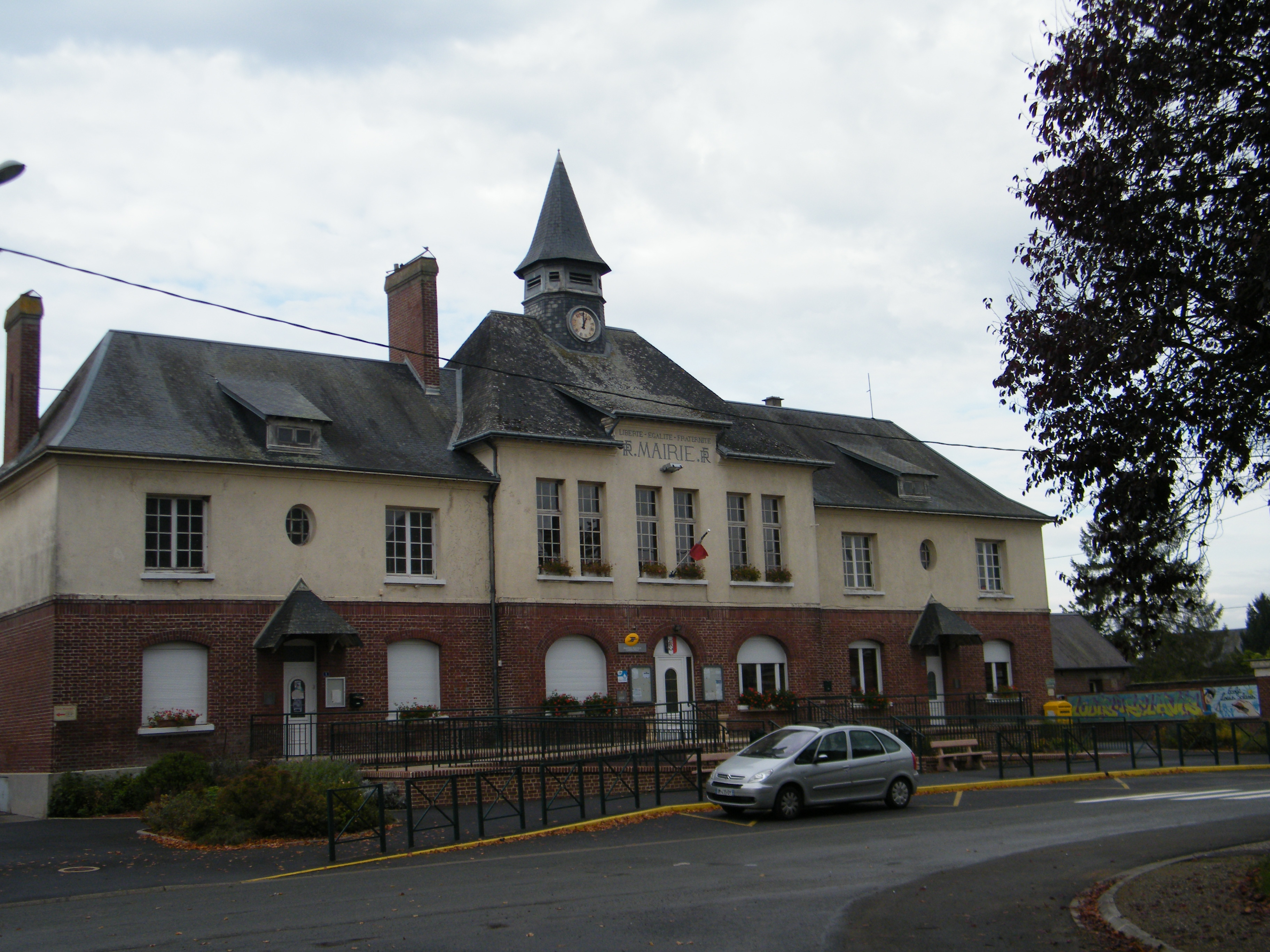
- The town hall in Hombleux
- Location of Hombleux
- Location within France Location within Hauts-de-France
- Coordinates: 49°44′21″N 2°59′10″E
- Country: France
- Region: Hauts-de-France
- Department: Somme
- Arrondissement: Péronne
- Canton: Ham
- Intercommunality: CC Est de la Somme
- Area^{1}: 15.81 km^{2} (6.10 sq mi)
- Elevation: 67 m (220 ft)
- Highest elevation: 76 m (249 ft)
- Lowest elevation: 52 m (171 ft)
- Population (2023): 1,111
  - Density: 70.27/km^{2} (182.0/sq mi)
- Time zone: UTC+01:00 (CET)
  - Summer (DST): UTC+02:00 (CEST)
- INSEE/Postal code: 80442 /80400
- ^{1} French Land Register data, which excludes lakes, ponds, glaciers > 1 km^{2} (0.386 sq mi or 247 acres) and river estuaries.

Hombleux (French pronunciation: [ɔ̃blø]) is a commune in the Somme department in Hauts-de-France in northern France. On 1 January 2019, the former commune Grécourt was merged into Hombleux.

== Geography ==
Hombleux is situated at the D154 and D144 road junction, some 16 miles (26 km) southwest of Saint-Quentin.

== Population ==
Population data refer to the area corresponding with the commune as of January 2025.

Historical population
Year	Pop.	±% p.a.
1968	965	—
1975	1,070	+1.49%
1982	1,165	+1.22%
1990	1,134	−0.34%
1999	1,035	−1.01%
2007	1,017	−0.22%
2012	1,121	+1.97%
2017	1,180	+1.03%
2023	1,111	−1.00%
Source: INSEE

== See also ==
- Communes of the Somme department
