= Ruth Webster Lathrop =

American physician

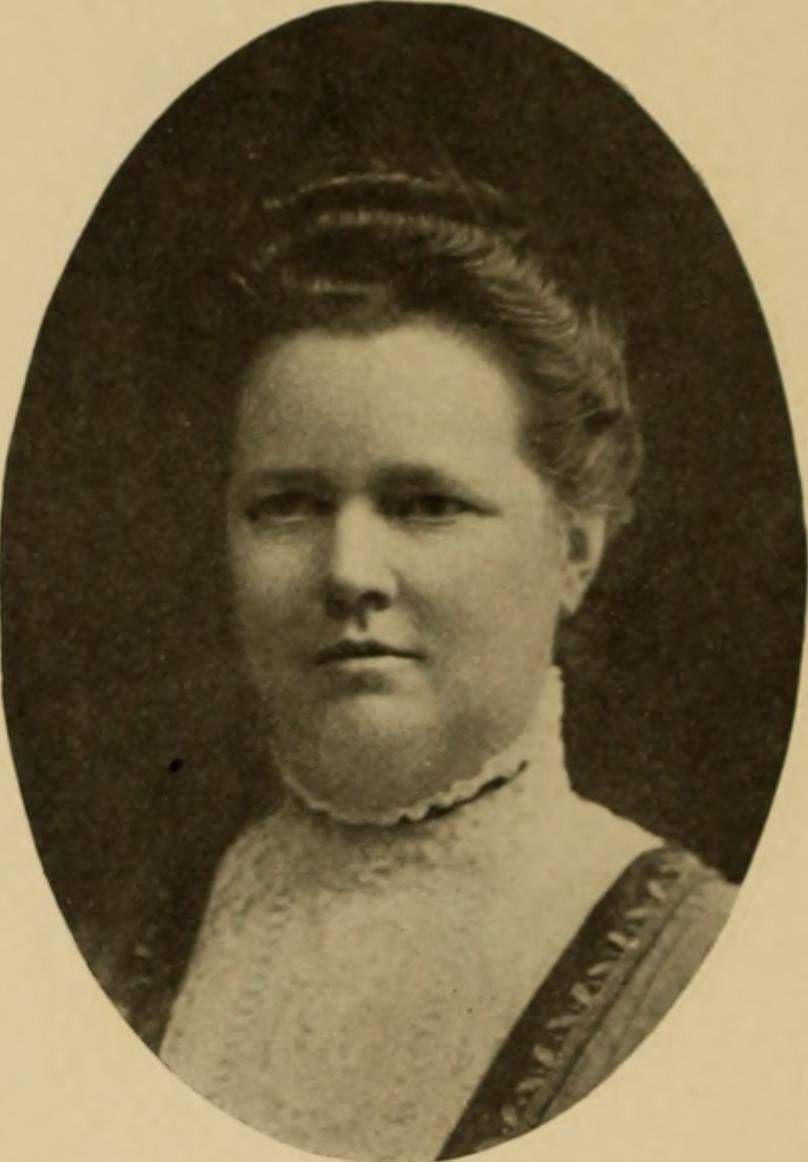
- Ruth Webster Lathrop, from a 1911 yearbook.
- Born: May 23, 1862; New York
- Died: July 31, 1940 (aged 78); Philadelphia
- Occupations: Physician, medical school professor

Ruth Webster Lathrop (May 23, 1862 – July 31, 1940) was an American physician and medical school professor, who taught physiology at the Woman's Medical College of Pennsylvania.

== Early life ==
Lathrop was from Le Roy, New York, the daughter of Francis Cuming Lathrop and Fannie Aurelia Comstock Lathrop. She attended Ingham University in her hometown, and graduated from Wellesley College in 1883. She earned a medical degree at the Woman's Medical College of Pennsylvania in 1891.

== Career ==
Lathrop taught physiology and anatomy courses at the Woman's Medical College of Philadelphia. She was one of several faculty who resigned in protest in 1923, when colleague Alice Weld Tallant's appointment was not renewed. She later taught at Temple University School of Medicine. She retired in 1937.

Lathrop was one of the vice-presidents of the American Academy of Medicine, an affiliated society of the American Medical Association, focused on "sociological problems in the field of medicine". She and her mother were charter members of the Independence Hall chapter of the Daughters of the American Revolution. She was also active in the Philadelphia Wellesley Club, and the Association of Collegiate Alumnae.

== Personal life ==
Lathrop lived in Philadelphia with a fellow physician, Annie Bartram Hall. She died at their home in 1940, aged 78 years, from heat exhaustion. At her request, her remains were dressed in academic regalia for cremation.
