= Harriet Bliss Ford =

American editor

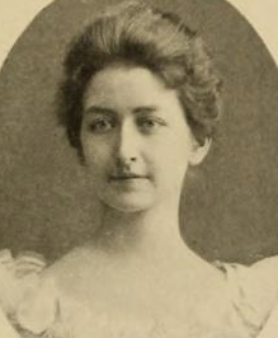
- Harriet Chalmers Bliss, later Ford, from the 1899 yearbook of Smith College
- Born: Harriet Chalmers Bliss; November 28, 1876; New York, New York, U.S.
- Died: February 20, 1964 (aged 87); Northampton, Massachusetts, U.S.
- Occupations: Editor, writer, clubwoman

Harriet Chalmers Bliss Ford (November 28, 1876 – February 20, 1964) was an American editor, writer, and clubwoman. From 1899 to 1912, she was an editor at The Century Magazine. Later, she held national leadership roles in the YWCA, and worked in Paris during World War I. She was elected vice-president of Smith College in 1931.

== Early life and education ==
Bliss was born in New York City and raised in Pittsfield, Massachusetts, the daughter of Charles Bliss and Harriet Maria Kopper Bliss. Her father was a physician and Union Army veteran of the American Civil War, and her mother was born in Scotland. Both of her parents died in the 1880s. She graduated from Smith College in 1899.

== Career ==
From 1899 to 1912, Bliss was an editorial assistant and then editor at The Century Magazine. Later, she held national leadership roles in the YWCA. She was based in Paris during World War I, at the Paris headquarters of the American Red Cross, and as chair of the city's committee of the Smith College Relief Unit in France. She was decorated by the King of Montenegro and received the Médaille Argent from the French government for her wartime work.

Ford was a trustee of Smith College from 1928 to 1936, and was elected vice-president of Smith College in 1931. She also lived on campus for several years as resident trustee, beginning in 1931. In 1937, she was named executive chair of the National Committee on the Cause and Cure of War. During World War II, she was a local representative of the Office of Price Administration in Northampton, Massachusetts.

== Publications ==
- "A Garden of Yesterdays" (1897, poem)
- "The Great Man and his Christmas Tree" (1897, story)
- "To Saint Valentine" (1898, poem, with Ethel Wallace Hawkins)
- "Come, Sleep-Flowers" (1898, poem)
- "The Cricket" (1904, poem)

== Personal life ==
Bliss married George Burdett Ford in 1912. Her husband, an architect and city planner, died after a surgery in 1930, and she died in 1964, at the age of 87, at a nursing home in Northampton. There is a collection of her papers in the Smith College Archives.
