= Anne Murray Dike =

American doctor and chair of the American Committee for Devastated France

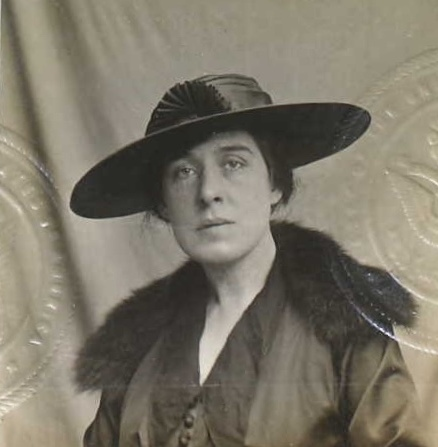
Anne Murray Dike, 1916

Anne Murray Dike (1878-1929) was an American doctor, chair of the American Committee for Devastated France from 1917 and recipient of the Croix de Guerre and member of the Legion of Honour.

== Early life ==
She was born Anne Veitch Murray in Edinburgh Scotland about June 8, 1878. She immigrated to the United States about 1908 in which year she married Francis Harold Dike, a Columbia graduate and instructor in French and English at MIT (1900–10) whom she divorced in 1914.

== World War I ==
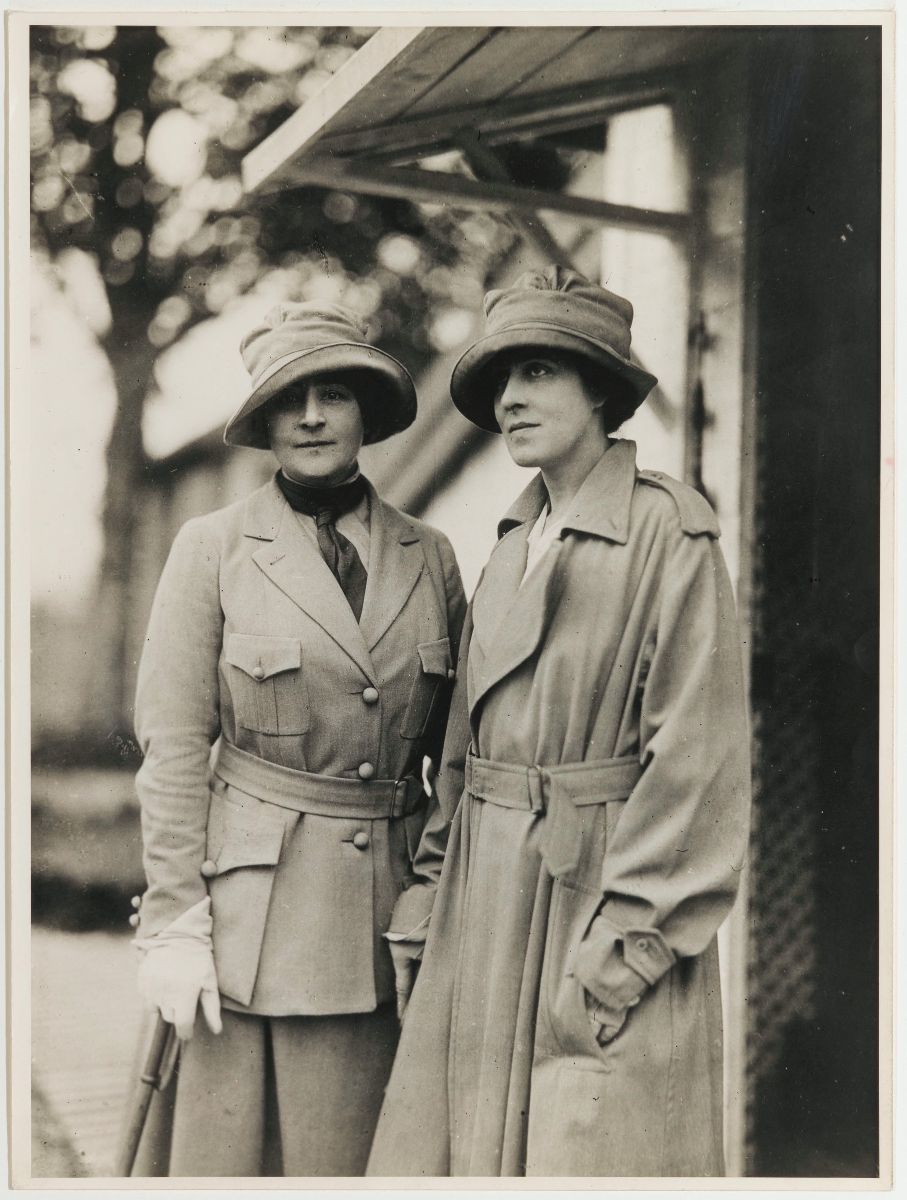
Anne Morgan and Anne Murray Dike, ca. 1915

Anne Murray Dike joined philanthropist Anne Morgan in France. From 1917 to 1921 Morgan took residence near the French front, not far from both Soissons and the "Chemin des Dames" at Blérancourt, and ran The American Friends of France. It employed several hundred people, including domestic and foreign volunteers and financed in part from donations from the States. Of seeing the French countryside during the war, Dike said in 1919, "You can travel in a motor going forward in a straight line for fifteen hours and see nothing but ruins". In 2010 the Morgan Library & Museum held an exhibition which focused on their relief work entitled Anne Morgan's War: Rebuilding Devastated France, 1917–1924.

In 1924, Morgan and Dike both were made officers of the French Legion of Honor during a ceremony held at Blérancourt.

== Death ==
Dike died on February 8, 1929, at the home she shared with Morgan at 43 Rue de Courcelles in Paris, due to complications of neoplastic myeloma. She is buried in the village cemetery at Blérancourt.

The estate of Blérancourt was transformed into a museum and inaugurated in 1930, one year after her death.
