= Anne Morgan (philanthropist) =

American philanthropist (1873–1952)

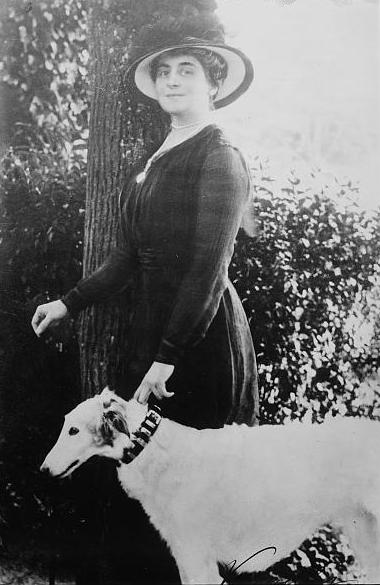
- Born: Anne Tracy Morgan; July 25, 1873; Highland Falls, New York, US
- Died: January 29, 1952 (aged 78); Mount Kisco, New York, US
- Occupation: Philanthropist
- Parent(s): John Pierpont Morgan; Frances Louisa Tracy
- Relatives: Morgan family

Signature
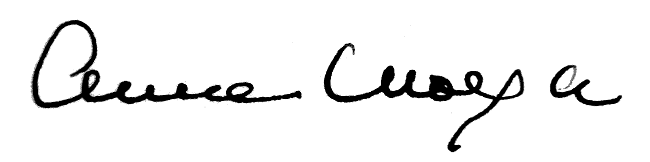

Anne Tracy Morgan (July 25, 1873 – January 29, 1952) was an American philanthropist who provided relief efforts in aid to France during and after World War I and II. Morgan was educated privately, traveled frequently and grew up amongst the wealth her father, banker J. P. Morgan, had amassed. She was awarded a medal from the National Institute of Social Science in 1915, the same year she published the story The American Girl. In 1932 she became the first American woman appointed a commander of the French Legion of Honor.

== Early years ==
Anne Tracy Morgan was born on July 25, 1873, at "Cragston" her family's country estate on the Hudson River at Highland Falls, New York, the youngest of four children born to John Pierpont Morgan and his wife, Frances Louisa (née Tracy) Morgan.

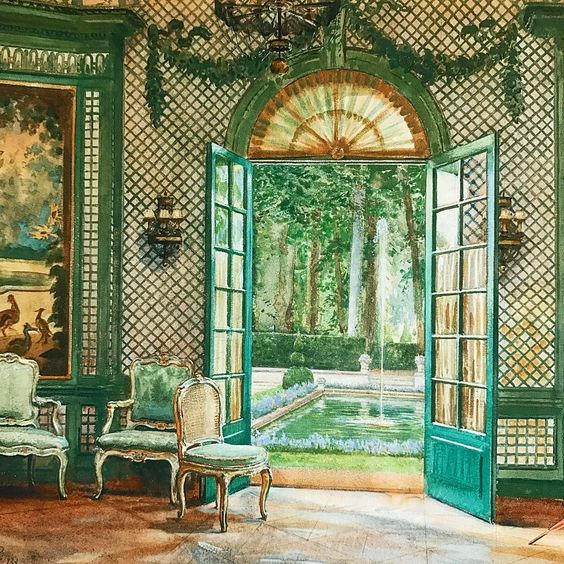
Interior of Elsie De Wolfe' music pavilion looking out on to the pool, The Villa Trianon, William Bruce Ellis Ranken

== Career ==
In 1903, she became part owner of the Villa Trianon near Versailles, France, along with decorator and socialite Elsie De Wolfe and theatrical/literary agent Elisabeth Marbury. Morgan was instrumental in assisting De Wolfe, her close friend, in pioneering a career in interior decoration. The three women, known as "The Versailles Triumvirate" hosted a salon in France and, in 1903, along with Florence Jaffray Harriman, helped organize the Colony Club, the first women's social club in New York City and, later, helped found the exclusive neighborhood of Sutton Place along Manhattan's East River.

Around 1910, she became a union activist. Anne Morgan actively supported striking female workers in New York's garment industry. She and other wealthy female members of her social circle stood in picket lines with striking shirtwaist workers and contributed financially to their cause. These strikes in New York's garment industry immediately preceded the Triangle Shirtwaist Fire.

By 1921, Morgan's interest in women's employment and experience founding the Colony Club evolved into the American Woman's Association, where a working woman "with ambition, pluck and energy, which will push her up and up in her profession" could network and develop leadership skills. Morgan was quoted saying that although no women of the time were equipped to head a large corporation, "in time there will be plenty of such women -- it requires only evolution." By 1930 the American Woman's Association had constructed a large building of its own in New York City, most recently the Hudson Hotel. Along with a roof garden, numerous parlors, meeting rooms, and residential space, this building featured "a sunny gynmnasium equipped with every facility for body-building, including one of the finest swimming pools in America."

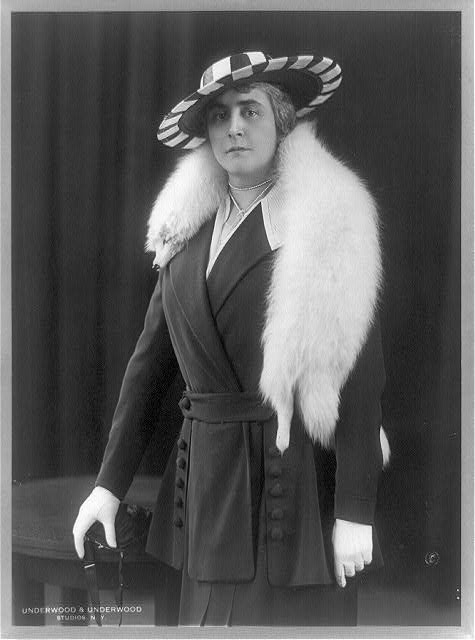
Underwood & Underwood Studios, New York City/LOC cph.3b45075. Anne Morgan, wearing fur stole, ca. 1915

In 1912, she started the Society for the Prevention of Useless Giving (SPUG) with Eleanor Robson Belmont.

In 1916, Morgan and De Wolfe largely funded Cole Porter's first Broadway musical, See America First, produced by Marbury.

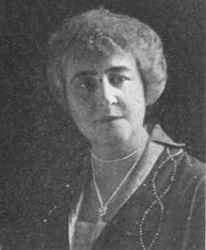
Anne Morgan, 1921

From 1917 to 1921, Morgan took residence near the French front, not far from both Soissons and the "Chemin des Dames" at Blérancourt, and ran a formidable help organisation, The American Friends of France (it employed several hundred people at a time, volunteers from abroad and locally recruited staff), financed partly out of her own deep pockets, partly with the help of an active network in the States. The AFF (aka American Committee for Devastated France) was active in succoring noncombatants, organizing a health service that still exists in Soissons, a workshop to provide basic furniture to bombed-out families, a holiday camp for children, and a mobile library that was taken over by the library in Soissons, and so on. She returned in 1939 to help the Soissons evacuees.

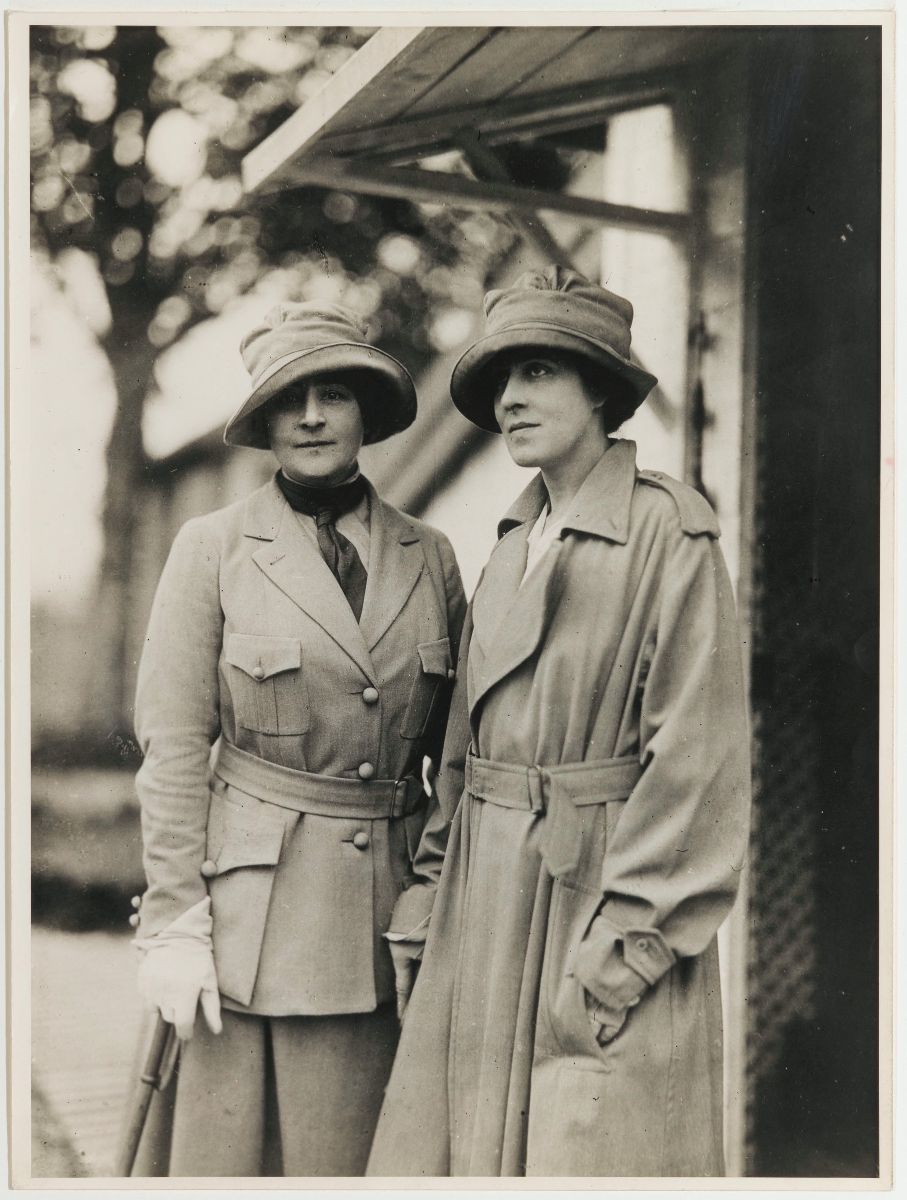
Anne Morgan and Anne Murray Dike, ca. 1915

Anne Murray Dike, a doctor, joined Anne Morgan in France. The two were rewarded for their services, and they later developed a platonic relationship. The estate of Blérancourt was transformed into a museum and inaugurated in 1930, one year after the death of Anne Murray Dike. Dike is buried in the village cemetery at Blérancourt.

Morgan's friendships included many socialites and celebrities of her day. Her connection to individuals such as Cole Porter, as mentioned above, allowed her to compile a cookbook for charity. Titled the Spécialités de la Maison and published in 1940 to benefit the AFF, it offered recipes by cultural icons such as Pearl S. Buck, Salvador Dalí, and Katharine Hepburn.

She died on January 29, 1952, in Mount Kisco, New York.

== Legacy ==
In order to maintain the health service network that Anne Morgan and the rest of the American volunteers had created during the First World War in the French region of Aisne, the American Committee founded the Association d’Hygiène Sociale de l´Aisne (A.H.S.A), an organization that would inherit the assets, personnel and know-how of the American Committee for Devastated France under the direction of Anne Murray Dike. The Association, that changed its name to Association Médico-Sociale Anne Morgan in 1953, after Anne Morgan´s death, has persisted to this day and continues with the work that Anne Morgan began more than 100 years ago. In 2010 the Morgan Library & Museum held an exhibition which focused on this relief work in France during and after World War I titled Anne Morgan's War: Rebuilding Devastated France, 1917–1924.

A four-story townhouse built in the Sutton Place neighborhood of Manhattan's Upper East Side in New York City for Morgan in 1921, was years later donated by Arthur A. Houghton Jr. as a gift to the United Nations in 1971. It has been, since 1972, the official residence of the United Nations Secretary-General.

== Sources ==
- Morgan, Anne Tracy, Noted Relations: Celebrities, et Cetera. Retrieved 2006
- Morgan, Anne Tracy, Encyclopædia Britannica. Dec 22, 2006
