= Isabel Stevens Lathrop =

American singer

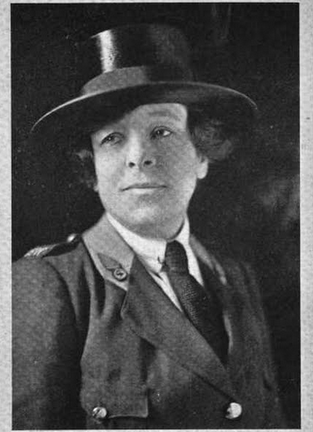
Isabel Stevens Lathrop, from a 1919 publication.

Isabel Stevens Harris Lathrop (1868 – October 26, 1964) was an American singer. She was made a member of the French Legion of Honor for her hospital and reconstruction work in Paris during and after World War I.

== Early life ==
Isabel Stevens Harris was born in California, the daughter of Elias B. Harris and Anna Isabella Stevens Harris. Her father was a Navy surgeon. Her mother was a member of the Stevens family of Hoboken, New Jersey, founders of the Stevens Institute of Technology.

She studied music in New York City, in Belgium, and as a student of Jean de Reszke in Paris.

== Career ==
Lathrop worked in the settlement movement and was interested in music education. Lathrop wrote Musical Dates for Little Pates (1912), which was describes as "funny jingles and rhymes" for teaching the alphabet. She also gave performances as a concert soprano, debuting in 1908 at the Colony Club in New York City.

During World War I, Lathrop was a founder and president of the American Fund for French Wounded in 1914, and chaired the organization's Paris depot, which was housed in a former music hall. Botanist Anna Murray Vail was the treasurer at the Paris depot. Her written request to the American Red Cross for supplies in 1916 was reprinted in the New York Times: "We have never had such demands on us for cotton and bandages &c. The fighting at Verdun has been so fierce and so persistent we have had a veritable house cleaning." Her 1918 cables home were reprinted in the Chicago Tribune and other newspapers. She worked with the Horticultural Society of New York to distribute their "French Fruit Tree Fund", to fund the planting of new trees in the region around Verdun after the war. She also helped to found the American Memorial Hospital at Rheims, dedicated in 1922, and raised funds for the building of another hospital at Toul. Upon returning to the United States, she gave lectures about her experiences in France.

== Personal life ==
Isabel Stevens Harris married Benjamin Girault Lathrop. They had three daughters, Isabel, Sylvia, and Elsie. Isabel Stevens Lathrop died in 1964, aged 96 years, at a nursing home in Huntington, New York.

Letters written by Isabel Stevens Lathrop to a donor during her Paris work are in the American Fund for French Wounded collection, Yale University Library.
