= American Committee for Devastated France =

Humanitarian aid organization

- Formation: 1919
- Purpose: Humanitarian aid
- Headquarters: Blérancourt, France
- Region served: French Third Republic

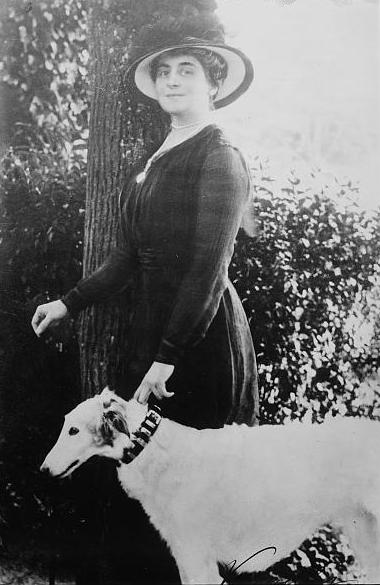
Anne Morgan, co-founder of the American Committee for Devastated France

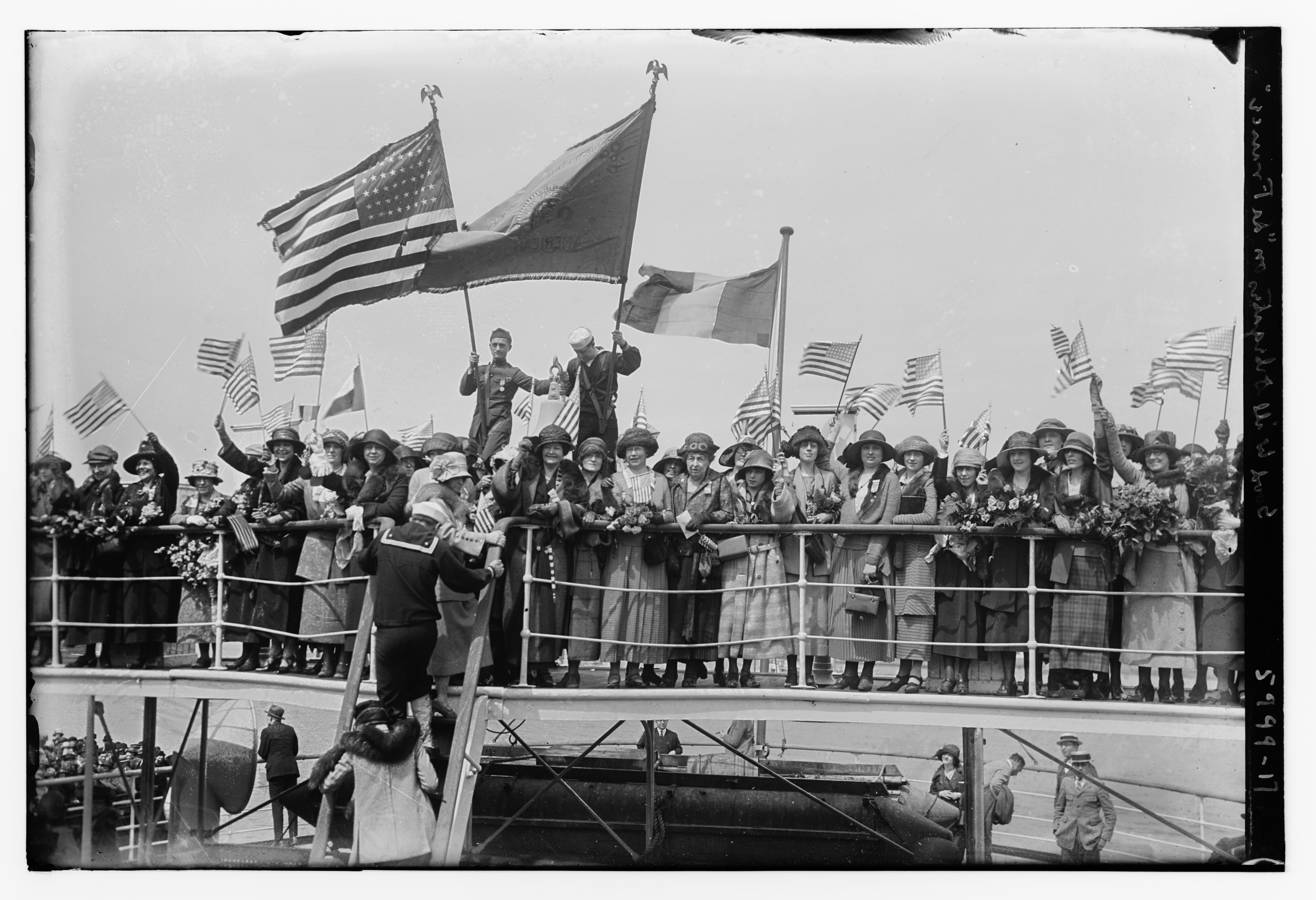
A goodwill delegation of American businesswomen travel to France on behalf of the committee in 1923

American Committee for Devastated France (1919–1924), also known as CARD (Comité Américain pour les Régions Dévastées de France), was a group of American women who volunteered to help the French Third Republic recover from the destruction of The Great War (later known as World War I)

== Creation of CARD ==
The volunteer civilian relief organization was founded by philanthropist Anne Morgan and her friend Anne Murray Dike, as a continuation the volunteer work of the American Fund for French Wounded (1915-1919), of which they had both been members. Morgan's commanding personality and social status helped her rally potential volunteers and raise funds while traveling across the United States. Dike, a physician, organized field work in France. Headquarters were set up in the 17th-century Château de Blérancourt, less than 40 miles (64 km) from the war's front.

Morgan, the youngest daughter of financier J.P. Morgan and his second wife, Frances Louisa Tracy, used photographs to document the suffering in France. Images of ruined communities and French refugees highlighted the human cost of war. Committee applicants had to speak French, hold a driver's license, and most had to pay their own expenses — $1,500 for a typical six-month tour of volunteer duty. Blue martial uniforms were required. They could be custom-made for $45, by B. Altman Company. Anne Morgan told potential volunteers they would face hard work and devastation; the women lived in barracks and worked long hours. “We do not want sightseers who would like to go over for half a year to view France's battlefields,” The New York Times reported.

== The paper of CARD in the Great War ==
Some 350 volunteers from the American Committee for Devastated France served in France. Among them was Mary Carson Breckinridge (1881-1965). Many female physicians in the United States — an estimated 6,000 during The Great War era — wanted to serve in Europe. The military medical corps would not accept women as officers, so the committee provided an opportunity to serve. Breckinridge gained key experience in post-war Europe that helped inspire her to create the non-profit Kentucky Committee for Mothers and Babies, later known as the Frontier Nursing Service. Anna Lander West McDonnell (1876-1966), the youngest child of Charles and Marguerite Rode Lander West of San Francisco, California, was already living in France at the time of the war, having moved to Paris with her husband in 1907. Widowed in 1910, owning land in France and with no children, McDonnell served as a hospital auxiliary or nurse in Bordeaux until around the start of the Great War. She returned to the United States, but went back to France in 1918 to serve the committee.

Another volunteer was future diplomat Lucile Atcherson Curtis, who was eventually transferred to Paris to become director of personnel there for the American Committee for Devastated France, and in December 1919 was given the Medaille de la Reconnaissance Francaise for her work. Established landscape architect Mary Rutherfurd Jay would also join the ranks of Morgan's Committee, commanding an agricultural unit of women who trained wounded soldiers to raise crops by seed. Jessie Carson was an American librarian who was appointed the director of children's libraries for the American Committee for Devastated France in 1918. She is credited with making lasting change in French libraries, particularly by extending services to children, who had not traditionally been served by French libraries. Lily Morehead Mebane was an American public servant and heiress who joined the committee in 1918, and was later awarded the Cross of Mercy by Peter I of Serbia and the Legion of Honour by the French government for her work with the organization.

== Dissolution of CARD and foundation of the AHSA ==
In 1924, Anne Morgan finally deems the principal mission of the CARD as finished, and decides to dissolve the committee. However, she doesn't want the humanitarian aid network that has been created during the war and post-war years to disappear. Thus, in order for the nurses and doctors to be able to continue with their work in the region, the American Committee founds the Association d´Hygiène Sociale de l´Aisne (AHSA), which would be presided by Anne Murray Dike.

Even though on paper AHSA was a different association than the original Committee, in practice it worked as if it was the same organization, inheriting from the CARD both the personnel and the know-how which had characterized the American Committee. In fact, despite being a French association, the AHSA would maintain close ties with Anne Morgan and other American partners.

== The AHSA nowadays (Association Médico-Sociale Anne Morgan) ==
In 1953, after Anne Morgan's death, the Association would decide to change its name to Association Médico-Sociale Anne Morgan, in order to honour their defunct founder. Still active, AMSAM is one of the largest associations in the Aisne department. Over time, AMSAM has expanded its services and focused on home care and assistance activities, while fighting against all forms of exclusion. Its head office is located in Soissons.

== See also ==
- Comité des Étudiants Américains de l'École des Beaux-Arts Paris
