= Grécourt =

- Part of Hombleux
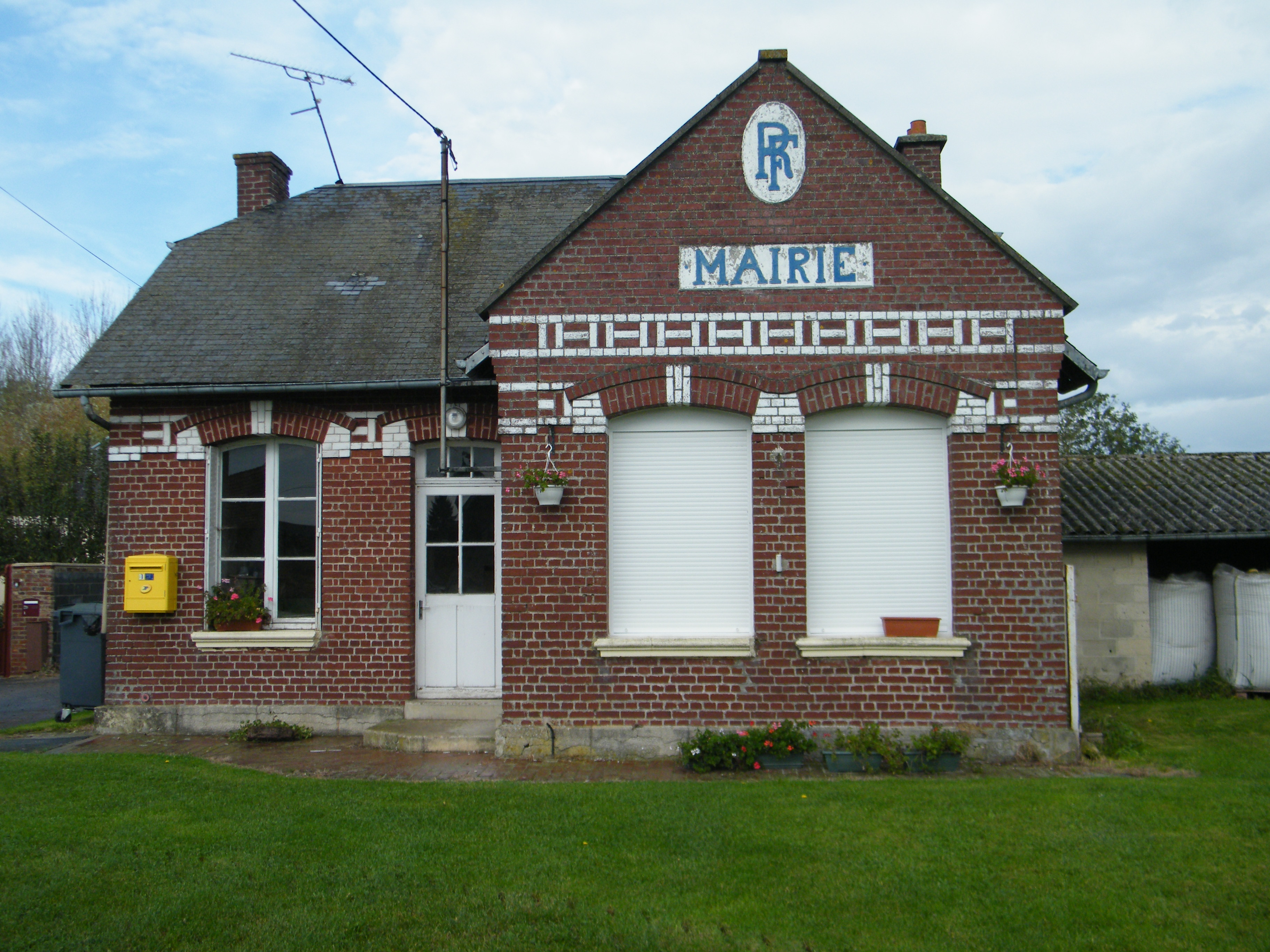
- The town hall in Grécourt
- Location of Grécourt
- Location within France Location within Hauts-de-France
- Coordinates: 49°43′33″N 2°59′14″E
- Country: France
- Region: Hauts-de-France
- Department: Somme
- Arrondissement: Péronne
- Canton: Ham
- Commune: Hombleux
- Area^{1}: 2.34 km^{2} (0.90 sq mi)
- Elevation: 65 m (213 ft)
- Highest elevation: 71 m (233 ft)
- Lowest elevation: 61 m (200 ft)
- Population (2016): 21
  - Density: 9.0/km^{2} (23/sq mi)
- Time zone: UTC+01:00 (CET)
  - Summer (DST): UTC+02:00 (CEST)
- Postal code: 80400
- ^{1} French Land Register data, which excludes lakes, ponds, glaciers > 1 km^{2} (0.386 sq mi or 247 acres) and river estuaries.

Grécourt (French pronunciation: [ɡʁekuʁ]) is a former commune in the Somme department in Hauts-de-France in northern France. On 1 January 2019, it was merged into the commune Hombleux.

== Geography ==
The commune is situated on the D114 road, some 8 miles (13 km) east of Roye.

== Population ==
Historical population
Year	Pop.	±% p.a.
1962	32	—
1968	30	−1.07%
1975	19	−6.32%
1982	25	+4.00%
1990	24	−0.51%
1999	26	+0.89%
2016	21	−1.25%
Source: EHESS and INSEE

== See also ==
- Communes of the Somme department
