= Milwaukee College =

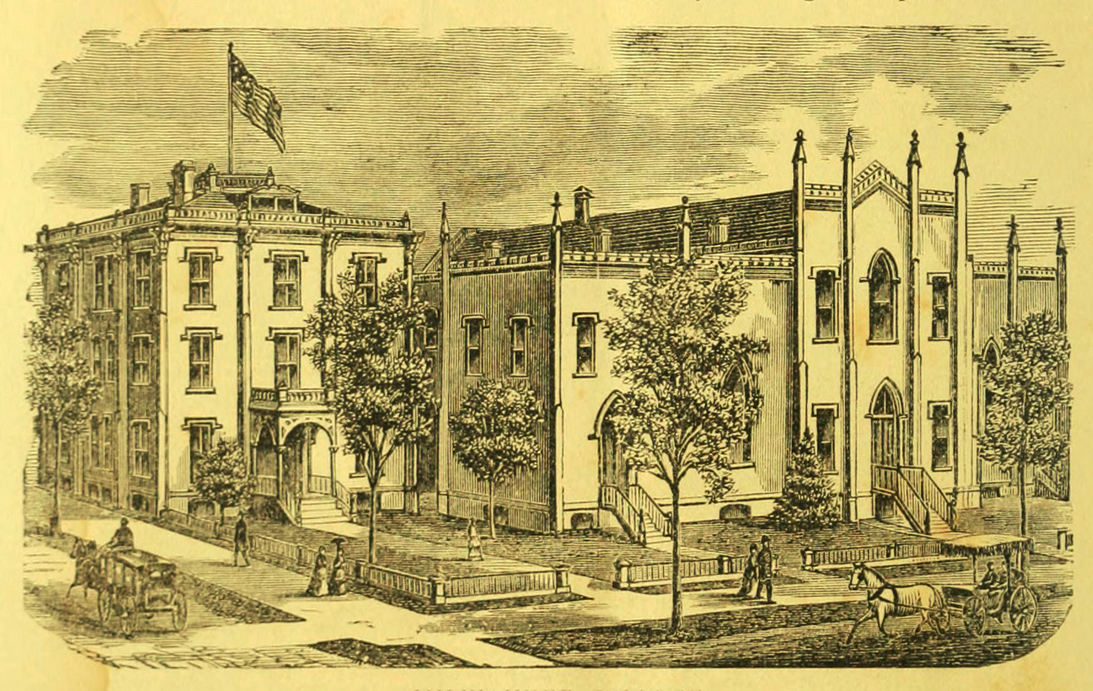
Milwaukee College (1877)

Milwaukee College began as the Milwaukee Female Seminary founded by Lucy A. (nee, Seymour) Parsons, of Le Roy Female Institute. She was the wife of Rev. W. L. Parsons, pastor of Milwaukee's Free Congregational church. The school opened on September 14, 1848, in a house in downtown Milwaukee. Two years later, Catharine Beecher and her associate Mary Mortimer, who had worked with Lucy at Le Roy Female Institute, became connected with the Seminary. Beecher, a reformer and eldest sister of Harriet Beecher Stowe, had designed "The Beecher Plan" for educating women through the college level for professions. She was invited to launch her plan in Milwaukee and came there first in April, 1850. "The Beecher Plan" focused on four professions most open to women: teaching, child care, nursing, and "conservation of the domestic state". The school was incorporated in March 1851, as the Milwaukee Normal Institute and High School, and moved to new quarters. In 1852, through the influence of Beecher, US$17,894 was received from her friends in the East and the American Woman's Educational Association; Milwaukeeans raised another $13,540; and a permanent home for the school was commissioned on the corner of Juneau Avenue and Milwaukee Street (near the site later to be occupied by the Milwaukee School of Engineering). The school opened there in the fall of 1852, though the building was not yet finished. By act of the legislature the name was changed in April 1853, to Milwaukee Female College. In March 1876, the name was changed to Milwaukee College. In July 1895, Milwaukee College and Downer College merged to become Milwaukee-Downer College.

== Early years (1850s) ==
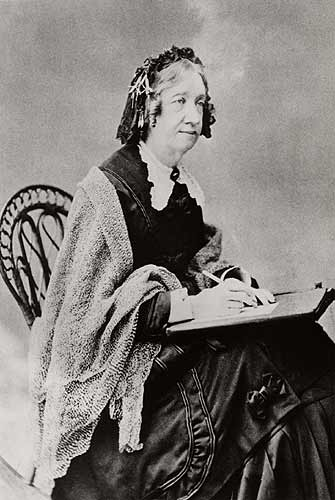
Catherine Beecher

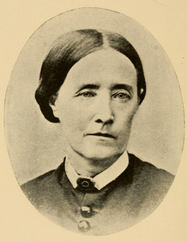
Mary Mortimer (1894)

After the first influx of settlers in Milwaukee, the demand for suitable education for the children became urgent. To meet this need, supplied previously only by small private schools, the "Milwaukee Female Seminary" was opened on the September 14, 1848, by Mrs. L. A. Parsons, whose husband, Rev. W. L. Parsons, was, at that time, pastor of the Free Congregational Church in Milwaukee. Mrs. Parsons, with the Associate Principal, Miss L. L. Chamberlain, and other teachers, laid a foundation for education. Their aim was to establish a permanent institution for the thorough education of young ladies.

In the second year, the school opened in more commodious quarters on the corner of Milwaukee and Oneida streets, with an enlarged corps of instructors and a Board of Trustees. At this time, Catharine E. Beecher, having a deep interest in the proper education of women, obtained contributions in the Eastern States for the establishment of schools for girls, with the plan of a faculty of co-equal teachers, sustained by endowments, each being the head of a given department. In the pursuance of this plan, Beecher provided the Milwaukee school with US$1,000 for library and apparatus, on conditions which gave an impetus to the efforts of the citizens in behalf of the school.

In March 1851, a charter was granted to the institution, under the name of the Milwaukee Normal Institute and High School, and in the succeeding summer, the first graduating class of two members received their diplomas. In May 1852, the Woman's Educational Association of New York adopted Beecher's plan as their own, and the combined exertions of the women of this Association and of the people of Milwaukee resulted in the purchase of new grounds on the corner of Milwaukee and Division streets, and in the erection of the main building of the college. Money collected at the East and expended for library and apparatus, for part purchase of land, teachers' salaries, and various expenses connected with the college totaled US$17,894. Money contributed by citizens of Milwaukee for part purchase of land, erection of building and other expenses totaled US$13,540.

In June 1852, the corner stone of the new building was laid. In the Autumn of 1852, the school was opened in the yet unfinished building. Beecher's plan of various departments, each with an independent head, assumed more definite form. The Board of Instruction was made up as follows: Mary Mortimer, Department of Superintending Instruction and Teacher of Normal School; Mrs. L. A. Parsons, Department of Classification and Arrangement and Teacher of Geography, History, Mental and Moral Sciences; Miss A. Loomis, Department of Government and Teacher of Mathematics and Natural Science; Miss J. Millard, Department of Finance and Correspondence and Teacher of Language, Literature, etc.; Miss E. B. Warner, Department of Primary Instruction; together with Instructors in Languages, Music and Drawing, and assistants in the various departments. Mortimer, previously connected with the school as a teacher, became from this time closely identified with its interests for many years.

In April 1853, the name of the Institution was changed by act of Legislature to Milwaukee Female College; a further change at a later date leaving the name simply Milwaukee College.

For several years the school made continued progress, the annual number of pupils averaging 250. The financial crisis of 1857 had an effect upon the college, and combined with the opening of the High School, to weaken its support. Mortimer, unable to carry out her plans in Milwaukee, and invited by an opening elsewhere, withdrew from the college, leaving it under the management of Miss Mary E. Chapin and Miss Caroline E. Chapin. During their administration, the College Home was erected, north of the main building, which later became occupied as a home for the teachers and pupils from a distance.

== Second decade (1860s) ==
In 1863, the continued pressure of adverse times occasioned the withdrawal of the ladies in charge, and Prof. S. S. Sherman assumed the control of the college. The three years of his connection with the college were prosperous. Through the efforts of the Trustees, repairs and improvements were made in the buildings, the library increased, and philosophical, chemical and astronomical apparatus added. Beecher, however, took the ground that the change in the management of the college, was a departure from the original plan and intention of its founders, and a violation of agreement, and in 1866, on behalf of the Educational Association, she entered a protest against the continuance of this management, which occasioned the immediate and voluntary resignation of Prof. Sherman. In the Autumn of 1866, the school opened with Mortimer once more at the head, and with the various departments divided and officered as originally intended. In the following year, an addition was made in the rear of the main building, for use as a gymnasium, the expense defrayed by subscriptions amounting to US$3,000. For eight years, the college remained under Mortimer's supervision, with continued usefulness, and with a large number of graduates, until, in 1874, Mortimer resigned her position.

The Trustees, after long and careful consideration, entered into arrangements which resulted in the installment of Prof. Charles Samuel Farrar, formerly of Vassar College, as president of the institution. He raised and expended US$22,000 on improvements. Mrs. Farrar served as Lady Principal. There were a corps of 16 instructors at this time.

== Third decade (1870s) ==
In 1874, an association of ladies was formed under the name of the Ladies' Art and Science Class, for purposes of study and discussion, with the co-operation and assistance of President Farrar. This organization grew from year to year in numbers and interest. The first year was devoted to the History of Theoretic Chemistry, the second to the History of the Applications of Chemistry to the Arts, the third and fourth to the History of Sculpture, the fifth and sixth to the History of Painting, and the seventh is occupied with the History of Architecture. This class, assembling each week during the Winter, proved a stimulus to research and a strong influence in the guidance of interest in art. A valuable art library was collected by the class, to which additions were made.

In 1875, Hon. Hiram Barber, of Horicon, Wisconsin presented to the college an astronomical telescope, and in the following year William P. McLaren, of Milwaukee, furnished the money for the erection of an astronomical observatory, fully equipped with instruments.

From 1874 till 1877, the regular attendance had grown from 100 to nearly 300. After the death of Mortimer in that year, a fund was established in the honor of her memory, by the Alumnæ, and her personal friends, for the purchase of the Mary Mortimer Memorial Library, the nucleus being a collection of books bequeathed by herself.

In 1879, an additional building was erected on the college grounds, containing a large hall for elocutionary and gymnastic exercises, two studios for the art department and other rooms. The college has also received various gifts in addition to the cabinet and library.

The Alethean Society was a voluntary organization of the students of the collegiate classes for literary improvement.

== Fourth decade (1880s) ==
The attendance during the school year of 1880-81 was as follows: Regular students, 220; students in Art, Languages and Music, 140; ladies of the Art and Science class, 82.

== Merger (1890s) ==
In July 1895, Milwaukee College and Downer College merged to become Milwaukee-Downer College.

== Notable people ==
- Catharine Beecher
- Mary Mortimer
- Klas August Linderfelt (1847 – March 18, 1900), librarian; taught at Milwaukee College
- Increase A. Lapham, LL.D. served as the first President of the Board of Trustees in 1849, and terminated only with his death in 1875. For 26 years, he took a prominent part in the counsels, for more than half that time the President, and thereafter, a member of the Board of Trustees.
- O. H. Waldo served as President of the Board for several years, and was closely identified with the college from its early days until his death in 1874.
- Mr. J. H. Van Dyke, Hon. A. C. May and M. P. Jewett, LL.D., also filled the position of President of the Board of Trustees.

=== Alumni ===
- Minerva Brace Norton (1837–1894), educator and author
- Emma May Alexander Reinertsen (1853–1920), writer, social reformer

== See also ==
- Women's colleges in the United States
