= Minerva Brace Norton =

American educator and author

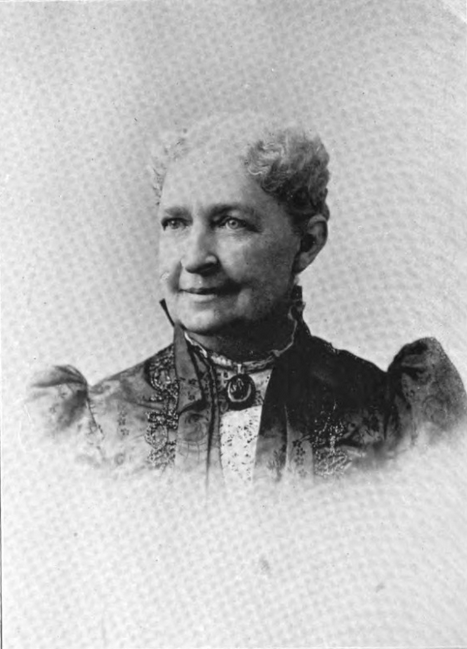
- "A Woman of the Century"
- Born: Sarah Minerva Brace; January 7, 1837; Rochester, New York, U.S.
- Died: October 2, 1894 (aged 57); Beloit, Wisconsin, U.S.
- Education: Milwaukee College; Baraboo Female Seminary
- Occupations: educator; writer
- Spouse: Smith Norton (m. 1867)
- Relatives: Frances Willard (cousin)
- Writing career
- Genre: contributor to periodical literature

Minerva Brace Norton (née, Brace; January 7, 1837 - October 2, 1894) was an American educator and writer. She was from her early youth until her last days a constant contributor to periodical literature. For most of her life, she also filled the role of a pastor's wife.

== Early life and education ==
Sarah Minerva Brace was born in Rochester, New York, January 7, 1837. She was of American Revolutionary and New England ancestry, the Braces, of Connecticut, and the Thompsons, of New Hampshire and Vermont. She was the daughter of Captain Harvey and Hannah Thompson Brace, New England pioneers to Wisconsin.

The family first moved to Michigan and, when she was nine years old, to Janesville, Wisconsin, where her youth was spent. Her education was received in the schools of Janesville, and under Mary Mortimer, in Milwaukee College, and in Baraboo Female Seminary from which she was graduated in 1861.

== Career ==
She spent the years of her early adulthood as a teacher in the schools where she had studied, her favorite lines of study and work being metaphysics, mathematics and history. She was assistant editor of the Little Corporal in Chicago, in 1866, and subsequently did considerable editorial work.

She married Rev. Smith Norton, April 18, 1867, Congregational minister. She devoted most of the years of her married life to domestic and parish duties. For 27 years, she a leader in the work of that church, especially home and foreign missions. Her work extended from New Hampshire to Dakota Territory, and its record is found in part of the book entitled Service in the King's Guards, the joint work of herself and husband. She also served as secretary of the Woman's Board of Missions, Boston, Massachusetts, in 1876 and 1877.

This period was varied by teaching, from 1871 to 1874, in the Evanston College for Ladies, Evanston, Illinois, and as principal of the ladies' department of Ripon College, from 1874 to 1876. She traveled from 1886 to 1888 in England, Scotland, Denmark, Norway, Sweden, Russia, Germany, France, Austria, Switzerland and Italy, after which she wrote In and Around Berlin (1889). In 1890, she was again abroad, traveling with her husband in England, France, Belgium and Holland.

Norton was a correspondent for several journals, including the Andover Review. She wrote and published many articles on various topics during the last quarter of the 19th century in periodicals, including the Independent, Christian Union, New York Observer, New York Evangelist, Congregationalism, Advance, Sunday-School Times, Journal of Education, Education, and Wide Awake. In addition to Service in the King's Guards and In and Around Berlin (Chicago, 1889), she also wrote A True Teacher and the Life of Miss Mortimer, and was one of the editors of the cyclopedia entitled A Woman of the Century. Norton collaborated with her cousin, Frances Willard, on the life of Willard's mother, entitled A Great Mother.

== Death and legacy ==
Norton made her home in Beloit, Wisconsin, and died there on October 2, 1894, after a lingering illness. She was survived by her husband, a son, James, and a daughter.

Her papers are held in the collections of the Western Reserve Historical Society.

== Selected works ==
- In and Around Berlin (1889)
- Service in the King's Guards (with Rev. Smith Norton, 1891)
- A great mother; sketches of Madam Willard (1894)
- A true teacher; Mary Mortimer, a memoir (1894)
- A Great Mother
