= Le Roy House and Union Free School =

Historic buildings in New York, United States

- U.S. National Register of Historic Places
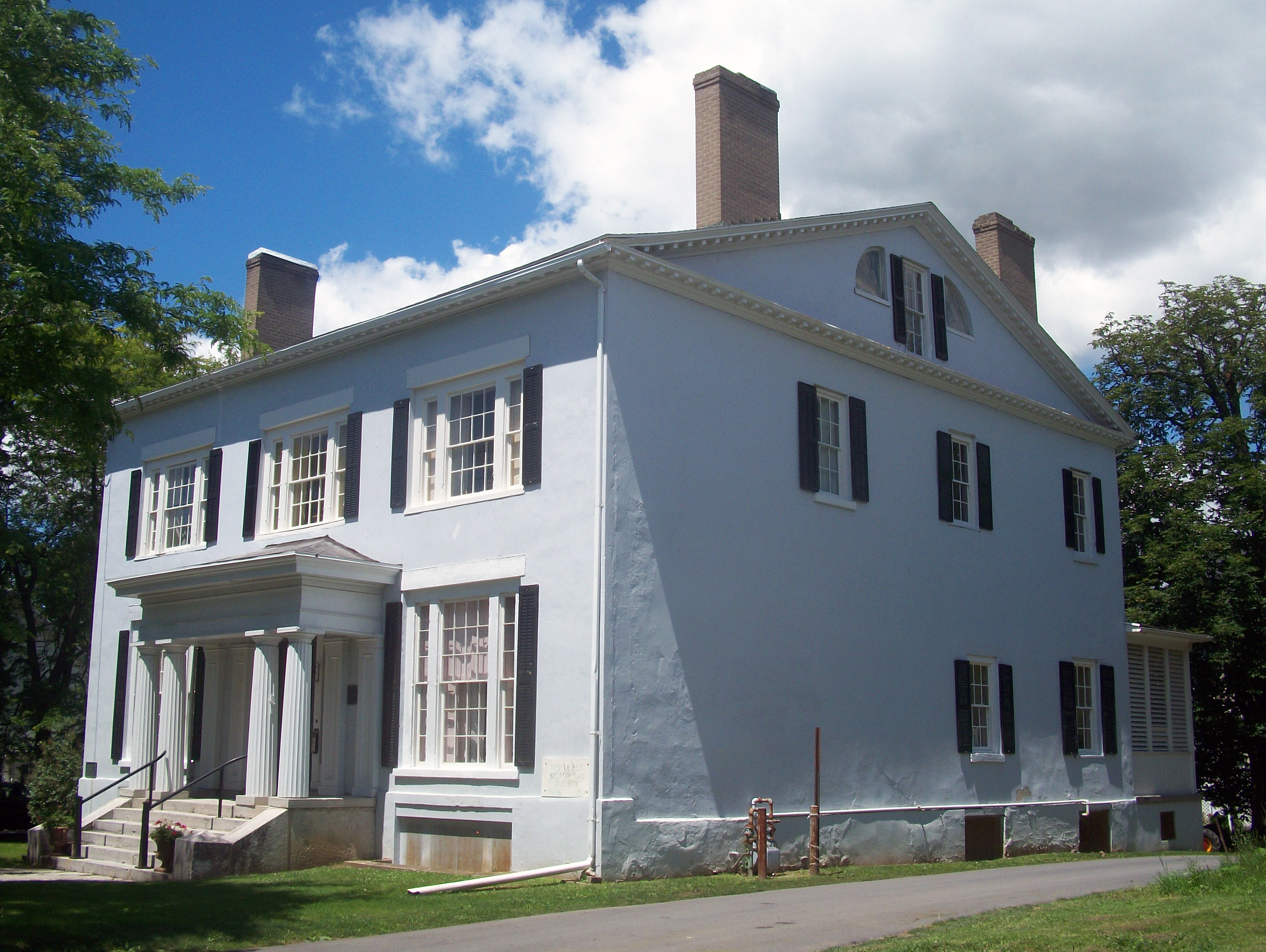
- South elevation and east profile of house, 2010

- Location within New York Location within the United States
- Interactive map showing the location of Le Roy House and Union Free School
- Location: Le Roy, NY
- Nearest city: Batavia
- Coordinates: 42°58′42″N 77°59′08″W
- Area: 3 acres (1.2 ha)
- Built: 1823, 1898
- Architectural style: Greek Revival, Late Victorian
- NRHP reference No.: 97001388
- Added to NRHP: November 7, 1997

The Le Roy House and Union Free School are located on East Main Street (New York State Route 5) in Le Roy, New York, United States. The house is a stucco-faced stone building in the Greek Revival architectural style. It was originally a land office, expanded in two stages during the 19th century by its builder, Jacob Le Roy, an early settler for whom the village is named. In the rear of the property is the village's first schoolhouse, a stone building from the end of the 19th century.

Le Roy expanded the small land office into a large house, with finely decorated interior. After its completion, he hosted the reception following Daniel Webster's second marriage, to one of Le Roy's sisters. Later it served as a residence for educational administrators of both Ingham University and the local public schools. During the late 19th century it was subdivided into a boardinghouse for faculty and students at Ingham and the Le Roy Academic Institute, an early secular private school. Upon the establishment of the Le Roy Historical Society in 1941 it became the local historical museum.

The school was originally an addition built on a frame building, first for the Le Roy Academic Institute and then the local public school district, which it served as a high school. Its educational use ended in the early 20th century. For several decades afterward it was used as a factory for the manufacture of patent medicines. Since the 1940s it has been a property of the historical society.

== Museums ==
The Le Roy House is today owned by the Le Roy Historical Society and operated as historic house museum, with 19th century period rooms, a room with Morganville Pottery items, and exhibits of local history.

The school has also been converted into the Jell-O Gallery, devoted to the history and marketing of Jell-O, which was invented and first manufactured in Le Roy.

== Buildings and grounds ==
Both buildings are located on a 3-acre (1.2 ha) lot along the north side of East Main Street, 500 feet (150 m) east of Oatka Creek. Across the street is a small park and Le Roy's current elementary school, built in the early 20th century. The surrounding neighborhood is otherwise mostly residential, with other large houses from the 19th century and the First Baptist Church at the creek. The deep lot has the house on the street, followed by a small parking lot, the school and a Little League baseball field in the very rear. A line of trees delineates the property boundaries.

In 1997 both buildings were listed on the National Register of Historic Places.

=== House ===
The house is a two-and-a-half-story stucco-faced limestone structure with a raised foundation and side-gabled roof shingled in asphalt. Two brown brick chimneys with concrete caps pierce it at either end. The roofline has broad overhanging eaves on the north and south and a dentilled pedimented cornice on the east and west. On the north (rear) elevation is a full-width one-story porch on a concrete foundation with limestone steps. Its hipped roof is supported by round Tuscan columns and louvered panels at the sides.

==== Exterior ====
Its south (front) facade frames the centrally located main entrance in a hip roofed portico with classical entablature supported by paired fluted Doric columns with indented capitals. All windows on the facade are tripartite, with 12-over-12 double-hung sash flanked by three-over-three sidelights on the first story complemented by eight-over-eight and two-over-two on the second. All have plain lintels and wooden shutters for the sidelights. At the basement level a window on the west side provides light; the corresponding opening on the east has been bricked in.

The side elevations are asymmetrically fenestrated, reflecting the house's phased expansion. Both have a six-over-six window flanked by quarter-round windows in the pediments. On the east are three six-over-six windows in the northern bays, and two on the first in the two northernmost bays. The west face's second story is fully fenestrated, but with an eight-over-eight in the second bay from north dropped a half-story. Below it, the first story has, from the south, a six-over-six, eight-over-eight, six-over-six and four-over-four, all with stone sills. The north elevation has tripartite windows like those on the opposite face surrounding the rear entrance, a six-panel door with narrow six-light sidelights and four-light transom. The second story has three six-over-six windows aligned with the first-story windows.

==== Interior ====
Paired paneled pilasters flank the six-light sidelights aside the main entrance, topped by another four-light transom. The six-panel wooden door opens into a 53-foot (16 m) central hall running the depth of the house. In the middle an elliptical arch with molded soffit panels and reeded wood trim and keystones. A similar arch on the adjacent wall leads into the stair hall. Flooring throughout the first story is four-inch (10 cm) wooden board with the plaster walls covered by reproduction wallpaper.

On either side of the center hall are two large rooms. The southwest room is decorated to approximate the building's original function as a land office. Wooden shutters for the 12-over-12 at the center of the tripartite window are on the adjacent interior walls. The doors and windows have reed surrounds with molded corner blocks. The west wall's fireplace mantel has a classical entablature, Doric columns and a glazed brick hearth. Next to the chimney breast are French doors leading into the northwest room. A closed portion in the northeast corner houses the original circular stairway.

The northwest room is currently the Le Roy Historical Society's office. Another six-panel wooden door with molded surround opens into it from the center hall. Its west wall fireplace has a wood mantel with reeded pilasters and molded square corner blocks. To its north a built-in bookcase spans the wall. The east wall has a kitchen unit, and the room is floored in linoleum.

East of the center hall, the two parlors have the greatest degree of decoration. The smaller southeast one has ornate wooden surrounds and plaster cornice moldings at the ceiling. The tripartite window is recessed and flanked by fluted pilasters. On the east the fireplace mantel has a classical entablature and engaged Ionic columns.

A ten-foot-wide (3 m) cased opening separates the two eastern parlors. It has some of the same decorative motifs seen elsewhere on the first floor, such as reed molding and molded corner blocks, along with a molded inset panel at the center. From the front, a classical entablature and Tuscan columns frame the view to the tripartite window in the rear. Along its sides, lined with shallow molded wood paneling, are shallow closets.

In the northeast parlor, the tripartite window is similarly recessed and flanked by pilasters. The fireplace mantel has an inset molded panel, classical entablature and engaged Tuscan columns. On either side are the six-over-six windows with reeded pilaster finish and molded corner blocks. Another six-panel wooden door opens into the center hall.

On the second floor, an identical arch spans the center hall south of the top of the stair. The decoration is more restrained, with simpler door and window surrounds and a ceiling medallion in the north section of the hall made of concentric circles. The same wide flooring planks are used everywhere on the floor except for the bathroom. All rooms are accessed by six-paneled wooden doors with half-glazing consisting of hand-painted frosted glass depicting landscapes, ruins, birds or animals.

A storage space has been created from part of the southeast bedroom, which has a fireplace with plain wood mantel. It is currently used to exhibit a collection of period children's toys. The similar bedroom across the hall is now used as a research library. Its northeast corner has also been partitioned to create a bathroom with wooden wainscoting along its walls.

The largest of the second floor bathrooms, the northeast one, has a fireplace with a Federal style mantel featuring classical entablature, inset molded panel and flanking pilasters. The molding on the door surround is the most detailed of any on the floor. It is currently used for storage. The bedroom across the hall has period furnishings and is used as an exhibit. Its mantel is similar.

Upstairs, the third floor is closed to the public and used for storage of collection material not currently on exhibit. It has a center hall dividing three small rooms on the west side from a large ballroom on the east. A small alcove projects from the west side of that room. There is extra storage space beneath the eaves on the north and south. The walls and ceilings are done in plaster.

From the rear of the stair hall on the first floor, another set of stairs leads down to the basement. It, too, has a center hall with six rooms. Three are open to the public and used for exhibits. In the southeast is a kitchen exhibit, in accordance with the bake oven in the open fireplace and open shelving along the east and north walls. It has a stone floor, plaster walls, and wooden shiplap ceiling.

In the southwest corner of the basement is the oldest room in the house, used for cold storage. It has a stone floor and vaulted brick ceiling, with walls of mortared limestone. To its north is a smaller vaulted room with a brick vault on the main floor, formerly the site of the cistern that collected rainwater from the roof.

The northwest room houses a ceramics exhibit, and has exposed blue shale in its west wall. Opposite, in the northeast, is the boiler room. The remaining room, in the center of the west side below the stairwell, is a small bathroom.

School building exterior

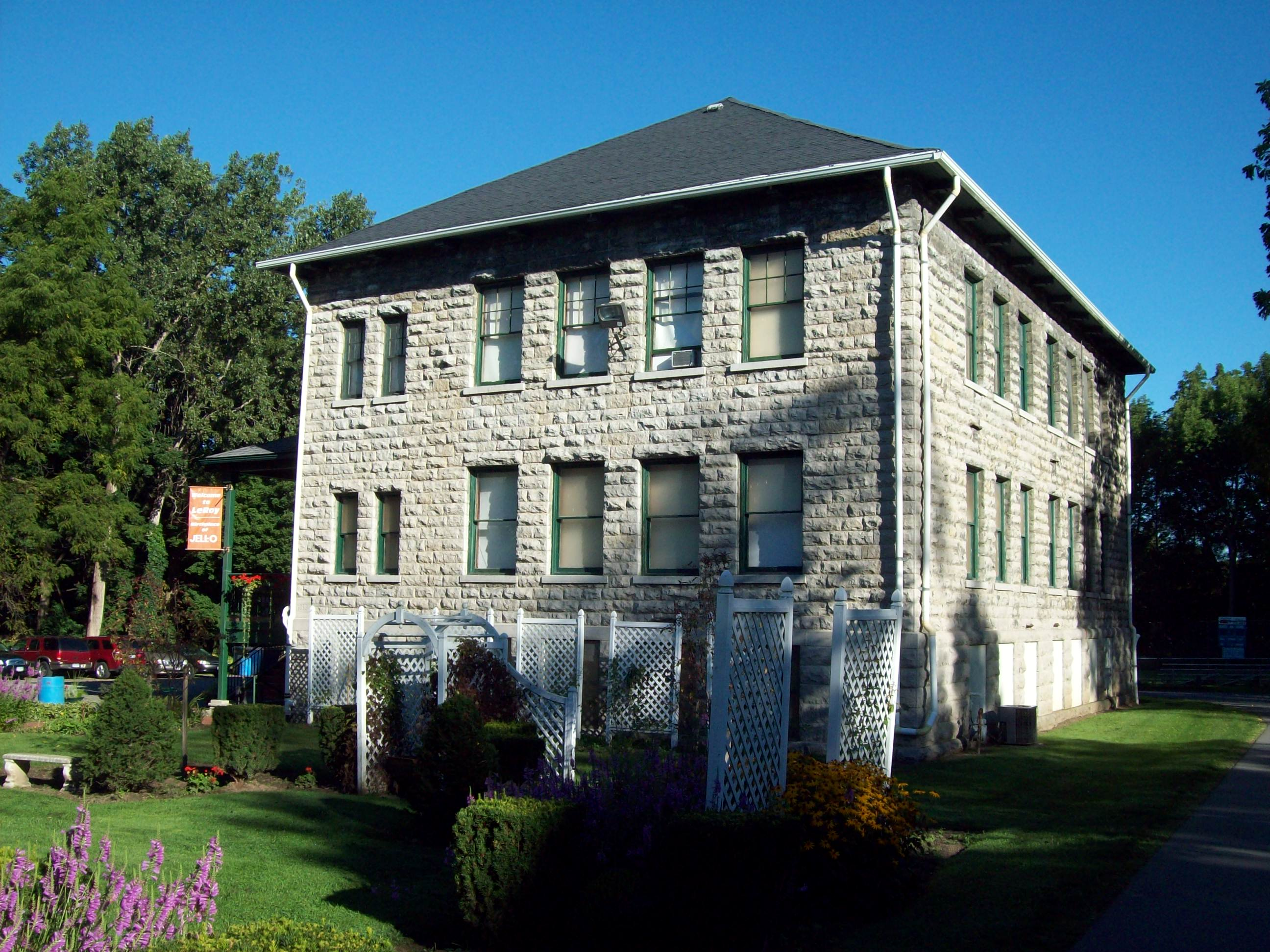
South profile and east elevation

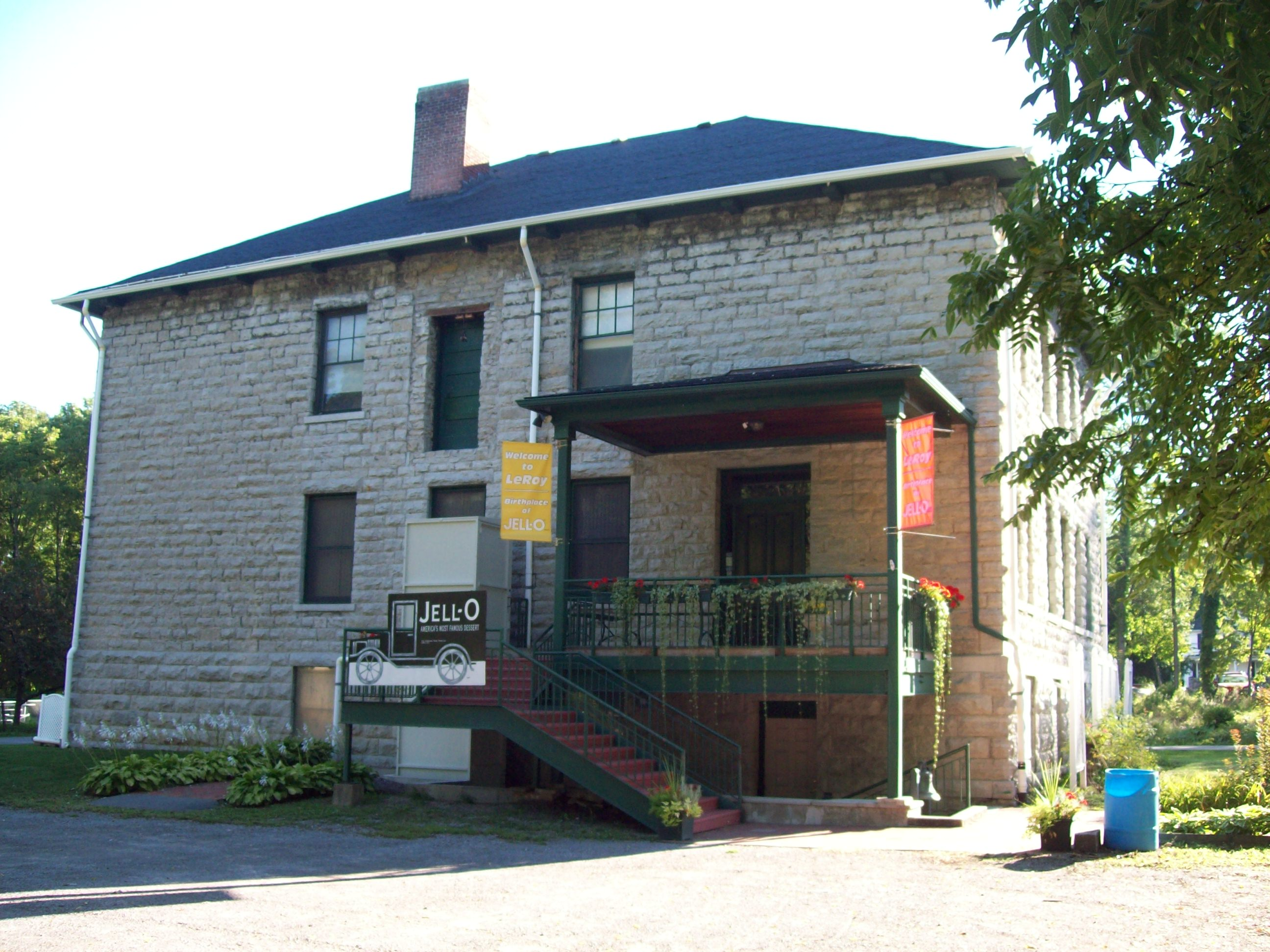
West elevation

=== School ===
The school building is a three-story five-by-eight-bay limestone building with wooden interior framing. It is topped by an asphalt hipped roof with flared eaves and exposed rafter tails. Its raised basement has larger blocks and is separated by a water table.

At the south end of the west elevation is the current main entrance. It has a porch with a concrete deck, metal staircase and guiderails. Its roof is done in beaded wood paneling similar to that once used inside the school. The surrounding masonry work is different since the door was added later. Fenestration on that side consists of three aligned pairs of double-hung sash windows, one-over-one at the basement and first story, and two six-over-ones flanking a wooden door on the second.

On the east (rear) are aligned windows, likewise six one-over-one on the first story and seven six-over-one on the second. The basement windows have been bricked in, as has the first-story window at the north end. The same pattern of six-over-one above one-over-one obtains on the north side, with the three windows to the west being narrower. At the first story's northeast corner is a secondary entrance with a vinyl siding enclosure. It leads to the basement. The south, the side facing the street, is similar to the other faces except for having two narrow windows in the westernmost bay. All its windows have rock-faced lintels and smooth sills.

==== Interior ====
The paneled main entrance door, with single-light sidelights and transom, opens into a hall running along the west side. It is currently used as a gift shop and admission area for the museum. In the wider central portion of the hall is the freestanding chimney, its breast faced in plaster, with turned wooden cornerbeads and beaded fir wainscoting. A small administrative office is in the southwest corner.

Next to it, on the southeast, is the 832-square-foot (77.3 m^{2}) main exhibit room. The natural light from the windows is supplemented by modern track lighting on the beaded fir ceiling. The beaded fir wainscoting, ceiling and floor are original but have been refinished; the door to the west hall has been removed. A sliding track door opens into the northeast room, currently used for storage. It has similar finishes, and a non-functional freight lift on the east wall.

Also on the east wall, a five-panel door opens into the closed stair along the east wall. A small storage room in the northwest corner is accessed from this space, divided from the main hall by a partially glazed wall on the south. The stair itself, located behind another paneled door at the north end of the entrance hall, is lit by the windows on that elevation. The dogleg stair itself has simple square balusters, a molded top round rail and square newel.

Upstairs, another west hallway with a small room in the southwest corner gives access to three rooms of nearly equal size. All have paneled doors leading to the hallway, and each other. The finishes on this level are all original; none have been renovated.

The northeast room is slightly larger than the other two. It has the upper level of the freight lift, and a beaded-front cabinet below the window on the east wall. On the north wall is a steam radiator. The plaster has been removed on the south and east walls near the chimney, exposing the lath beneath. The chimney itself is in the northwest corner. In the south room the original blackboards remain on either side of the door on the north wall. Plaster has been stripped from that wall as well. Another steam radiator is along the south wall.

The basement has brick walls and a wood floor over concrete. Due to accumulated moisture over the years some of the wood has rotted, and the brick facing has been damaged. It is used for the storage of vehicles and other large items.

== History ==
The house originated with a land office from the earliest days of Le Roy's settlement, a building still structurally part of the house. After Jacob Le Roy expanded it considerably, its use as a single-family house lasted until the Civil War, when it was subdivided to become a boarding house. Since 1941 it has been the historical society's property.

The school was original the west wing of an earlier frame structure, demolished in the 20th century. After being closed down, it was used as a factory for several decades.

=== 1793–1817:Settlement of Le Roy ===
After the Revolutionary War, Robert Morris bought the land west of the Genesee River which now makes up Western New York from the state of Massachusetts. Most of this he later sold to the Holland Land Company, but in 1793 the New York firm of LeRoy & Bayard acquired 87,000 acres (35,000 ha) from him. Because of its shape, stretching from the current village of Le Roy to the shores of Lake Ontario and widening to the north, it was called the Triangle Tract.

The intersection of Oatka Creek with a popular Iroquois trail was an obvious place to establish a settlement, and four years after the Triangle Tract was purchased a man named Charles Arthur built a log cabin on the north side of what is now Main Street, just east of the future village's municipal boundary. He sold it a year later to a Capt. John Ganson, who expanded it into a tavern. Other settlers came, attracted by the fertile soils of the Oatka valley, and three years later, in 1802, the first bridge was built over the creek.

In 1813 the community was named after Herman Le Roy, senior partner in the landowning firm and former director of the Bank of the United States. He bought more land south of the Triangle Tract's tip, a purchase known as the Five Hundred Acre Tract, to attract more settlers. When the land was fully surveyed in 1817, he sent his nephew Egbert Benson Jr. to Le Roy to serve as the company's agent.

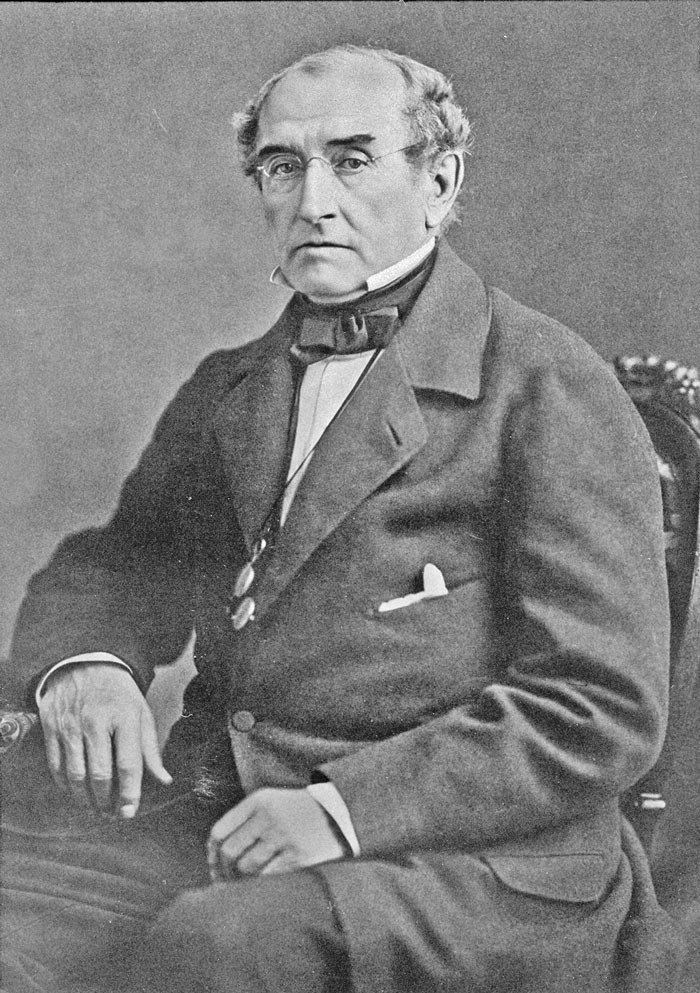
Jacob Le Roy

=== 1818–47: Initial construction and residence ===
The two-story brick building Benson had constructed on the site of the current house is its earliest section. At that time it had an entrance on the west (now a window) and a narrow circular stair to the garret. An adjoining room to the north had a vaulted ceiling. The basement had the extant cistern and cold storage.

Four years later, in 1821, the community had been subdivided into lots and was thriving, with mills and other industries being established. Jacob Le Roy, a son of Herman's who had traveled abroad learning the family business after studies at Yale, replaced his cousin as company agent. Two years later he bought the land office building and began expanding it into a house for himself and his family.

By 1823 it had reached its current size. Le Roy had added a two-story addition to the rear, doubling the interior, and the attic story. The new section was reportedly modeled after New York City townhouses of the era. Fruit trees and flowering shrubs were planted around the house at this time. Six years later, in 1829, Le Roy hosted the reception after Daniel Webster's wedding to one of his sisters.

The last of the Triangle Tract lots was sold by 1837, and the land office was formally closed. In the 1840s the front portico was added, giving the house its strong Greek Revival character. The stucco facing, added some time after the rear was built, further unified the house's appearance. After the company's decision to raise prices on some former Holland properties it had acquired met with widespread local resistance in some areas and violence against one of the company's other offices, Jacob sold the house to Alfred Bartow and returned to New York City. He died there in 1847.

=== 1848–91: Ingham Seminary ===
Bartow built the rear veranda. He replaced the original interior doors with the decorative glass-paneled ones currently in use sometime during the 1840s and '50s. He also oversaw extensive additions to the grounds, such as large barns, expanded gardens, and the replacement of a stone wall with iron filigreed gate posts. Two drives on either side made a circle around the veranda. In 1856 he moved out.

In 1837, Mariette and Emily Ingham had established the Le Roy Female Seminary in a nearby house. Its first chancellor, Dr. Samuel Hanson Cox, lived in the Le Roy House during his tenure. His development of the school's curriculum led it to become Ingham Collegiate Institute and then Ingham University in 1857. During the 1860s pipelines were laid to the house to provide gas for heating and lighting.

Citizens of the village, including Bartow, established the non-sectarian LeRoy Academic Institute in 1864 in a small building on Main Street. Within a year, it had outgrown that space, and the institute's trustees bought the Le Roy House from Cox. They built a two-story wood frame school on the site of the present school, with enough space for 250 students.

The house itself was used to board faculty and some students. The interior was altered extensively during this period. Signs of former partitions remain on the floors of the large bedrooms upstairs, and the irregular fenestration of the side elevations also reflects this subdivision of the interior space. During the 1880s the basement kitchen was remodeled, with the shiplap ceiling added and the original fireplace and bake oven bricked shut.

=== 1890–1941: School and factory ===
In 1890, four small rural school districts in the area were consolidated into the Le Roy Union Free School District, the precursor of today's Le Roy Central School District. The following year the new district's trustees voted to acquire the house and school from the institute for $10,000 ($358,000 in contemporary dollars). The institute's trustees in turn voted to dissolve it. Seven years later, in 1898, the school district built a stone addition, the extant building, onto the frame building.

By 1904 it had been renamed Le Roy Union High School. Its student population soon outgrew this space, and seven years later the current Le Roy Junior/Senior High School was built across Main Street and Trigon Park. The old school's last year was 1911; it has not been used for educational purposes since.

The house and school were bought by Allen Olmsted, owner of a local company that manufactured patent medicines, primarily Allen's Foot-Ease powder. He allowed the school district to use the house as a residence for its administrator until a local historical society was organized. The school building he converted into a factory and offices. The basement was used for grinding and mixing; the first story as offices. A freight lift was installed, and a second-story passage built between the stone and wood buildings.

=== 1941–present: Museum ===
In 1941 the local historical society was finally established and took title to the house, restoring the bake oven and brick hearth in the basement kitchen soon afterwards. Olmsted's company was bought by Buffalo-based Foster-Milburn two years later. It continued manufacturing operations in Le Roy for another two years, then moved them to Buffalo. When it did, it transferred the remainder of the property to the historical society.

The last change to the house was made in 1958. The rear porch was reconstructed since the original stone wall had deteriorated. It was replaced with a concrete wall. The windows were removed and the space beneath the porch entirely enclosed.

The wooden west wing that had served as the original school in the 1860s was demolished in 1962. A new roof and gutter were installed in 1985, and Lexan and wire cloth were added to the basement windows to protect against damage from stray balls on the nearby softball field, also used for Little League. Further renovations were made in 1996 in anticipation of an exhibit on the centenary of Jell-O. This included the installation of electricity, a security system and refinishings of the exhibit rooms on the first floor, including the installation of modern track lighting.

== See also ==
- National Register of Historic Places listings in Genesee County, New York
