= Pauline Root =

American physician (1859-1944)

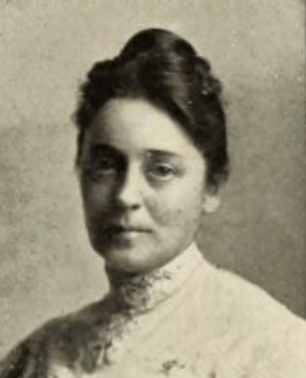
- Mary Pauline Root, from the 1907 yearbook of Smith College
- Born: Mary Pauline Root; May 22, 1859; Providence, Rhode Island, U.S.
- Died: July 10, 1944 (aged 85); Christmas Cove, Maine, U.S.
- Occupations: Physician, missionary, educator

Mary Pauline Root (May 22, 1859 – July 10, 1944) was an American physician, missionary, and educator. She established a women's hospital in southern India and was resident physician at Smith College.

== Early life and education ==
Root was born in Providence, Rhode Island, the daughter of Henry Theodore Root and Mary Evelyn Lake Root. She graduated from Ingham University and from the Woman's Medical College of Pennsylvania in 1883. She pursued further medical training at Cornell Medical School in 1906.

== Career ==
Root was the first woman to be a resident physician at the Philadelphia's Blockley Hospital, and the first woman physician to become a missionary with the American Board of Commissioners for Foreign Missions. In 1885 she went to Madurai in southern India, to establish and run the American Hospital for Women and Children. Her missionary service ended in 1896. She lectured about her work in India during furloughs, and for years after she left the foreign mission field.

Root lectured for the Student Volunteer Missionary Movement in 1902. She was the resident physician at Smith College from 1906 to 1909, and taught hygiene classes there. She was resident physician at the Bennett School in Millbrook, New York, from 1909 to 1910. During and after World War I she was a lecturer for the YWCA and the Bureau of Indian Affairs, traveling extensively in the United States to speak on social hygiene.

== Publications ==
- "Letter from Dr. Pauline Root" (1892)
- "Japan" (1892)
- "Japan: The Women's Bible Training School in Kobe" (1892)
- "The Kindergarten in Kobe, Japan" (1892)
- "Young Women in India—A Letter to Mothers" (1892)
- "India; Contrasts" (1892)
- "Memories of Medical Work" (1895)

== Personal life and legacy ==
Root died in 1944, in Christmas Cove, Maine, at the age of 85. There is a box of her papers and photographs in the College of Medicine Legacy Center of Drexel University. Educator and physician Mary Pauline Jeffery was born to missionary parents in India in 1893, and was named for Root.
