= Emma May Alexander Reinertsen =

American writer

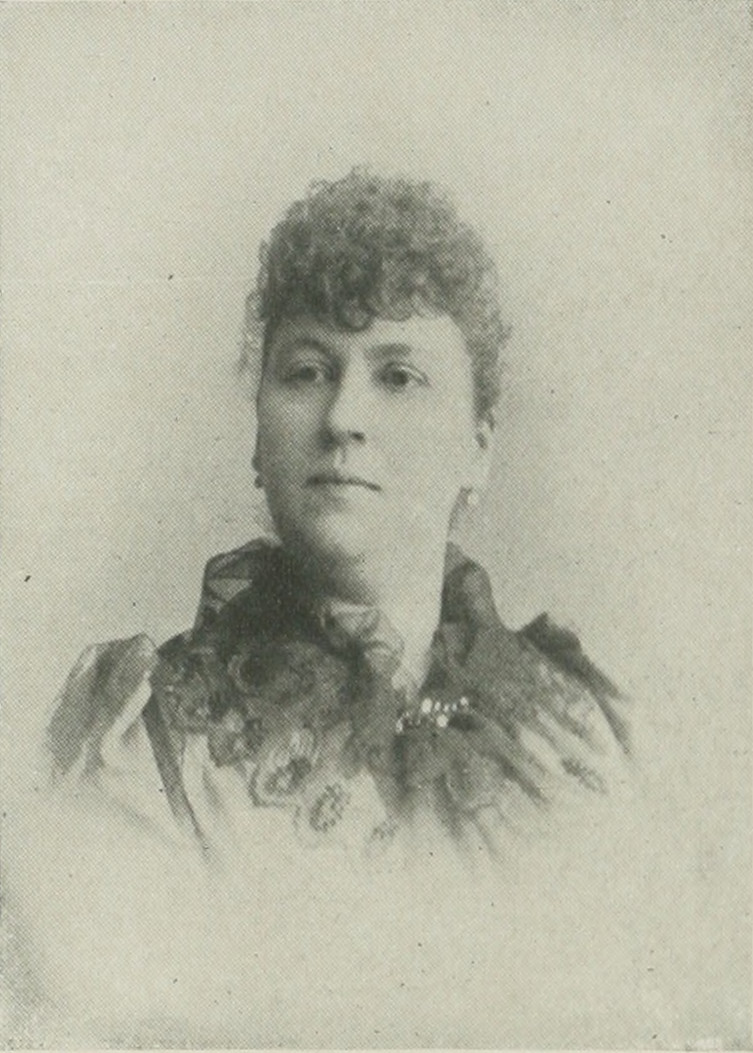
- "A Woman of the Century"
- Born: Emma May Alexander; January 6, 1853; Buffalo, New York, U.S.
- Died: March 22, 1920 (aged 67)
- Education: Milwaukee-Downer College
- Occupations: writer; social reformer
- Spouse: Robert C. Keinertsen (m. 1871)
- Children: 2 sons
- Relatives: William Tecumseh Sherman
- Writing career
- Pen name: Gale Forest
- Language: English
- Genres: prose sketches; opinion pieces
- Notable work: Five Cousins in California

Emma May Alexander Reinertsen (née, Alexander; pen name, Gale Forest; also known as, Mrs. R. C. Reinertsen; January 6, 1853 – March 22, 1920) was a pseudonymous American writer of prose sketches, and articles on social reform issues. As "Gale Forest", she was the author of Five Cousins in California. She also wrote about temperance and various customs such as wearing hats in theaters, and spitting in street cars and on sidewalks.

== Early life and education ==
Emma May Alexander was born in Buffalo, New York, January 6, 1853. Her father was Capt. Squire Alexander and her mother was Henrietta E. Sherman. Her great-grandfather, Peter Belknap, was a soldier in the Revolutionary War. Her grandfather, Jacob Alexander, was a soldier in the War of 1812. Her father was master of some of the largest transports in government service during the Civil War; at a bombardment of Fort Sumter by the ironclads, he was captain of the dispatch boat, Governor, which, because of her high speed, was of great service to the navy. Reinertsen's mother, a relative of General William Tecumseh Sherman, was orphaned in infancy and was adopted by Col. Samuel French, who traced his ancestry to the Mayflower.

Reinertsen came to Milwaukee, Wisconsin, when four years of age, her father having made that decision after receiving a shipbuilding patent and a portion of Jones Island. After some financial disappointments, he returned to his life on the sea, where he died and was buried.

Reinertsen was educated in public and private schools in Milwaukee. She was for some time a student at the Milwaukee Female College. She dropped out of the College in what would have been her final year, in order to get married.

== Career ==
Using the pen name "Gale Forest", Reinertsen built a reputation beyond her local region. Her sketches were characterized as "bright with wit and condensed wisdom". Called the Fanny Fern of the West as an indication of her literary style, her writing, though not voluminous, had merit.

Her early writing efforts appeared in The Cincinnati Times. She was also a contributor to the Chicago Tribune , Christian Union (renamed, The Outlook) Good Cheer, as well as the Milwaukee Wisconsin, Sentinel, Telegraph, and the Milwaukee Monthly Magazine. One of her best sketches, "A Forbidden Topic", was incorporated in Osgood Eaton Fuller's 1884 book entitled Brave Men and Women: Their Struggles, Failures and Triumphs.

Published in 1909, Five Cousins in California was a children's book set in Pasadena, California.

Reinertsen also wrote on social reform issues. In 1873, she began addressing the topic of temperance, particularly the custom of children being allowed to carry beer from saloons to homes and shops. One of her later articles on the subject was forwarded to Mark Twain, who highly commended it and was strongly in favor of the reform. Reinertsen was the first in the "West" to protest against the wearing of hats in theaters. From that reform came a movement to remove hats in all churches. Two other reforms were credited to her, that of the custom of spitting in street cars and spitting on the sidewalk. Eventually, an ordinance was secured in Milwaukee, and thereafter, hundreds of cities and villages passed laws against the custom of spitting on sidewalks.

She was a member of the Daughters of the American Revolution, National Society United States Daughters of 1812, College Endowment Association, and the Milwaukee Outdoor Art Association.

== Personal life ==
On October 18, 1871, she married Robert C. Reinertsen (1846–1923), a civil engineer of Milwaukee. The couple had two sons, Rex and Don. Her son Rex was killed in September 1907 when he suffered a fractured skull after being thrown from an automobile, aged 30.

Emma May Alexander Reinertsen died on March 22, 1920, in Wisconsin, aged 67.

== Selected works ==
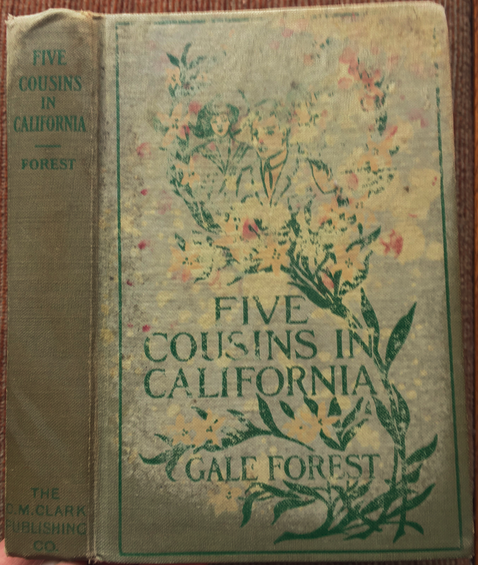
Five Cousins in California (1909)

=== Books ===
- Five Cousins in California (1909)

=== Sketches ===
- "A Girl's Soliloquy in Church" (1874)
- "How to Keep Your Husband's Love" (1876)
- "How To Keep Your Wife's Love" (1876)
- "For Whom the Boot Fits" (1878)
- "My Neighbors" (1881)
- "How They Meet and Part" (1881)
- "A Forbidden Topic" (1884)
- "The Model Husband" (1886)
- "The Model Authoress" (1887)
- "My Experience With Christian Science" (1887)
