= Marion Juliet Mitchell =

American poet (1836–1917)

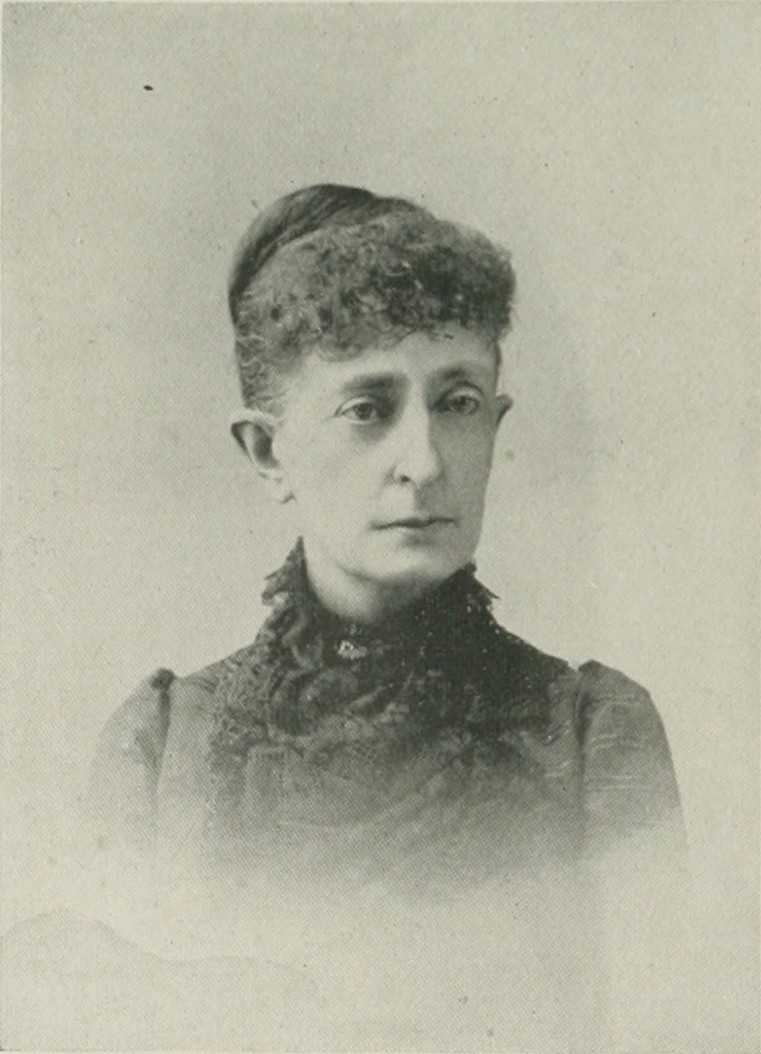
- Photo in A Woman of the Century
- Born: September 4, 1836; Buffalo, New York, U.S.
- Died: January 30, 1917 (aged 80); Janesville, Wisconsin
- Resting place: Oak Hill Cemetery, Janesville
- Education: Emma Willard School; Ingham Collegiate Institute
- Occupation: poet

Marion Juliet Mitchell (September 4, 1836 – January 30, 1917) was an American poet and educator who contributed prose and verse to magazines. Her poems also appeared in several standard collections. She was the author of the Mitchell Book of Poems.

== Biography ==
Marion Juliet Mitchell was born in Buffalo, New York, September 4, 1836. Her father, Dr. John Mitchell, died in 1885), and her mother died in 1888. She went with her parents to Wisconsin, and the family settled in Janesville, Wisconsin, which was then a small village. One of the best of her earlier poems, "My Grandmother's Home," is a memorial of several happy years which she passed in childhood with her grandparents, Hon. Isaac Lacey and wife, near Rochester, New York.

She attended school in Rochester, and went afterwards to the Ingham Collegiate Institute (later named Ingham University), in Le Roy, New York. She finished with a thorough course at the Emma Willard School, in Troy, New York.

Mitchell inherited literary tastes from her parents. Most of her poetic work shows matured powers of imagination and expression. Quiet and domestic in her tastes, she cared little for what was generally termed society. She was surrounded by a circle of congenial friends, and her life was passed in good works and the reading of literature. The Mitchell Book of Poems was brought out by Mitchell and her father.

Marion Juliet Mitchell died January 30, 1917, in Janesville, Wisconsin, and was buried in that city's Oak Hill Cemetery.

== Selected works ==
- Mitchell Book of Poems
