= Jell-O Gallery =

Jell-O Gallery or Jell-O Museum
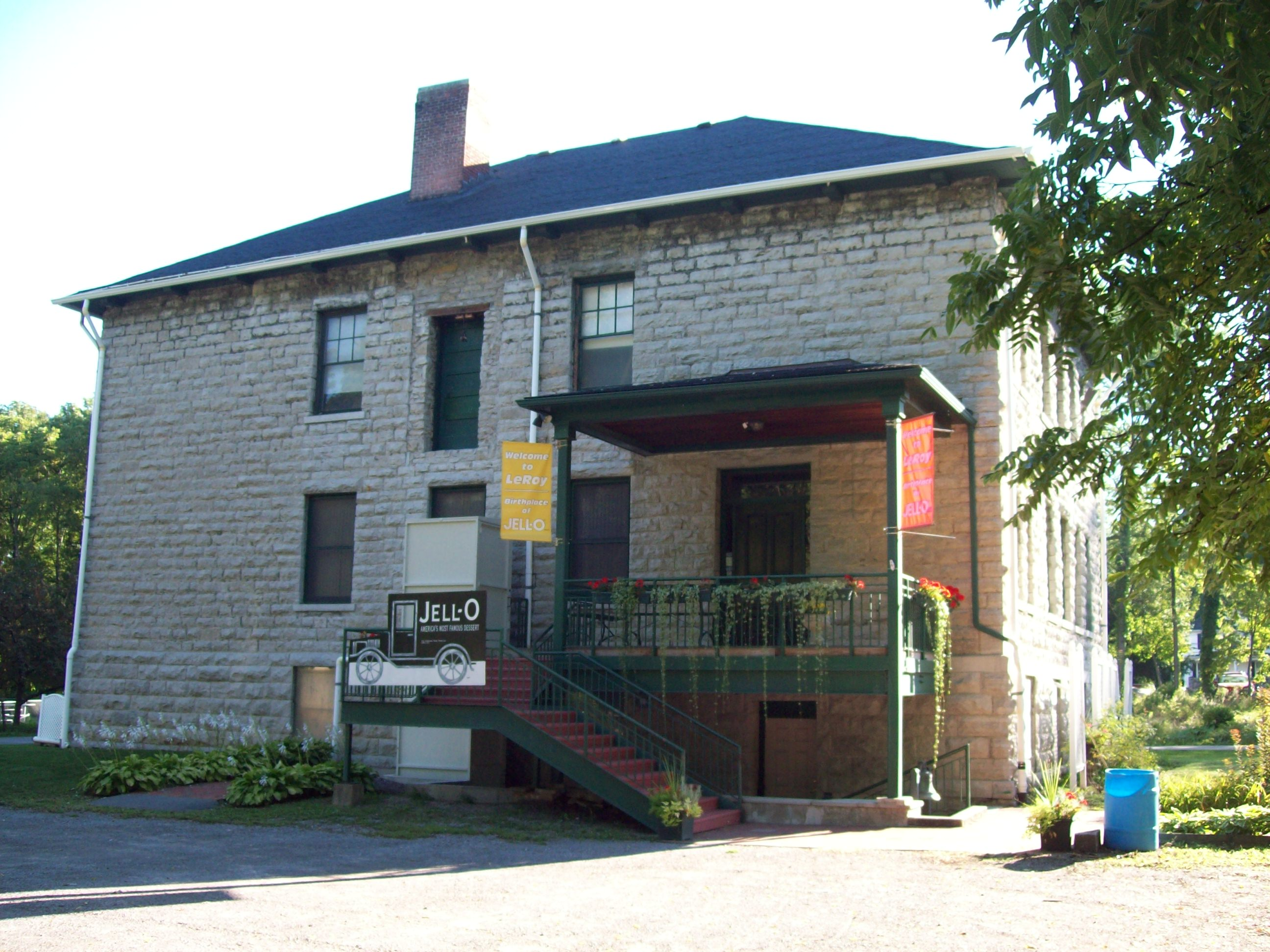
- The Jell-O Museum in Le Roy, New York
- Coordinates: 42.97884°N 77.98574°W
- Type: Specialized
- Website: www.jellogallery.org

The Jell-O Gallery or Jell-O Museum is a museum in Le Roy, New York dedicated to exhibits about Jell-O. The museum is owned and operated by the Le Roy Historical Society.

== History ==
The museum is currently located behind the Le Roy House within the sole remaining building of the Union Free School. The original Union Free School was built in the 1860s to educate both girls and boys in English and the classics. In 1898, the stone building was erected on the site to accommodate the growing number of pupils in the district. By 1911, a new high school was built across the street and both buildings were auctioned off. By 1945, the property was given to the newly formed Le Roy Historical Society. The original wooden structure was razed in the 1962, but the stone building remained and was used for storage.

By 1996, the Le Roy Historical Society decided to renovate the old stone building and host the travelling “There’s Always Room for Jell-O” exhibit for the Jell-O Jubilee. The exhibit remained on display from June 1, 1997 through with the end of September. In May 1998, the museum accepted the exhibit for permanent display.

== Exhibits ==
The museum currently hosts a variety of advertising art, including several original oil paintings from the early 1900s. Hundreds of Jell-O collectibles, including Jell-O spoons, toys, boxes, recipe books, and memorabilia, are on display. Displays include information about the history of Jell-O, Jell-O advertising, and Jell-O fun facts. A tour guide is available to give a brief introduction on the history of Jell-O in Le Roy.

In 2006, a new exhibit entitled “On the Road: A Century of Ruts, Dust, and Macadam” opened on the ground floor of the museum. Several horse-drawn wagons, an ox cart, and 1908 Cadillac are included in the collection of eleven vehicles.

A brick sidewalk, entitled the Jell-O Brick Road, was installed in 1996 leading from the Le Roy House to the Jell-O Gallery. Many of the bricks are engraved with the names of prominent historical Le Royans, Jell-O employees, and Le Roy residents There is also a Little League field on the property, located behind the museum.

A gift shop, offering T-shirts, sweatshirts, magnets, molds, Jell-O collectibles, and a variety of other items is located adjacent to the exhibit room.

== Research ==
The building also has a large research library. There, museum staff process research requests on genealogy, town information, and Jell-O history.

== See also ==
- Le Roy, New York
- Le Roy House and Union Free School
