= Samuel Sterling Sherman =

American educator (1815–1914)

Samuel Sterling Sherman (c. 1815–1914), also known as S.S. Sherman, was an American educator. He was born in Vermont in about 1815, educated at Middlebury College, and later was a tutor at the University of Alabama. He taught at Alabama, and served as sometimes librarian, with Frederick Augustus Porter Barnard and Basil Manly Sr. Sherman was a co-founder of Howard College in Marion, Alabama (now Samford University of Birmingham, Alabama). As president, he delivered an address to students at Howard College that was published in 1850. Sherman later was founder of a preparatory school in Georgia. As the sectional tensions heightened, and secession loomed, Sherman moved his family to Wisconsin, where he had a second career as an educator.
