= Mary Mortimer =

British-born American educator

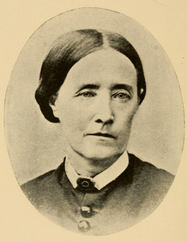
Mary Mortimer

signature

Mary Mortimer (December 2, 1816 – July 14, 1877) was a British-born American educator. She served as principal of the Milwaukee Female College and other women's educational institutions.

When just a child, Mortimer and her family emigrated from England to the United States, settling first in New York City. At the age of sixteen, Mortimer began teaching, and in 1841, became principal of the female department of the Rockport Collegiate Institute in Brockport, New York. In 1846, she became a teacher in the Le Roy Female Seminary, and in 1850, helped establish the Milwaukee Female College, in which Catharine Beecher was deeply interested. In 1852, Mortimer became one of the managers of the American Women's Educational Association. The following year, Mortimer became the principal of Milwaukee Female College. In 1857, she took management of a private school in Elmira, New York, and in 1859, went to the female seminary at Baraboo, Wisconsin, resigning in 1863 on account of ill-health. In 1866, she became once more the principal of the Milwaukee Female College, resigning and retiring in 1874. During retirement, Mortimer became a co-founder of the Woman's Club of Milwaukee, and the Wisconsin Industrial School for Girls.

== Early life and education ==
Mary Mortimer was born in Trowbridge, Wiltshire, England, December 2, 1816. Her parents, William Mortimer (1778-1829) and Mary (Pierce) (1783-1829), his wife, with a name reaching back to the time of the Plantagenets, were simple folk. She was the sixth child and fourth daughter in a family of seven children. Her family, except for her oldest brother, came to the United States when she was five years old, (Note: According to Bardeen (1901), Mortimer came with her family to America when four years old.) the voyage across the ocean taking months to complete.

The family lived at first in New York City, where the seventh and youngest child, John, was born. They afterward removed to the central part of the State, much of which was then almost a wilderness. In Cayuga County, New York, they took up residence, and finally settled on a farm, near the village of Waterloo, New York, not far from Geneva, New York. Her childhood was marked by many peculiarities that no one seemed fully to understand, and she was not a popular or pleasing child. She seldom joined playing with other children, but sought out books instead.

After a few years, the eldest son and brother joined the family in the U.S., bringing with him a wife. Not long after, in the summer of 1829, when Mortimer was twelve, both her parents were stricken with fever, and died within a week. Edmund, the eldest son and brother, became his siblings' guardian.

Mortimer attended the common schools, and for a short time the Academy at Auburn, New York, where her eldest brother, after a time, took up his residence, and in whose family she lived.

At the age of sixteen, she began to teach a country school, but the same qualities which had marked her childhood interfered with her teaching. Her nature not easily falling into the educational traditions of the time, she relinquished the work.

Relatively soon after, Mortimer and her sister, Sibyl (1813-1861), began living with a Quaker family in Scipio, New York. The home at Scipio was presided over by a matron, whom Mortimer referred to as "Aunt Susy". Having been denied better educational advantages by her older brother, Mortimer devoted all the time she could to private study. About this time, Sibyl married Lawrence S. Bannister, and this proved to be stressful for Mortimer.

During the years of unguided study and struggle, Mortimer was without religious belief. At times, she spoke of the great problems of life and destiny to her brothers and sisters, some of whom shared the same skeptical tendencies, but more often, she pondered these things silently and was deeply unhappy. But in February 1839, Mortimer went before the session of the Presbyterian Church of Geneva, presented in writing an account of her religious experience and views of doctrinal truth, and a few weeks after, was admitted to its communion.

When she reached the age when she could legally take possession of her share of the family estate, she sought better education. In 1837, she entered the Geneva Female Seminary under the management of Elizabeth Ricord in Geneva, New York, with no very definite aim beyond the longing to gratify her insatiable craving for knowledge. At the time when Mortimer entered the seminary, Ricord was temporarily absent, and the school was under the charge of Clarissa Thurston, associate principal. Mary A. Bradley, a young woman near Mortimer's own age, was also a teacher there. The friendships formed with these teachers were influential to the end of Mortimer's life. Mortimer completed the four years' course of study in only two years, finishing in 1839.

== Career ==
=== Early teaching ===
At Geneva Seminary, after she had completed her studies in 1839, she remained two years as a teacher. Her last year there was one of great suffering, and she ought to have taken a year off for recuperation. She next filled the position of Principal of the Female Department of Brockport Collegiate Institute (now The College at Brockport, State University of New York). While there, she suffered, her body seemingly full of disease, her right hand and right foot becoming nearly helpless. The winter of her second year at Brockport (1842-3) found Mortimer at the home of her sister in Phelps, New York, for a time too ill to remain in teaching. In the spring, she went to Geneva to consult a physician, and later, made a visit to her friends at Le Roy Female Seminary (now Ingham University), in Le Roy, New York. Returning to Brockport, where she spent a short time, the early summer found her again in Phelps. A mysterious lameness had settled in her right hand and foot, and which became her chief disability, involving intense suffering, and finally severing her connection with Brockport. This trouble followed her for some time, but proved not to be permanent, although her right hand and arm were never after entirely recovered, and occasionally she was under the necessity, even many years later, of writing with her left hand for months at a time.

In 1844, because of her invalid state, the inevitable decision was made to leave the Brockport school and to remove to the home of her sister, Mrs. Bannister, near Phelps, New York, for the winter of 1844–45. A few of Mortimer's pupils wished to follow her, and it was finally arranged that Mortimer's friend and associate, Miss Collier, should accompany her, and that the young ladies should be received as pupils, these with their teachers occupying a house near Mrs. Bannister. The winter of 1845–46, was spent in the home of her brother, Edmund (1805–1892), in Auburn, New York, where she home-schooled in his children. At this time, December 1845, she received an invitation to return to the charge of the ladies' department of the school in Brockport, and also one to enter Le Roy Female Seminary as an instructor. She accepted the position at Le Roy where there were 130 scholars, and nearly 70 boarders besides teachers. In early September 1848, Mortimer went to Milwaukee, Wisconsin to visit her friend and former associate at Le Roy Female Seminary, Lucy Ann Seymour Parsons. Soon after, Mortimer went onward to Chicago, there to visit former pupils and friends before proceeding to visit her brother, Simeon, in Michigan.

She spent the winter of 1848 in Ottawa, Illinois teaching a class of a few young women, and preparing to open her school, an academy, in the spring of 1849. But in June 1849, with an outbreak of cholera in Ottawa, coupled with Mortimer's poor health forced her to leave Ottawa.

=== Milwaukee College ===
Catharine Beecher, then on an educational tour in the Western United States, became acquainted with Mortimer as a teacher, and met her in Ottawa. There, Beecher persuaded Mortimer to join the faculty of a private female seminary in Milwaukee founded in 1848, and conducted by Parsons. Mortimer joined the faculty in 1850, the school afterwards named Milwaukee College. Remarkable success was attained by the faculty of that school, among whom Mortimer was foremost, Mortimer conducting educational experiments in a format devised by Beecher and Beecher's sister, Harriet Beecher Stowe. Mortimer became the school's principal in 1853 and held that position until 1857.

In the summer of 1851, Mortimer spent her vacation in New York State with old friends. The month of May 1852, was spent by Beecher and Mortimer chiefly in New York City, in consultation with leading women of that city and vicinity. As a result of their activity, the American Woman's Educational Association was formed at this time.

In company with another friend, Mortimer purchased a modest house in Milwaukee on the corner of Milwaukee and Knapp streets which had been her home since the summer of 1853. Housekeeping was difficult for her, in addition to the overwhelming burdens of the school. In 1857, she left Milwaukee, Wisconsin, and removed to Elmira, New York, in charge of the Female Seminary. In Elmira, she formed a friendship with the Rev. Thomas K. Beecher, pastor of the Congregational Church. For the rest of her life, this served to be an important relationship to her.

=== Baraboo Female Seminary ===
No part of Mortimer's career gave her more pleasure than the years she spent in Baraboo, although in October 1859, Mortimer was crippled again in her right hand through overwork. From 1859 to 1863, she taught in the Baraboo Seminary, Wisconsin, there graduating three classes from a course identical with that of Milwaukee College. In Metaphysics, as in History, Mortimer was the chief teacher. In Mathematics, Mortimer often taught a class in geometry. In 1862, during the Civil War, irreparable financial problems occurred at the Baraboo Seminary. Mortimer's health had been such as to necessitate considerable absences from the school for recuperation. She left Baraboo in the summer of 1863, her own health requiring an extended period of rest.

In 1863, with occasional visits to friends in New York, Mortimer remained with her friend, Miss Huntington, in Boston, Massachusetts and vicinity for nearly two years after leaving her work at Baraboo. Most of this period was spent in Auburndale, Massachusetts, where, either in the seminary there, or in the home of Miss Huntington, Mortimer constantly had classes of young women under her instruction in advanced studies, without the care and labor attendant upon a permanent settlement for herself.

=== Return to Milwaukee College ===
Nine years had passed since Mortimer's retirement from active participation in the instruction and management of Milwaukee College, though she had made frequent visits to the school, and had sometimes accepted invitations to address the alumni and the pupils, or to attend and take part in its examinations. On June 13, 1866, the Board of Trustees ordered the execution of a lease with Mortimer, and the appearance of the Catalogue of 1866–7, with her name at the head of the faculty of instruction. Re-opened in September 1866, nothing new, either in principle or practice, characterized Mortimer's resumption of her old position at Milwaukee College. The aims and methods of education there from 1866 to 1874, were identical with those she had endeavored to carry out in the same institution from 1850 to 1857 and at Baraboo Seminary from 1859 to 1863; the course of study was essentially the same.

In January, 1871, Mortimer decided to realize the dream of her life by taking an extended vacation, including a return to England, and to see for herself the European civilization whose history and philosophy she had studied and taught. Of her plan of travel she said:— "I do not wish to be gone more than a year, nor to spend more than a thousand dollars. I have no wish to travel incessantly, nor to see everything. I wish to settle down in about four countries, England, France, Germany, and Italy, and live long enough to absorb something of the spirit of the people, and to look out upon life through their eyes."

Mortimer continued as principal of Milwaukee College until her resignation and retirement in 1874.

== Later life, death, and legacy ==
"Willow Glen", an estate in the northern suburb of Milwaukee, with cottage, trees, shrubbery, and river at its garden's foot, attracted Mortimer's attention and she purchased it in 1873.

During retirement, Mortimer co-founded the Woman's Club of Wisconsin, as well as the Wisconsin Industrial School for Girls.

On July 6, 1877, she became ill with a malignancy. Her only remaining sister, and by a brother from Michigan came and attended to her. Eventually, she became unconscious, and she died in Milwaukee, July 14, 1877. The Mary Mortimer Library in Milwaukee College, and her Memoir by Mrs. M. B. Norton are among the tributes of pupils to Mortimer. Mortimer Hall at The College at Brockport, State University of New York is named in her honor.
