= Ingham University =

Coordinates: 42.977°N 77.987°W

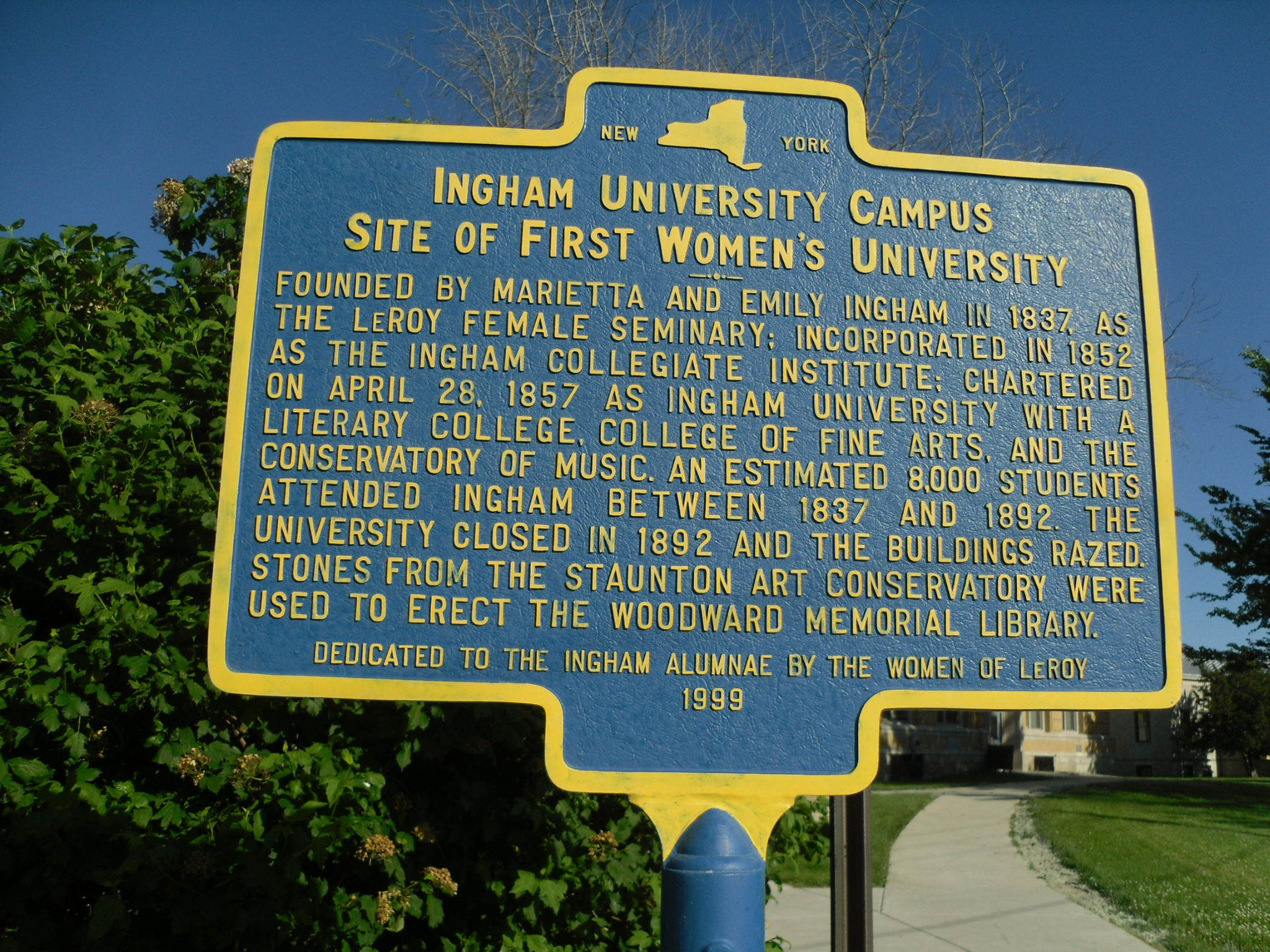
Plaque commemorating the Ingham University Campus.

Ingham University (previously known as Attica Female Seminary and LeRoy Female Institute) in Le Roy, New York, was the first women's college in New York State and the first chartered women's university in the United States. It was founded in 1835 as the Attica (NY) Female Seminary by Mariette and Emily E. Ingham, who moved the school to Le Roy in 1837. The school was chartered on April 6, 1852, as the Ingham Collegiate Institute, and a full university charter was granted in April 1857. After financial difficulties, the college closed in 1892 and its property was sold at auction in 1895. Over several years, the college's former buildings were demolished; the stone from the Arts Conservatory, the last campus building to be dismantled, was used to build the Woodward Memorial Library at the same location in Le Roy.

Ingham University was the alma mater of Sarah Frances Whiting, who later founded the physics department and established the astronomical observatory at Wellesley College.

== Notable people ==
- Nancy H. Adsit, author
- Ruth Webster Lathrop (1862–1940), physician
- Marion Juliet Mitchell, poet
- Mary Mortimer (1816–1877), British-born American educator
- Pauline Root (1859–1944), American physician, missionary
- Sarah Frances Whiting, physicist, astronomer
- Amelia Kempshall Wing (1837–1927), author and philanthropist

== See also ==
- List of defunct colleges and universities in New York
